= History of the Canton of Aargau =

History of the Swiss Canton of Aargau

Canton of Aargau flag and coat of arms

The History of the Canton of Aargau is dedicated to Aargau in Switzerland, founded in 1803, and its various preceding territories.

The area was settled over 150,000 years ago, with the Helvetii being the first historically recorded inhabitants. The Romans ruled for just over 400 years until the beginning of the 4th century. Augusta Raurica and the legionary camp of Vindonissa were particularly important during that period. The remaining Gallo-Roman population was gradually assimilated by immigrating Alemanni. During the latter half of the 8th century, the region was referred to as Aargau, which was a Gau in the Frankish Empire. Some of the current cantonal territory was once part of the Frickgau, the Sisgau, and the Zürichgau.

During the Middle Ages several noble families governed different areas in Aargau, such as the Lenzburgs, Kyburgs, and Zähringers. Among them, the Habsburgs became the most influential, eventually becoming one of the most powerful ruling dynasties in the Holy Roman Empire. While their base of power shifted to Austria towards the end of the 13th century, they lost their ancestral land of Aargau in 1415 when it was conquered by the Confederates.

The Confederates divided the territory among themselves. The largest part, the Bernese Aargau, was subject to the city of Bern, while smaller areas were given to the cities of Lucerne and Zurich. Two areas became common dominions under the joint administration of the places involved in the conquest: the County of Baden and the Freie Ämter. Only the Fricktal remained under Austrian control. The individual territories developed differently due to their ruling structures. The Reformation caused further division, being able to establish itself in Bernese Aargau and parts of the County of Baden.

The Canton of Aargau was created in 1798 as a result of the French invasion and the founding of the Helvetic Republic. At the time, it only comprised the western part. It was created at the same moment as the Canton of Baden and was followed by the Canton of Fricktal four years later. In 1803, Napoleon Bonaparte decreed the merger of the three cantons to form the Canton of Aargau. Despite its internal divisions, the new state became a pioneer of liberalism and triggered several developments that contributed to the founding of the modern federal state in 1848. Aargau, now the fourth largest canton in Switzerland by population, is primarily known as an energy and transit hub and struggles to assert its independence between the centres of Basel, Bern and Zurich.

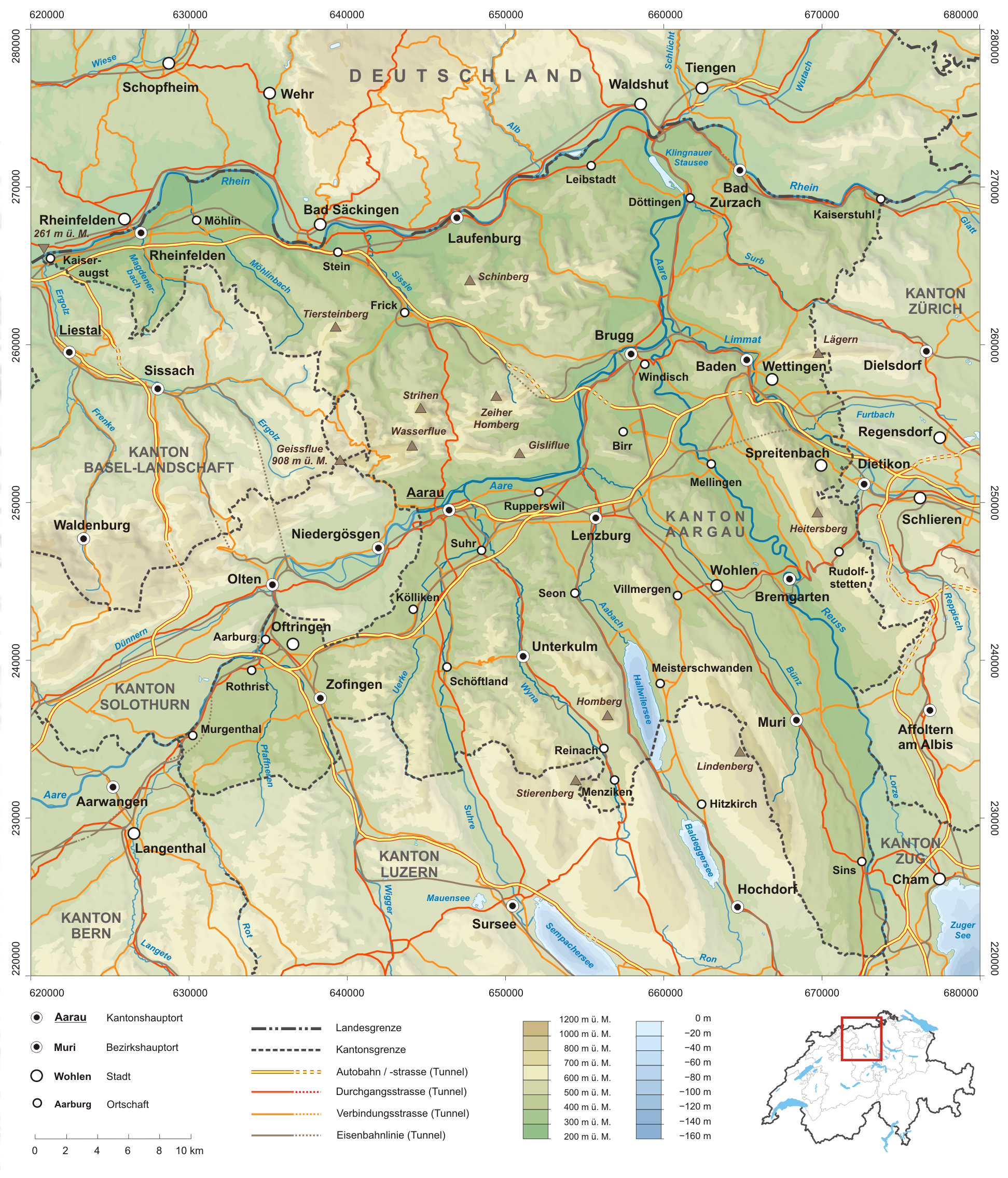
Map of the Canton Aargau

== Prehistoric period ==
=== Formation of the natural landscape ===
The canton of Aargau is divided by natural features. The northern part was shaped by the formation of the Jura Mountains, while the southern part on the Central Plateau was formed by glacial movements during the ice ages. The Riss Ice Age peaked approximately 140,000 years ago and covered most of the present-day canton, except for the western Fricktal valley around Rheinfelden and some Jura peaks that emerged from the ice.

The Würm Ice Age had a lasting impact on the landscape, although the glaciation was smaller than in other areas. Only the south-eastern part of the canton was covered by ice. The Reuss glacier and the Linth Glacier, which were at their largest around 20,000 years ago, left behind numerous erratic blocks that were displaced from the Alpine region to the plain. The previous range of these glaciers is still evident today in the terminal moraines located near Killwangen, Mellingen, Othmarsingen, Seon, Staffelbach, Würenlos and Zetzwil. The rocks left behind by the moraine at Seon created a dam that formed Lake Hallwil. At the end of the Ice Age, the lake was approximately twice its current size and gradually reduced to its present size over a few thousand years because of sedimentation. The glaciers in front of the valleys caused the rivers to deposit large amounts of gravel, creating significant aquifers.

=== Stone Age ===
The oldest archaeological findings in Canton Aargau have all been made in the western part of the Fricktal, which has always remained ice-free. A 150,000-year-old hand axe was found near Zeiningen, and a 50,000-year-old Neanderthal stone axe was discovered near Stein. During the final stages of the Würm Ice Age, approximately 10,000 years ago, reindeer and wild horses were hunted. A resting place near Magden was used multiple times. After the glaciers retreated, the moraine and gravel areas were gradually reclaimed by vegetation, resulting in the development of a moorland landscape. This was later replaced by extensive forests. People settled along the rivers, lakes, and high terraces of the large valleys, engaging in hunting, fishing, and gathering.

The earliest evidence of sedentary farmers in Aargau dates back to the period between 4500 and 4200 BCE, in the area around Wettingen and Würenlos. A burial ground with 16 stone cist graves on the Goffersberg near Lenzburg dates from around 3500 BCE. Additionally, several lakeside settlements were established on Lake Hallwil during this time. Further settlements were located near Untersiggenthal, Mönthal, and Suhr. Archaeologists discovered graves dating back to around 2400 BCE near Sarmenstorf and Spreitenbach, which are also of significant archaeological importance.

=== Bronze Age ===
There are few findings from the transitional period between the Neolithic and the Bronze Age (2400 to 1800 BCE) in Aargau. One of the few findings is a double grave discovered near Zurzach in 1986. Between 1600 and 1200 BCE, the population increased and people started to move to higher altitudes for better protection, instead of living only in the river valleys and on the shores of Lake Hallwil. A fortified hilltop settlement on the Wittnauer Horn near Wittnau, inhabited for several centuries until the Latène period, is the best-known site from this period. Another settlement was located on the Chestenberg.

=== Iron Age ===
The Iron Age started during the Hallstatt period around 750 BCE. Burial mounds, both large and small, from this period can be found mainly in Freiamt. The Reuss Valley served as a significant trade route from north to south during this time. The largest burial complex of this period discovered in Switzerland to date, consisting of no fewer than 63 burial mounds, is located near Unterlunkhofen. Other significant grave finds have been made in Reinach, Schupfart, Seon and Wohlen.

According to Roman sources, the Helvetii migrated from southern Germany and settled on the Central Plateau in the 1st century BCE. The larger Helvetian settlements were located in Mellingen and Baden. Julius Caesar mentioned twelve fortified towns (oppida) in his work De bello Gallico, but it is uncertain whether the settlement on the Windisch plateau was one of them. The Raurici, another Celtic people, lived in the Basel region and Fricktal.

Orgetorix led the Helvetii, who were frequently threatened by Germanic raids to the north, to abandon their settlements and move southwest to the lower reaches of the Garonne. However, in 58 BCE, Roman troops commanded by Julius Caesar stopped their advance at Bibracte. The Helvetii were forced to return, rebuild their villages and towns, and acknowledge Roman supremacy.

== Roman rule ==
Roman theatre in Augusta Raurica

A few years later, the Romans started colonising areas independently. Around 45 BC, they founded the town of Augusta Raurica (today Kaiseraugst) in the far north-west of today's canton of Aargau to secure an important transport route to Gaul. Initially, the settlement was concentrated west of the Violenbach stream in the canton of Basel-Landschaft and expanded onto Aargau soil around a hundred years later.

Settlement in the area came to a standstill for around three decades after Caesar's assassination in 44 BC and the subsequent civil war. In about 15 BC, the Romans constructed a small military station on a plateau near the confluence of the Aare, Reuss, and Limmat rivers to secure the Augustan Alpine campaigns. This station was later expanded into the legionary camp of Vindonissa (now Windisch) in 14 CE. Additionally, two significant Roman roads intersected at this location. To supply the camp, farmsteads (villa rustica) were scattered throughout Aargau. The largest known ones were located near Möhlin, Oberentfelden, and Zofingen (see Villa rustica (Zofingen)).

There were also three vici (village settlements): Aquae Helveticae (now Baden), a few kilometres east of Vindonissa on the Limmat, dates from around the time the camp was founded. It was known far and wide for its hot springs and thermal baths, but was also an important settlement for craftsmen. Tenedo (now Bad Zurzach) was a roadside village on the Rhine, settled from the second quarter of the 1st century and used as a bridgehead for an important river crossing. The vicus Lindfeld near Lenzburg (name unknown at the time, probably Lentia) existed from the second quarter of the 1st century. A theatre with 4000 seats formed the centre of a religious complex.

The Legio XIII Gemina was stationed in the Vindonissa camp until 44, when it was replaced by the Legio XXI Rapax. In 69, the year of the Four Emperors, the Helvetian militia stationed in Tenedo supported Emperor Galba and ambushed a courier detachment. The legionaries that were allied with Vitellius carried out a punitive action under Caecina's command. They devastated and plundered estates and settlements in a wide radius around Vindonissa. Following his ascension to power, Vespasian ordered the transfer of the 21st legion to Lower Germania and the stationing of Legio XI Claudia in Vindonissa.

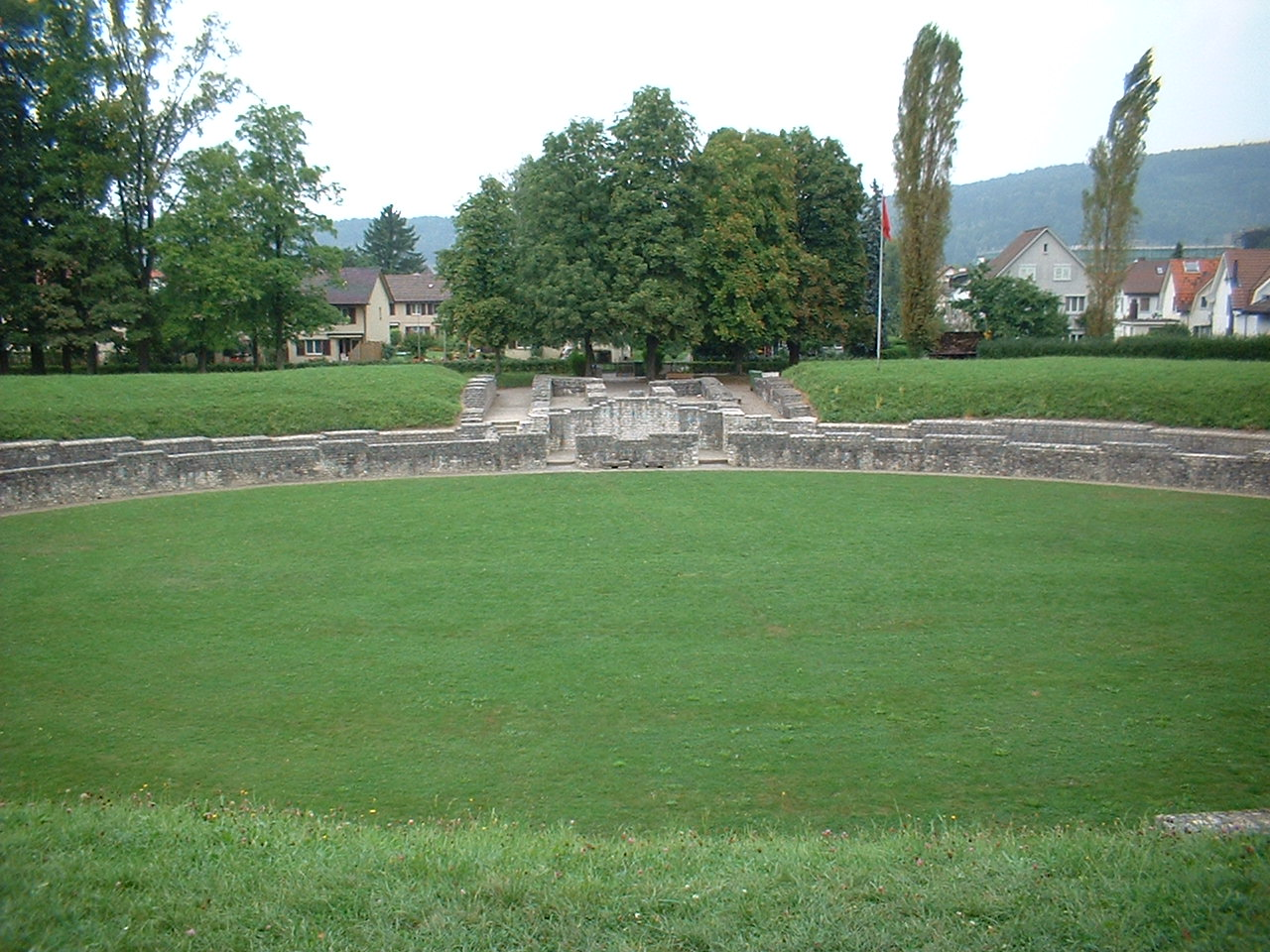
Amphitheatre in Vindonissa

In 101 the military departed the camp, leaving behind a guard post of Legio VIII Augusta. Vindonissa was transformed into a civilian settlement, which included an amphitheatre with seating for 11,000 people. The second century was a relatively peaceful and uneventful period. Trade flourished, with raw materials and luxury goods imported from Italy, southern France and Spain in particular. Producers in Aargau exported a variety of foodstuffs, including grain, meat, honey and cheese, to Italy. Artisans were also plentiful. There were potteries and blacksmiths in Baden, Kaiseraugst, Windisch and Lenzburg, brickworks in Hunzenschwil, Kaisten and Kölliken and quarries in Mägenwil and Würenlos.

This period of prolonged peace came to an end in the 3rd century with the invasion of the Alemanni. Attempts to repel the Alemanni's initial incursions in 213 and 233 were initially successful. However, in 259, the Alemanni finally breached the Upper Germanic-Rhaetian Limes and advanced through the Central Plateau, plundering and destroying. The Roman troops were compelled to retreat across the Alps and did not regain control of the area south of the Rhine until 277, which was now the northern border of the Roman Empire. The Battle of Vindonissa, in which the Romans were victorious over the Alemanni, is recorded for the year 298. In response to the threat posed by the Alemanni, numerous forts and watchtowers were constructed to defend the border. The Vindonissa legionary camp was also reoccupied. During the 4th century, the Alemanni repeatedly launched raids. To reinforce the border defences on the Rhine, the Romans extended them for the last time between 369 and 371. Between 401 and 406, the Romans withdrew across the Alps for good. The population, which had been depleted by the ravages of war, was forced to seek refuge in the fortified towns, where they became impoverished and the infrastructure fell into disrepair.

== Early Middle Ages ==
=== Settlement by the Alemanni ===
Almost a century after the Romans departed, the Alemanni commenced the process of settlement in the Aargau region. Initially, they aspired to relocate to western France, but in 497, following a military defeat, they were compelled to acknowledge the authority of the Franks and turn their attention to the south. Between 507 and 536, the southern portion of Aargau was under the control of the Ostrogoths until they were also expulsed by the Franks. By the middle of the 7th century, the Frankish dynasty of the Merovingians had lost considerable influence, and the Alemanni had established an independent duchy. In 746, the Alemanni were finally subjugated by the Carolingians, and the duchy was dissolved.

The endings of place names from the present day indicate approximately when the individual villages were founded. Villages with the ending "ach" (e.g. Mandach, Rüfenach, Zurzach) are of pre-Germanic origin and are derived from the Gallo-Roman word ending "acum". The Alemannic endings indicate three phases of settlement: in the 6th century, places with the ending "ingen" emerged. These settlements were typically named after the head of the family. Villmaringen (now Villmergen) is an example of this, meaning "by the people of Villmar." From the late 6th to the 8th century, places with the endings "ikon" or "iken" emerged. These are shortened forms of "inghofen" and denote a farm. Dottikon, therefore, means "by the farms of the men of Toto." Villages with the ending "wil" or "schwil" (e.g. Dättwil, Waltenschwil) emerged after the 8th century. This ending denotes a hamlet. Other endings such as "büren", "dorf", "heim", "stetten" or "hausen" appeared around the turn of the millennium.

Apart from numerous graves with grave goods, there are few archaeological traces, as the Alemanni constructed all their houses out of wood. However, their economic and social system characterised the lives of the inhabitants of the Aargau until well into the 19th century. Over time, their language developed into Swiss German.

=== Aar-Gau ===
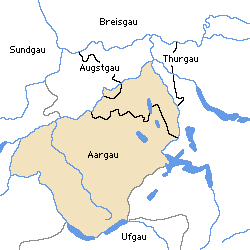
Aargau in the 8th century

For administrative purposes, the Carolingians divided the empire into gaue, which were ruled by counts. The name Aar-Gau first appeared in 768 as "pagus Aregaua" and in 778 as "pagus Aragougensis". Aargau encompassed the area between the rivers Aare, Reuss, Mount Pilatus, Lake Brienz and Lake Thun. The territory only encompassed approximately half of the area that the canton occupies today.

In the Wasserschloss of Switzerland, located to the north of Windisch, three districts of the Frankish Empire met. Crossing the Aare marked the transition into the Augstgau. The Reuss formed the border with Thurgau, a fact reflected in the name of the municipality of Turgi, which still serves as a reminder of this border demarcation today. After the division of the empire in 843, the border between the Middle Kingdom and the Eastern Kingdom ran along the Aare. Following the dissolution of the Middle Kingdom in 870, the entire canton was incorporated into the Eastern Kingdom. Around 900, the Burgundians conquered Aargau.

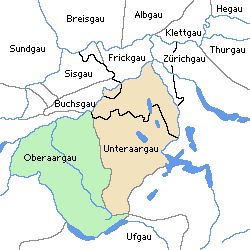
Aargau in the 10th century

In the 10th century, the district was reduced in size and divided into Unteraargau and Oberaargau. The north-western part of today's canton was in the Frickgau and partly in the Sisgau, while the part east of the Reuss was in the Zürichgau. In 1033, the entire territory of Switzerland fell to the Holy Roman Empire. It was not until the 14th century that the term Aargau began to be used to describe the remaining areas.

=== Christianisation ===
Christianity only spread very slowly in Aargau during Roman times. The first religious communities can only be traced back to the early 4th century. Saint Verena, who came from Thebes (Egypt), moved to what was then the Roman fort of Tenedo (Zurzach), where she healed the sick and supported the poor until her death in 344. Zurzach then developed into a place of pilgrimage. In 346, Augusta Raurica was named as the seat of a bishop (the seat of the diocese was subsequently moved to Basel in the 7th century). Vindonissa had also been the seat of a bishop in the 6th century, but was then replaced by the diocese of Constance. Initially, Christianity was only able to gain a foothold in the old Gallo-Roman fort centres, while the Alemannic immigrants remained largely pagan. Only the most elite members of the Alemanni initially permitted themselves to be Christianised, following the example of the Merovingians. The Christian faith only finally became established at the end of the 7th century.

== High Middle Ages ==
=== Nobility in Aargau ===
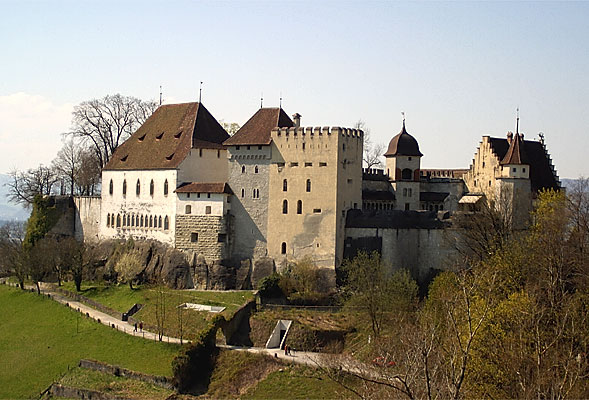
Lenzburg Castle

It is challenging to ascertain the precise age of the earliest castles. The history of Alt-Homberg Castle in Fricktal can be traced back to at least the 10th century. Lenzburg Castle, the largest and most significant castle complex in Aargau, was constructed in the early 11th century and first mentioned in a document in 1036. It was the ancestral seat of the Counts of Lenzburg, who exercised authority over the Seetal valley. A second centre of power was located around Baden with Stein Castle.

The Lenzburg family dynasty was extinguished in 1173. Emperor Frederick Barbarossa personally resolved the succession issue at Lenzburg Castle and bestowed the majority of the lands upon his son, Count palatine Otto of Burgundy. However, following his death in 1200, the Kyburgs were able to reclaim their right to succession and oust the Hohenstaufen family from Aargau. Following the extinction of the Zähringers in 1218, the Kyburgs became the most powerful noble family in Aargau. However, they too eventually died out in 1264.

Other significant noble families with extensive land in Aargau included the Counts of Frohburg, the Barons of Regensberg and the Barons of Klingen. Additionally, there were numerous minor local noble families, of which the Hallwyls were the most prominent.

=== Germ cell of the Habsburg Empire ===
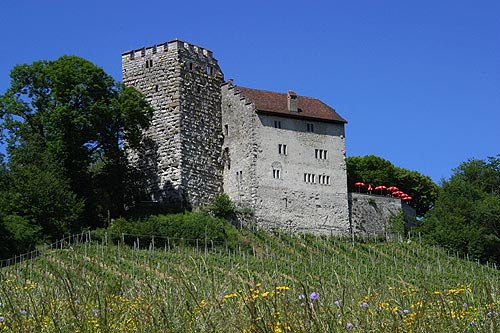
Habsburg Castle

The Kyburgs' principal rivals for dominance in the Alpine foothills were the Counts (later Dukes) of Habsburg. It is probable that they descended from a branch of the Etichonids in Alsace, and that they were able to acquire extensive territories there, as well as in Breisgau and Frickgau. In the 10th century, they settled in Altenburg near Brugg, and made the Eigenamt the centre of their activities. In the vicinity of Altenburg, Radbot constructed the "Habichtsburg" (subsequently known as Habsburg) in approximately 1020, establishing it as his new family seat. In 1108, Otto II, Radbot's grandson, was the first documented individual to be referred to as "von Habsburg".

The Habsburgs were able to gain control of the inheritance of other noble families by building skilful connections through marriage. This enabled them to expand their possessions. In 1223, they took over the inheritance of the Old-Hombergs and thus gained control of the strategically important Bözberg Pass. In 1232, the Habsburg-Laufenburg collateral line split off. However, the Laufenburgs only owned relatively insignificant territories around Laufenburg and in Obwalden. This line became impoverished and died out in 1386 with the sale of the last possessions to the main family line.

During the reign of Rudolf I, the Habsburgs ascended to become a significant European power. The Kyburgs, who had inherited the Zähringen and Lenzburg dynasties, ceased to exist in 1264. The Habsburgs assumed control of their legacy and supplanted them as the preeminent territorial power in northern Switzerland. Following Rudolf's election as German king in 1273, the Habsburgs' influence shifted to Austria. Nevertheless, they continued to expand their holdings in their native lands. In 1291, the Alsatian prince-abbey of Murbach sold its sovereign rights over several villages in Aargau, the monastery of St Leodegar in Lucerne and numerous villages in central Switzerland for 2000 marks of silver.

The Confederates began to apply increasing pressure on the Habsburgs in their homelands. The Habsburg expansionist policy received its first setback in 1315 following the loss of the Battle of Morgarten. In 1351, troops from Zurich marched through the Ostaargau. They devastated Baden and Siggenthal and destroyed Freudenau Castle, the conflict culminating in the Battle of Dättwil. In 1375, the Gugler raided the Mittelland, inflicting relatively minor damage on Aargau in comparison to its western neighbours. However, the town of Lenzburg was razed to the ground for tactical reasons and rebuilt shortly afterwards. The defeat at the Battle of Sempach on 9 July 1386 severely weakened the Aargau nobility. In addition to Duke Leopold III, around 400 nobles allied to him were felled. The resulting power vacuum made it increasingly evident that the influence of the Habsburgs was shifting towards the east.

=== Founding of towns and monasteries ===
Around 1100 there was not a single town in Aargau. But this was followed by a wave of town foundations that reached its peak between 1230 and 1240, when no fewer than six towns were founded. The initiative came from nobles who wanted to strengthen their domain and create new sources of income.

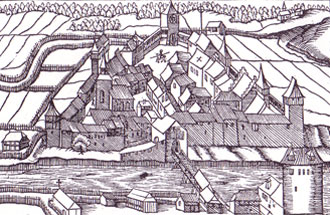
Kaiserstuhl in the year 1548

The first town in Aargau was Rheinfelden, which was founded between 1130 and 1140 by the Zähringen dynasty. In the early 13th century, the Counts of Frohburg followed with the foundation of Zofingen. The first Habsburg towns were Brugg (after 1200) and Laufenburg (before 1207). Four Kyburg towns were founded within ten years: The towns of Baden and Mellingen were founded around 1230, while Aarau and Lenzburg were established around 1240. The Habsburg town of Bremgarten was also founded during this period, as was Klingnau. The exact date of foundation is only known for Klingnau: this town was founded on 26 December 1239 by the barons of Klingen. The Habsburg towns of Meienberg (after 1250) and Aarburg (after 1300), and Kaiserstuhl (approximately 1254), the only town founded by the Regensberg on Aargau territory, were the last to follow.

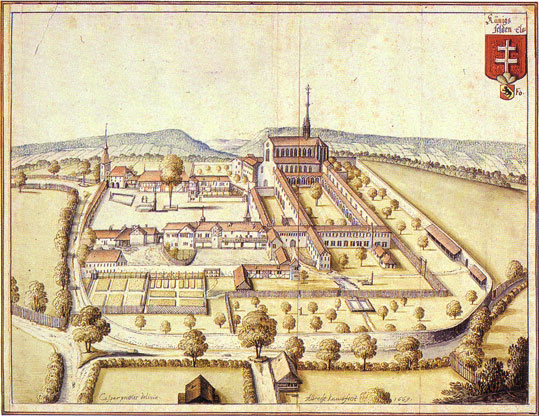
Königsfelden Monastery in 1669

Some places failed to develop further. The most notable example is Zurzach, which had an urban structure and, thanks to the Zurzach trade fair, was an important economic centre beyond the region. However, it was not granted a town charter as there were already three towns in the immediate vicinity that were under the control of the Bishop of Constance (Klingnau, Tiengen, Waldshut). Although Biberstein was fortified with a ring wall in 1399, it lacked both a market and town rights and was reduced to a village. Meienberg was destroyed by the Confederates after the Battle of Sempach in 1386 and has remained a small farming village to this day. Kaiserstuhl has only grown marginally since its foundation. No Aargau town has succeeded in building up a larger territory of its own. The reasons for this are threefold. Firstly, the foundation occurred relatively late in the history of the region. Secondly, the town was granted only limited rights. Thirdly, excessive power held by sovereigns.

In addition to nobles and cities, various monasteries also exercised secular power. For centuries, these were also centres of art and knowledge. Between the 11th and 14th centuries, thirteen monasteries and three canonries were founded on Aargau soil. The most significant abbeys were Muri (1027, Benedictines), Wettingen (1227, Cistercians) and Königsfelden (1309, Franciscans). Monasteries situated outside of the Aargau region also exerted considerable influence, in particular Saint Blaise and Säckingen, as well as the diocese of Constance. Additionally, the Order of Saint John (Biberstein, Leuggern, Rheinfelden) and the Teutonic Knights (Beuggen, Hitzkirch) possessed considerable landed estates.

== Conquest of the Aargau ==
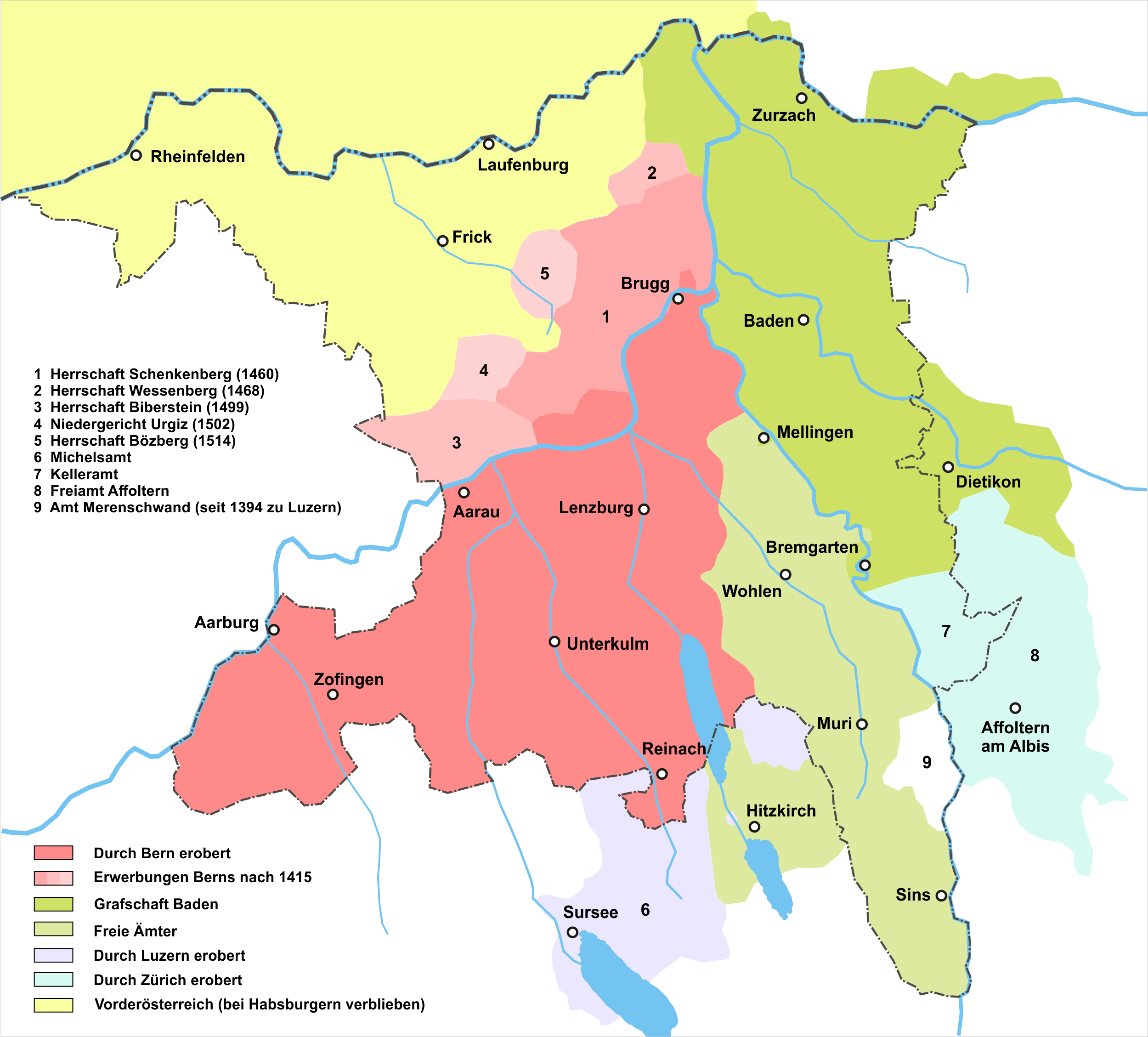
Territorial division of the Aargau after the conquest by the Confederates

The underlying conflict between the German King Sigmund and the Austrian Duke Frederick IV reached a critical point at the Council of Constance in 1415. Frederick assisted one of the three popes at the time, John XXIII, in fleeing the city. Sigmund perceived this as an opportunity to inflict harm upon his adversary, calling upon the Habsburgs' neighbours to seize their lands in the name of the empire.

The Confederates were tasked with occupying Aargau at that time, despite having signed a peace treaty with Austria just three years prior. Bern demonstrated the least hesitation, immediately marching troops out. Zurich and the towns in central Switzerland initially hesitated due to the peace treaty, but ultimately set off to avoid leaving everything to the Bernese. Only Uri did not participate in the campaign.

On 18 April Zofingen was captured by the Bernese. Six days later, Aarau, Brugg, Lenzburg and Habsburg were also conquered, with minimal resistance. Lucerne besieged Sursee and subdued the Michelsamt and the offices of Meienberg and Richensee. Zurich occupied the Freiamt Affoltern and the Kelleramt. Following the capitulation of Mellingen, the Zurich troops joined forces with those of Lucerne, Glarus, Schwyz, Unterwalden and Zug. Together, they compelled the inhabitants of Bremgarten to surrender on 24 April. The inhabitants of the Villmergen area also voluntarily allied themselves with Lucerne.

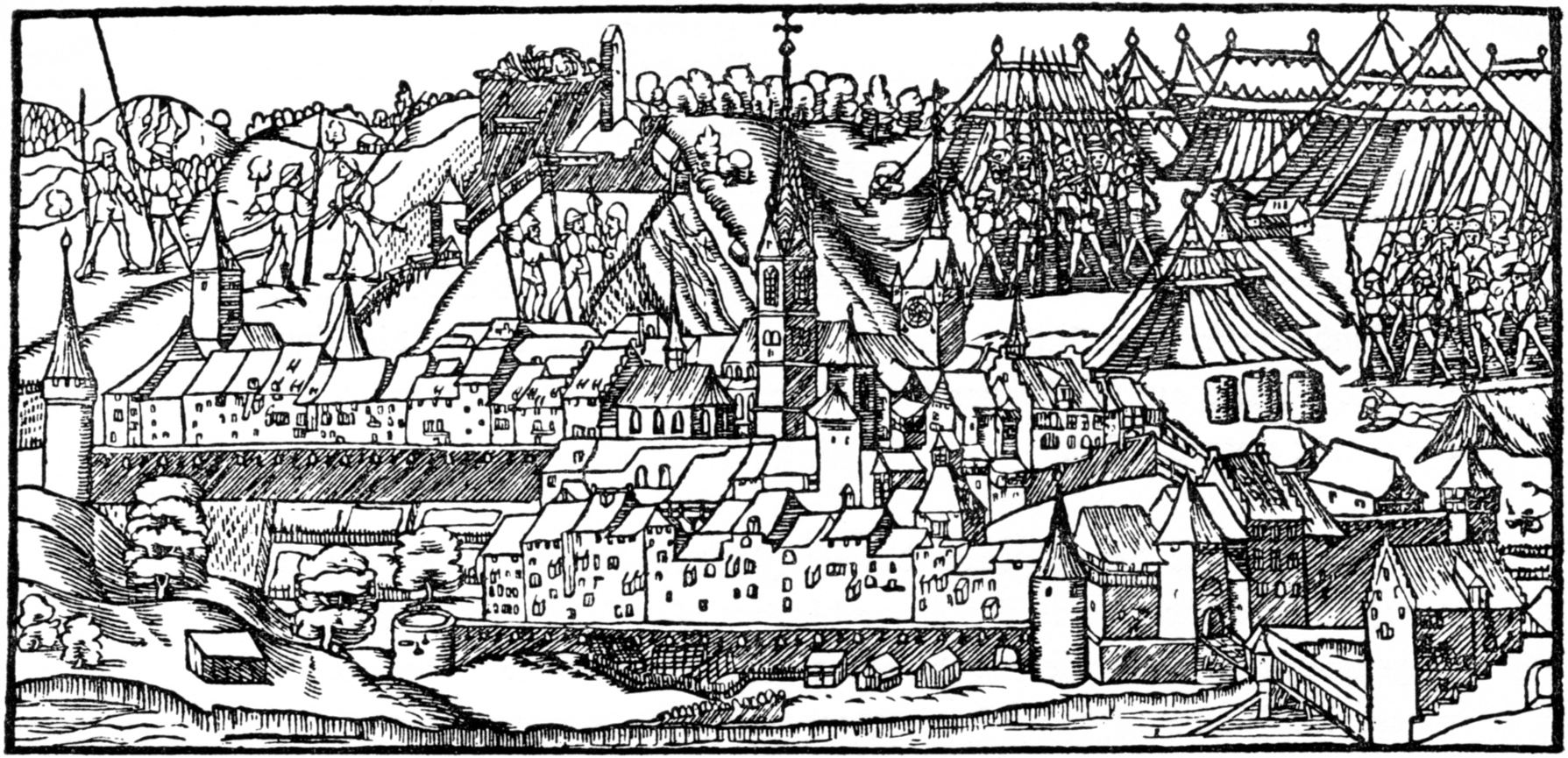
The Siege of Baden, woodcut from the Stumpf Chronicle (1548)

The siege of Baden commenced on 25 April, during which the troops of the Austrian bailiff Burkart von Mansberg mounted a resistance. The defenders evacuated the town on 3 May and retreated to Stein Castle. On 9 May, the Bernese, who were already on their way back, were requested to assist in a siege on the castle. On 11 May, von Mansberg signed a truce. Following the surrender of the defenders on 18 May, the castle was immediately razed to the ground.

During the campaign Duke Frederick reconciled with King Sigmund, who demanded an immediate cessation of hostilities and the return of the territories that had been conquered. Only the Confederates did not comply. By acquiring the lien over the Bailiwick of Baden and the towns of Baden, Mellingen, Bremgarten and Sursee on 22 July, Zurich was able to find a formal legal solution to this problem. On 18 December 1415, Zurich incorporated the five towns of Lucerne, Schwyz, Unterwalden, Zug and Glarus into the pledge. This was followed by the incorporation of Bern on 1 May 1418. The Habsburg house archives, which had been located in Stein Castle, were transferred to Lucerne and only returned to the Habsburgs in 1474. In the same year, the Habsburgs finally renounced all territorial claims with the "Perpetual Accord".

With the conquest of the Aargau, the Confederates assumed de facto sovereignty. As they had not reached an agreement before the campaign, they disagreed for more than ten years on the division of the conquered territories. Bern finally prevailed and was permitted to retain all the territories it had conquered in Unteraargau (the so-called Bernese Aargau). Zurich was awarded the Kelleramt and the Freiamt Affoltern, while Lucerne was granted the Michelsamt. Nevertheless, Lucerne was obliged to return the offices of Richensee and Meienberg, as well as the area around Villmergen, to the common property in 1425.

The Confederates established two common dominions, the Freie Ämter and the County of Baden, from the common property, a strip of territory averaging 15 kilometres in width. The initial impact of the conquest on the inhabitants of the Aargau was minimal. The Confederates merely assumed the sovereign rights that had previously belonged to the Habsburgs. In some villages, the change in authority only affected the higher jurisdiction, while the lower jurisdiction was initially retained by the towns, local nobles, or monasteries.

== Development in the individual dominions ==
=== Unteraargau ===
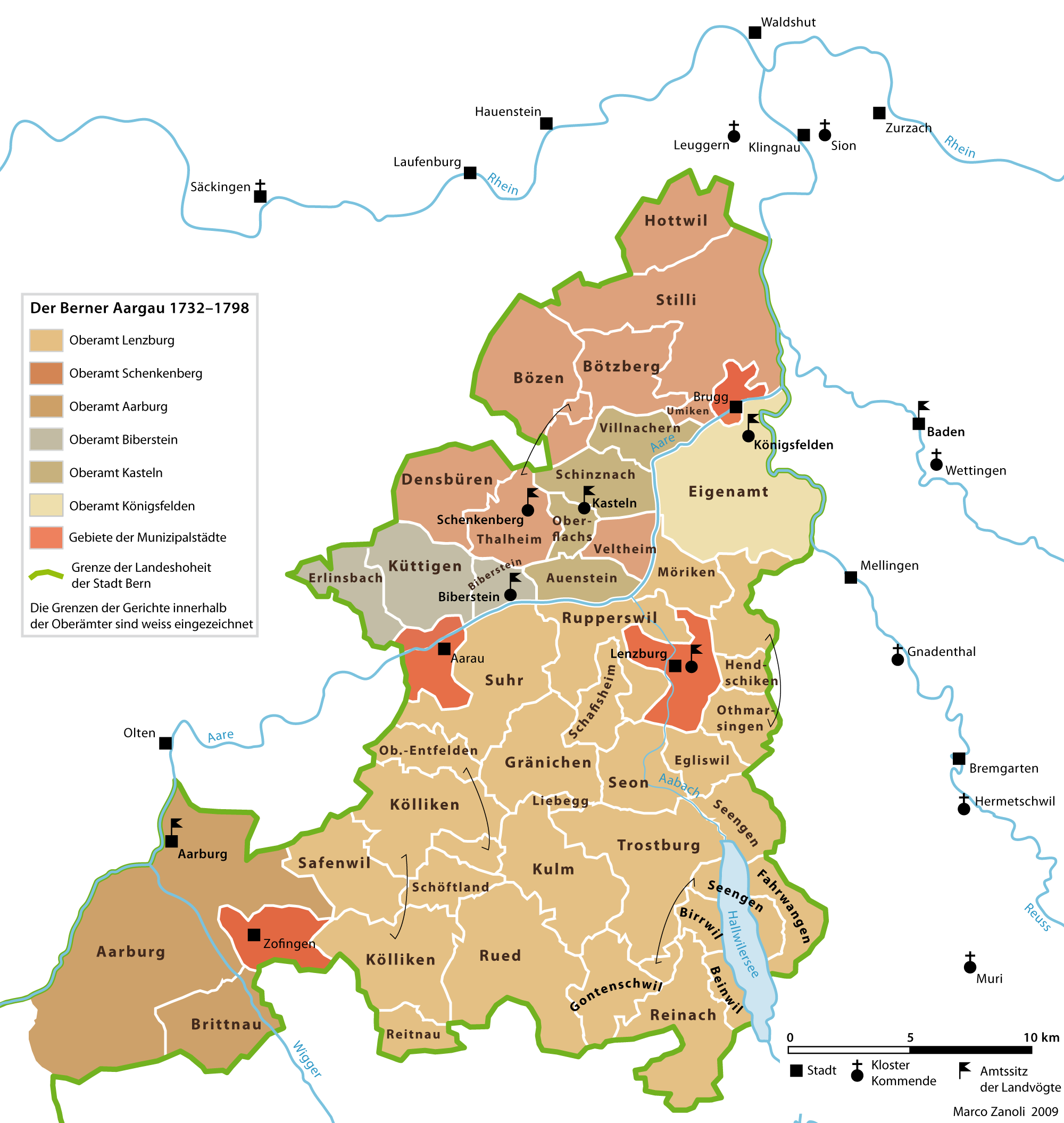
Chief offices in Bernese Aargau 1732–1798

The territorial situation in Bernese Aargau underwent a fundamental transformation. The Bernese succeeded in acquiring new territories in the Jura and securing the Bözberg and Staffelegg passes. In 1460, they conquered the lordship of Schenkenberg, and during the Waldshut War in 1468, they gained the lordship of Wessenberg, which included the villages of Hottwil and Mandach. In 1499, the lordship of Biberstein was occupied during the Swabian War. In 1502, the lower court of Urgiz with the village of Densbüren was purchased. The expansionist policies of the Bernese reached their conclusion with the purchase of the lordship of Bötzberg (comprising Bözen, Effingen and Elfingen) in 1514.

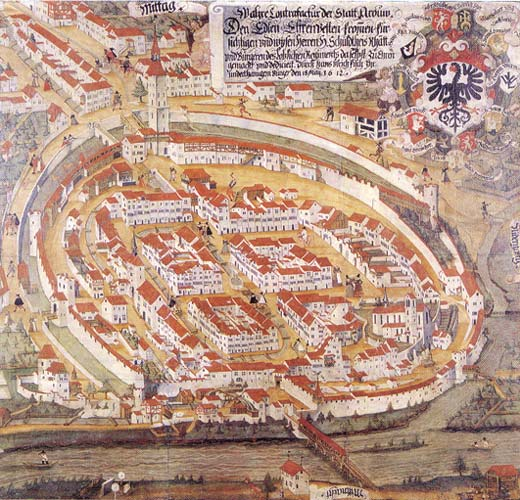
Aarau in the year 1612

Over more than three centuries, the Bernese succeeded in almost completely buying up or usurping the manorial rights of local rulers. By the 18th century, the influence of the nobility had fallen to a minimum. Bernese Aargau gradually developed into a state with a modern character. Initially, the region was administered by a single bailiff from Aarburg. Subsequently, the bailiwicks of Lenzburg (1442), Schenkenberg (1460), Biberstein (1499), Königsfelden (1528) and Kasteln (1732) were incorporated. The four "municipal towns" of Aarau, Brugg, Lenzburg and Zofingen were granted the right of self-administration and their own jurisdiction. The tight administration facilitated economic development, with Bernese Aargau becoming the most industrialised region in Switzerland by the beginning of the 18th century.

The Old Zurich War also had an impact on Bernese Aargau. On 30 July 1444, Brugg was plundered and burned down by Habsburg nobles in the so-called "Brugg Night of Murder". In February 1499, during the Swabian War, an Austrian army marauded through the Schenkenberg district. They were supported by peasants from the Mettauertal. In response, the Bernese, in conjunction with the inhabitants of Fribourg, devastated the settlements situated to the north of the Staffelegg, extending as far as Frick.

=== Freie Ämter ===
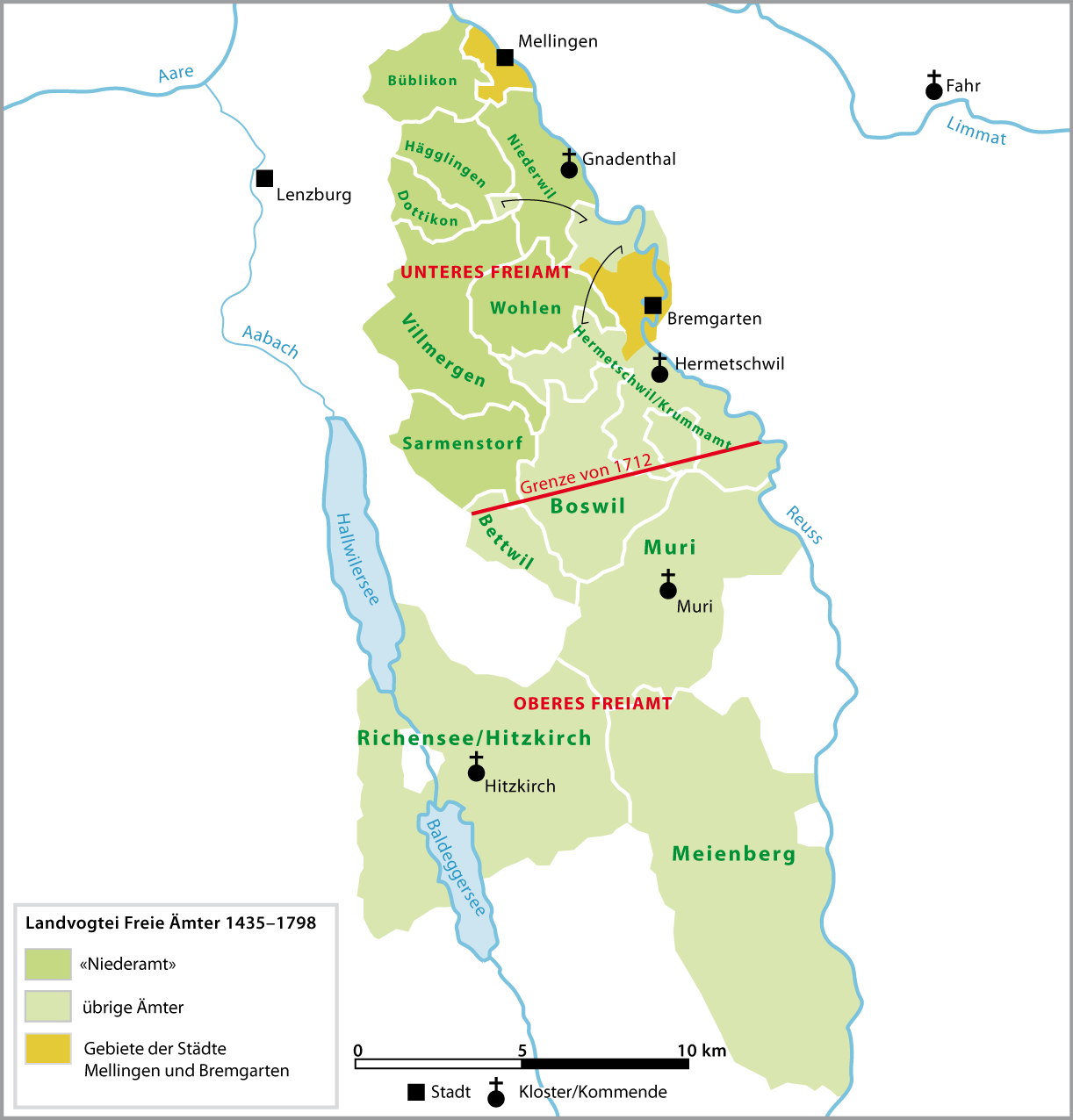
The Bailiwick of the Freie Ämter 1435–1798

The Freie Ämter constituted a common lordship and comprised the former Habsburg administrative districts of Meienberg, Muri and Richensee, as well as the north-eastern part of the district of Lenzburg. The six ruling places of Glarus, Lucerne, Schwyz, Unterwalden, Zug and Zurich alternated in occupying the influential office of bailiff for two years. The bailiff did not have a fixed residence; rather, they only appeared three times a year to deal with serious court cases and collect taxes. From 1532 (one year after the victory of the Catholic towns in the Second Kappel War), Uri also appointed bailiffs. The Kelleramt south-east of Bremgarten was conquered by Zurich, which, however, only took over the high jurisdiction, while the lower jurisdiction remained in the possession of the town of Bremgarten.

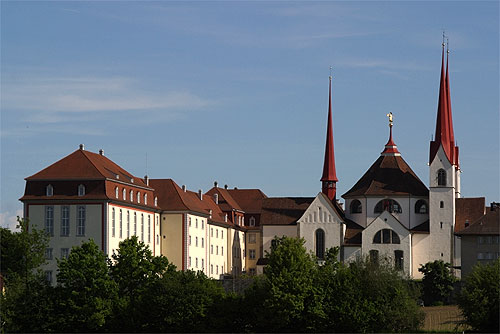
Muri Abbey

The jurisdictions within the court system and the lordships were highly fragmented. The most significant landowner, the largest economic factor, and the holder of the lowest jurisdiction in the majority of locations was Muri Abbey. This Benedictine abbey was regarded as the richest monastery in Switzerland at the end of the 17th century. Other lords of courts and landlords included Hermetschwil Abbey, the towns of Bremgarten, Mellingen, Lucerne and Zug, as well as individual local nobles. Merenschwand had been under the jurisdiction of Lucerne since 1394 and was not part of the Freie Ämter.

As the rulers changed every two years, the administration was less developed than in Bernese Aargau, for example, and the subjects could permit themselves more than elsewhere and were rarely called up for military service. The ruling places were mostly only interested in tax revenues and otherwise cared little about the area. From 1562, a land registrar residing in Bremgarten took care of the few administrative tasks. However, the loose control also had its disadvantages: Freiamt served as a gathering place for beggars and vagrants from across the Confederation. The economy remained underdeveloped due to a lack of investment security. The pivotal battle of the Swiss Peasant War occurred in Wohlenschwil, in the far northwest of the Freie Ämter, on 3 June 1653. Here, the rebellious peasants from the Bernese and Lucerne subject territories were defeated by the troops from Zurich.

=== County of Baden ===
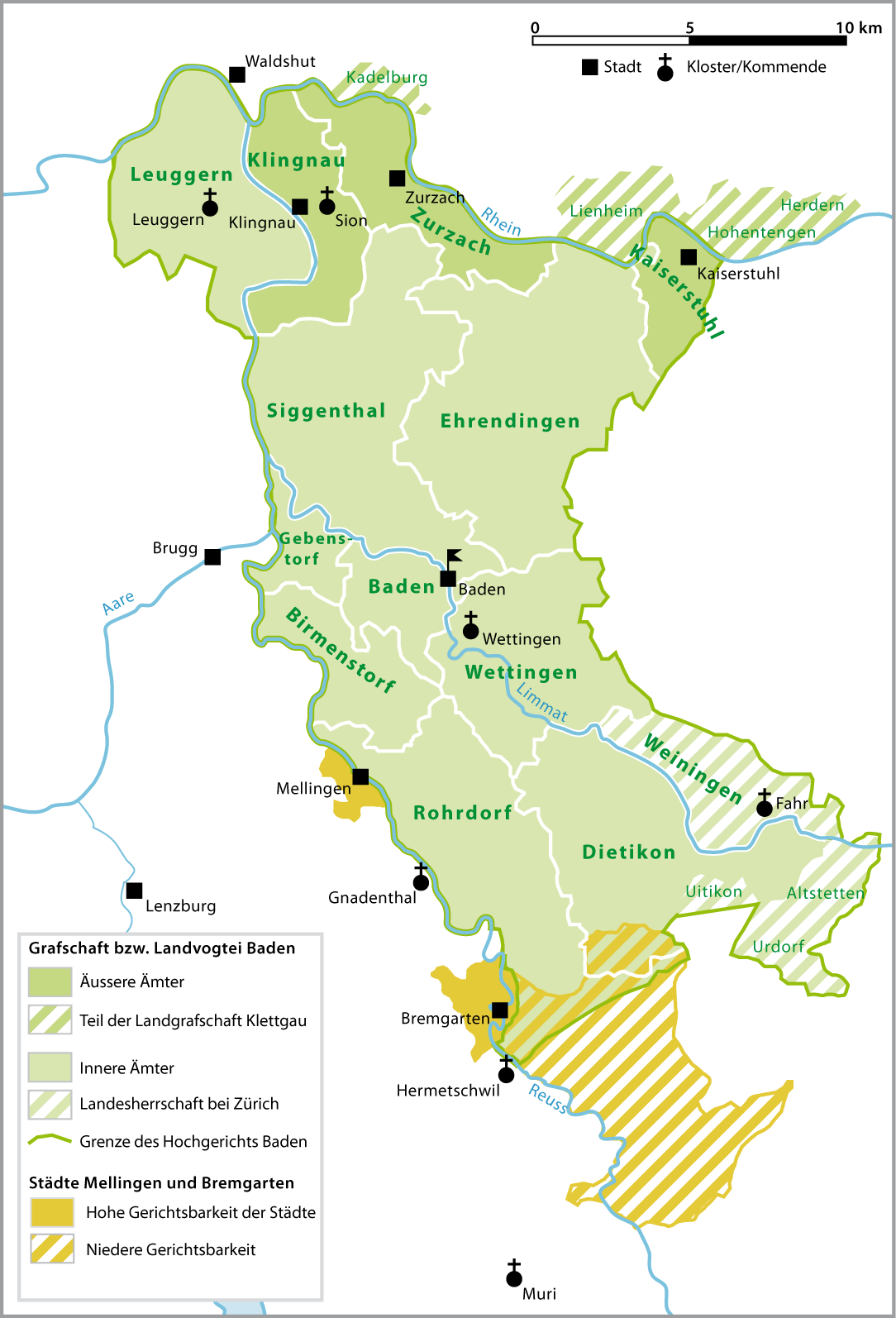
The Bailiwick of Baden 1415–1798

The County of Baden was a common lordship that was administered by all seven places that had been involved in the campaign of 1415. From 1443, Uri was also included in the administration. Each village provided a bailiff for two years, who resided in the Baden bailiff's castle. It was only in individual villages that the bailiff exercised the financially lucrative lower jurisdiction, which meant that the County of Baden was initially a loss-making business for the Confederation. The Wettingen and Saint Blaise monasteries, the In commendam of the Knight Hospitaller in Leuggern and the Bishopric of Constance were important courts and landlords. The towns of Baden, Bremgarten and Mellingen were largely autonomous and only belonged to the County of Baden for administrative purposes.

Over the centuries the Confederate bailiffs were able to gradually usurp the rights of the secular and ecclesiastical lords. However, developments occurred more rapidly in the villages of the eastern Limmat Valley, where Zurich was able to exercise almost unrestricted powers, provided the lords of the court and recruited troops. Today, all of these municipalities belong to the canton of Zurich, and Altstetten is even a district of Zurich.

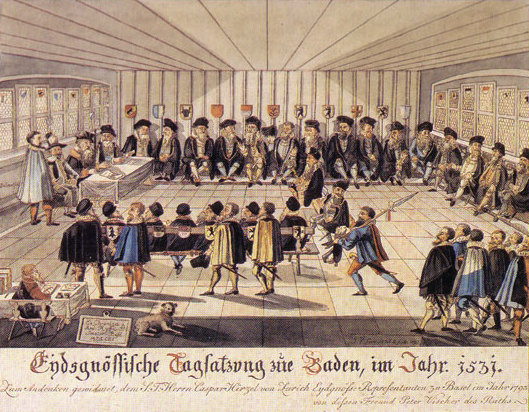
Diet in Baden in the year 1531

The administration of the territories that had been jointly conquered required more frequent consultations between the individual parts. To this end, the delegates met from 1415 onwards for Tagsatzungen, which took place in Baden's town hall. Although other towns also organised conventions, Baden was particularly popular due to its baths and the associated diversions. The most significant matters of the entire Confederation were exclusively negotiated in Baden, including the approval of the annual accounts of all the common lordships from 1426 onward, as well as decisions on war and peace.

The proximity of the region to Zurich also led to its involvement in the Old Zurich War. In 1444, Baden, Mellingen and Bremgarten allied themselves with Zurich and opposed the Confederation. As a result, the Confederates besieged these three towns and recaptured them. During the Swabian War, the villages in the parish of Leuggern (located in the northwest of the county) were plundered and partially burnt down.

=== Fricktal ===
The Fricktal was not conquered by the Confederates in 1415 and remained in the possession of the Habsburgs as part of Further Austria. The bailiff of Further Austria initially resided in Ensisheim in southern Alsace. Following the conquest of Alsace by France in 1651, the Fricktal was governed from Freiburg im Breisgau. Unlike today, the Rhine did not form a political border. The Fricktal valley was divided into two administrative units, the Kameralherrschaft Rheinfelden and the Kameralherrschaft Laufenburg, which were part of the Oberamt Breisgau from 1752. The area was not uniformly structured, with numerous villages directly under the Austrian administration and others where the nobility and clergy exercised individual rights of rule, particularly in lower jurisdiction. The Säckingen convent was the most important landowner and the greatest economic power in the region.

In comparison to the other regions, the Fricktal was significantly more affected by armed conflicts. During the Old Zurich War, Bern, Basel and Solothurn unsuccessfully besieged the town of Laufenburg. In 1445, Rheinfelden allied itself with Basel but was compelled to submit to Austrian rule once more in 1449 following a siege that lasted several months. In 1469, the Habsburgs pledged the Fricktal to Burgundy to raise funds for reparations following the Waldshut War. Following the Burgundian Wars, which was disastrous for the Burgundians, the Habsburgs reestablished control in 1477.

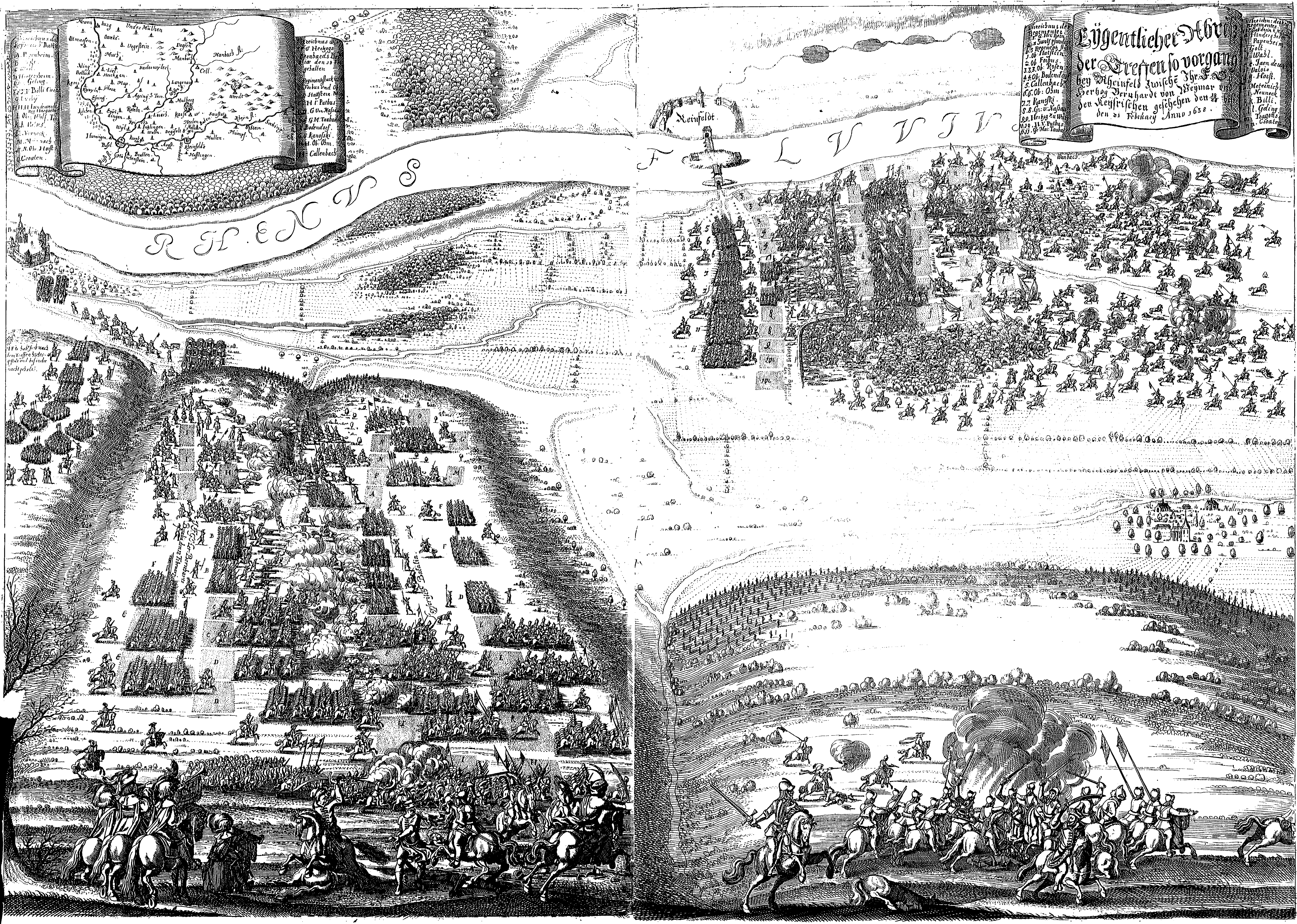
Battle of Rheinfelden, copperplate engraving by Matthäus Merian

During the Swabian War of 1499, peasants from the Mettau Valley plundered the neighbouring villages in Bernese Aargau with the acquiescence of Austria. In response, the villages north of the Staffelegg were devastated by the Bernese and Fribourgs. In the Rappenkrieg (1612 to 1614), the Fricktal farmers unsuccessfully defended themselves against a tax increase. Between 1633 and 1638, the Fricktal was one of the few areas of present-day Switzerland to be directly affected by the Thirty Years' War. Swedish, French and Austrian troops marched through the region. The Battle of Rheinfelden took place in 1638, resulting in a victory for the reformed side. Ultimately, more than a third of all houses in the Fricktal were destroyed, and the impoverished population required decades to overcome the consequences of the wars.

During the Nine Years' War, French troops advanced through the Fricktal until they were halted by the Confederates. In 1689, the government of Further Austria was compelled to seek refuge in Klingnau for approximately one and a half years. During the War of the Spanish Succession, the War of the Austrian Succession and the Seven Years' War, the Fricktal was not directly involved in hostilities. However, the population was subjected to high war taxes, which had a significant impact on economic life. The Josephine reforms of Austrian Emperor Joseph II brought about a gradual improvement in living conditions.

== Confessional division ==
=== Reformation turmoil ===
Following the establishment of the Reformation in Zurich in 1523, Huldrych Zwingli and his like-minded colleagues began disseminating the new doctrine in the County of Baden. Initially, this occurred in those villages in the Limmat Valley that were under Zurich control and thus largely removed from the influence of the bailiff. Additionally, individual priests also began disseminating the ideas of the Reformation in the area around Aarau and the Freie Ämter.

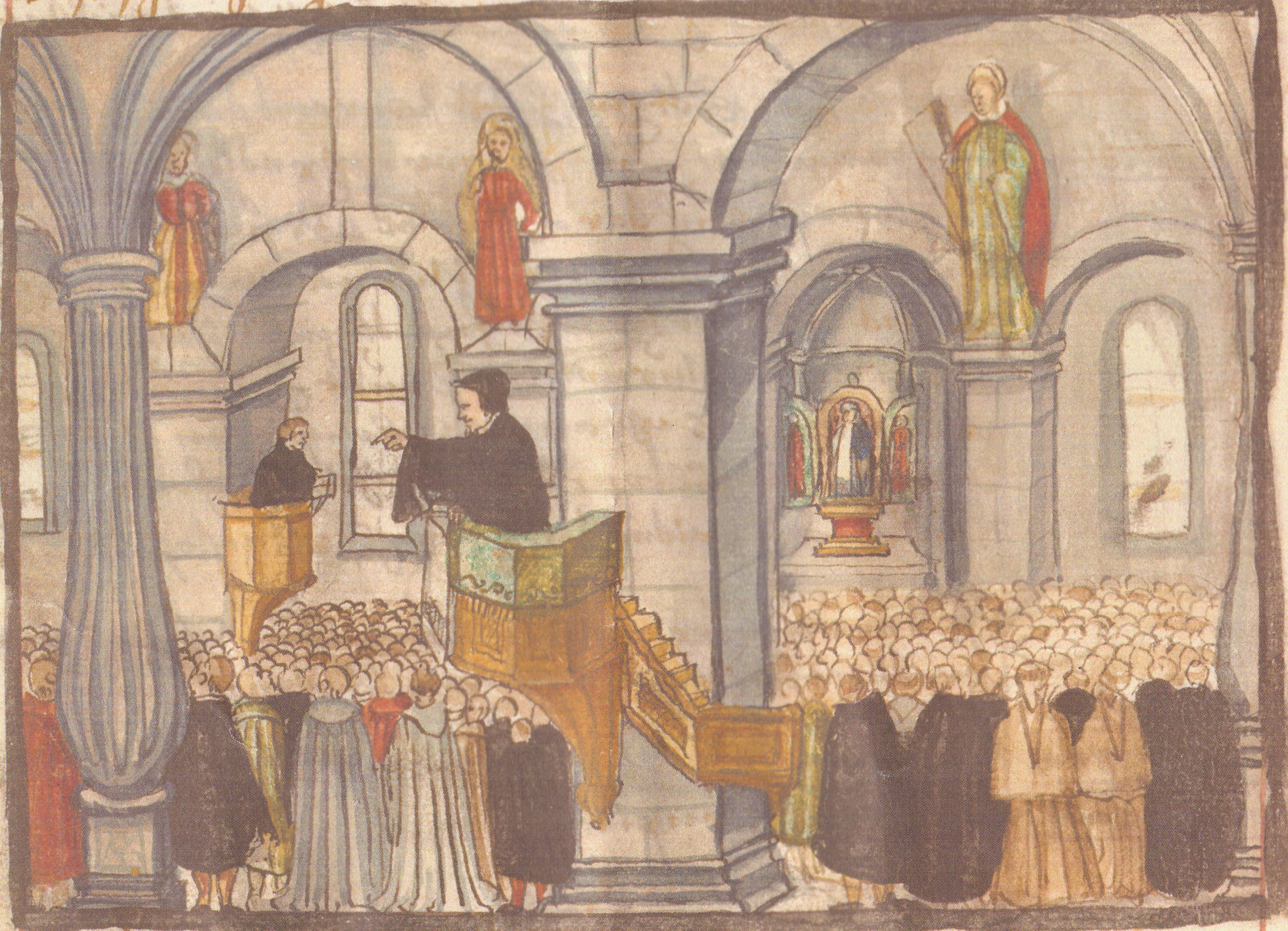
Baden Disputation

In 1524, the central Swiss cantons of Lucerne, Schwyz, Unterwalden, Uri and Zug resolved to maintain Catholicism and sought to assert this claim in the common dominions. To this end, they convened the Baden Disputation in 1526. The German theologian Johann Eck succeeded in persuading the clergy from Baden and the surrounding area to adhere to the traditional faith, whereas Johannes Oecolampadius was unable to gain support for the Reformation. However, the Reformation attracted more and more adherents, particularly in the Zurzach region and in the lower Freiamt area around Wohlen and Bremgarten.

Bern initially adopted a neutral stance and remained undecided, particularly given that the majority of the subject territories expressed support for the old faith in an official survey. However, under pressure from the guilds, the Small Council of Bern decided to organise a religious debate. At the Bern Disputation in January 1528, the supporters of the Reformation prevailed, leading the Small Council to consistently introduce the new denomination in all Bernese subject territories, including Unteraargau. Bern proceeded to abolish all monasteries and confiscate the estates of ecclesiastical lords. This measure proved particularly beneficial to the towns, as the monasteries had previously constituted a significant economic competitor.

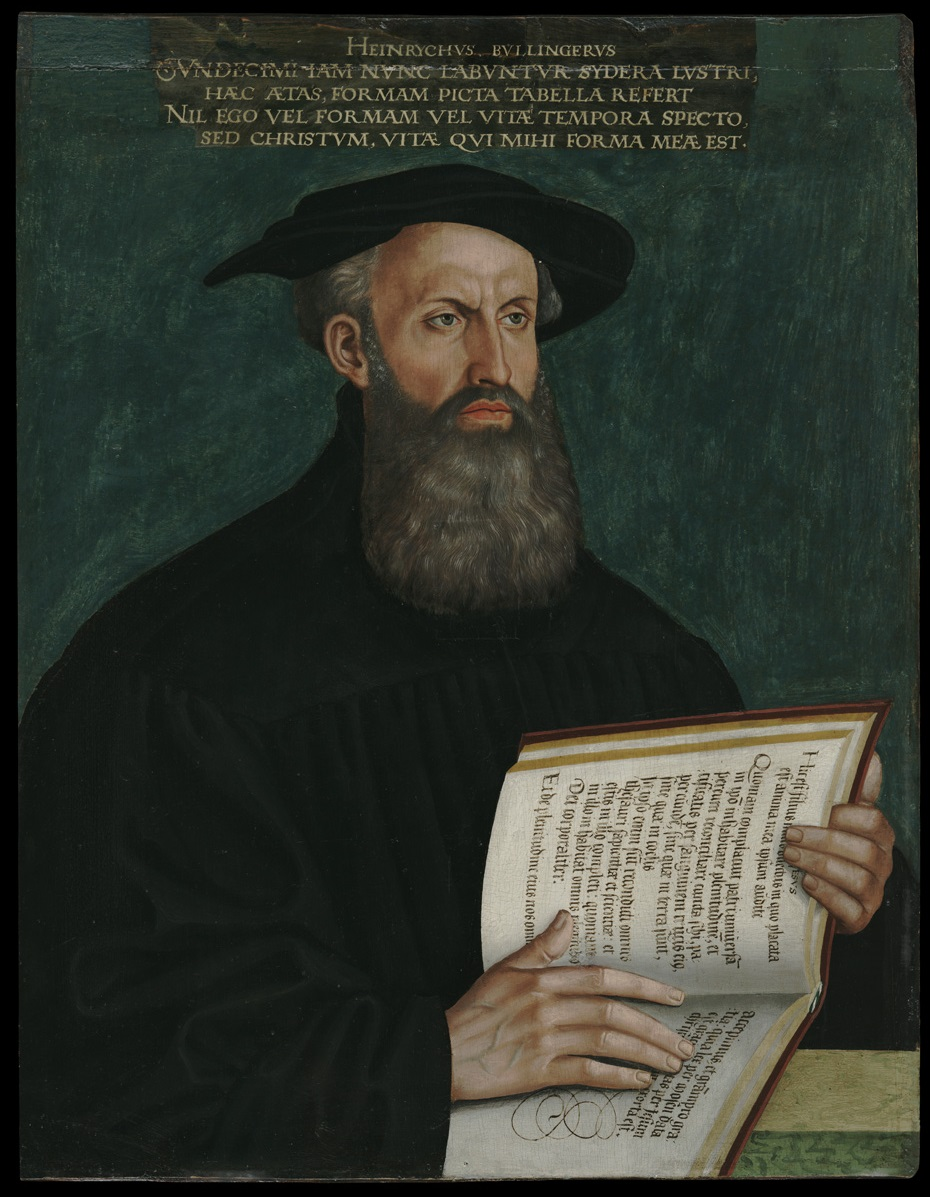
Heinrich Bullinger

A narrow strip of Catholic territory remained between Bern and Zurich, but half of the parishes had already converted to the new denomination. Finally, in June 1529, the First War of Kappel broke out, but largely without hostilities. In the First Peace of the Land, the Reformed villages ensured that each parish was free to choose its own faith. However, following the Second War of Kappel in 1531, which resulted in a Catholic victory, the previous conditions were reinstated under the Second Land Peace. The County of Baden and the Free Offices were re-Catholicised, on occasion through the use of force. Only in Zurzach and Tegerfelden was a Reformed majority maintained, as well as in the communities of the eastern Limmat Valley. The villages of Gebenstorf, Birmenstorf and Würenlos remained confessionally mixed. Heinrich Bullinger, the parish priest of Bremgarten, was obliged to flee to Zurich and succeeded the deceased Ulrich Zwingli.

The Fricktal, which was under Austrian rule, remained largely unaffected by these events. Over time, small reformed minorities in Rheinfelden and Laufenburg were re-Catholicised or emigrated to Basel.

=== Internal contrasts and conflicts ===
Following the turbulence of the Reformation, the differences between the various regions of Aargau became increasingly pronounced. In the Catholic areas, the grievances that had ultimately led to the Reformation were only gradually resolved after the Council of Trent in 1563. This was followed by a religious revival, which manifested in the construction of magnificent Baroque church buildings and the increase in pilgrimages. Muri Abbey developed into a centre of Baroque art. Between 1588 and 1650, four Capuchin monasteries (Baden, Bremgarten, Laufenburg, Rheinfelden) and one for Capuchin nuns (Baden) were also constructed in Aargau. The other monasteries also experienced an upswing, and in 1701 Muri Abbey was granted the status of a prince abbey.

For over a century people in Aargau followed two different calendars. The Reformed towns refused to use the Gregorian calendar introduced by Pope Gregory XIII in 1582. This resulted in a lack of mutual respect for public holidays, which repeatedly led to serious tensions. It was not until 1701 that the difference of ten days was equalised when the reformed places also adopted the improved calendar. Over time, the number of public holidays on which no work was allowed increased. The resulting lower productivity in the Catholic areas led to economic decline. The fragmentation of political responsibilities meant that nobody in the common lordships took action to improve the situation. Only in the Fricktal did the Habsburgs attempt to counteract this by introducing a state church. During the reigns of Maria Theresa and Joseph II, numerous public holidays were abolished and pilgrimages lasting several days were banned. Nevertheless, as the controls were relatively lenient, the inhabitants of the Fricktal continued to observe their traditional customs in private.

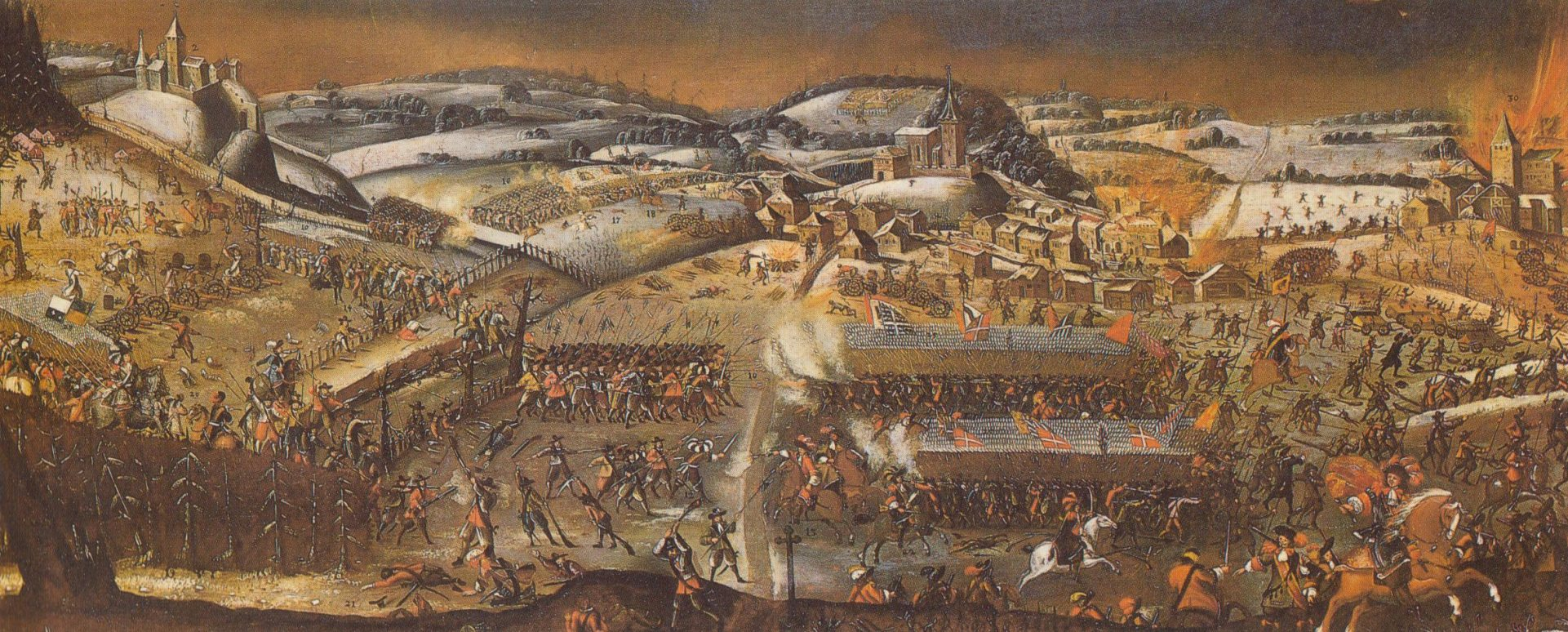
First battle of Villmergen

The long-standing tensions within the confessional divide reached a boiling point in 1656 with the outbreak of the First War of Villmergen. Following the expulsion, handing over to the Inquisition, or execution of numerous reformed individuals by the authorities of the state of Schwyz, Zurich declared war on the Catholic towns. However, the campaign was poorly organised, with the allied Bernese troops being defeated by the central Swiss in the First Battle of Villmergen on 24 January. The peace treaty, which was concluded on 7 March, reaffirmed the conditions that had existed since 1531. In Baden, Stein Castle, which had been destroyed in 1415, was rebuilt as a fortress.

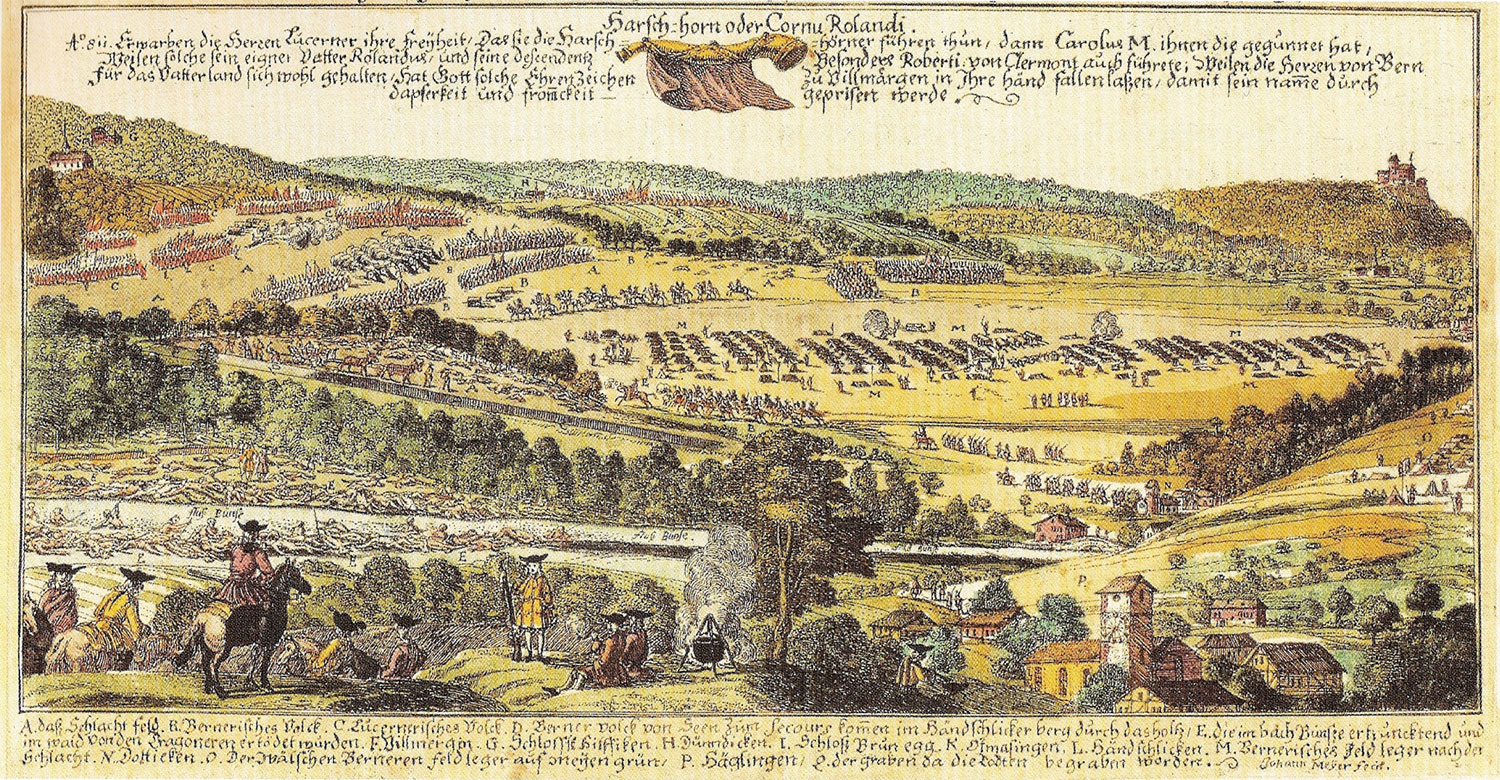
Second Battle of Villmergen

The conflict resumed in 1712 when the reformist inhabitants of Toggenburg revolted against the Prince-Abbot of Saint Gallen. The Second War of Villmergen initially took place mainly in eastern Switzerland but then moved westwards. In May, the Bernese occupied Mellingen, and Zurich occupied Bremgarten. In the "Battle of the Stauden", which took place near Fischbach-Göslikon on 26 May, the Bernese troops managed to extricate themselves from an ambush laid by the Central Swiss. Four days later, they besieged Baden in conjunction with the Zurich troops, attacked the fortress of Stein and succeeded in destroying it. Finally, on 25 July, the decisive Second Battle of Villmergen took place. The conflict concluded with a decisive defeat for the Central Swiss forces at the hands of the Bernese.

The power dynamics within the common lordships underwent a profound transformation. The Freie Ämter were divided into two distinct halves, with a clear and straight demarcation line extending from the church in Oberlunkhofen to the gallows in Fahrwangen. This line also delineated the village of Boswil into two unequal segments. In the upper districts, the Catholic villages were still permitted to participate in the political process, but in the lower districts, only the Reformed villages of Bern, Zurich and Glarus exercised authority in a ratio of 7:7:2. In the county of Baden, the Catholic villages were now entirely excluded from the political sphere; here, Bern, Zurich and Glarus ruled in the same ratio. The Reformed Church of Baden was established in 1714 from the ruins of the demolished fortress of Stein, which had a profound impact on the Catholic inhabitants of Baden.

After 1712 Baden's significance as a venue for diplomatic conferences declined significantly. Only a few Tagsatzungen were held, as the Catholics refused to engage in discussions about the administration of the common dominions at the place of their defeat. In contrast, the peace congress organised by Emperor Charles VI and King Louis XIV of France in "neutral" Baden in 1714 attracted diplomats from across Europe to the spa town. This resulted in the Peace of Baden, signed on 7 September 1714 by Prince Eugene of Savoy and Claude Louis Hector de Villars. Together with the peace treaties of Utrecht and Rastatt, this treaty brought an end to the War of the Spanish Succession.

=== Situation of the Jews ===
In the Middle Ages, Jews lived in many Swiss towns. However, they were not allowed to practise a trade or own land, so they were only allowed to trade and lend money. When the ban on interest for Christians was lifted, the Jews became a troublesome competition. They were expelled from the towns and settled mainly in the common lordships, where they were directly subordinate to the bailiff. From 1696, they had to buy an expensive letter of protection every 16 years. From 1776, all Jews in Switzerland were only allowed to live in the Surbtal communities of Endingen and Lengnau in the north of the county of Baden. As they were only allowed to stay in the two villages at night, their radius of action was severely restricted, leaving them practically only the Zurzach fair as a source of income.

== Revolution and upheaval ==
=== Forerunners of the revolt ===
In the second half of the 18th century the inhabitants of Aargau began to become more tolerant of followers of other denominations. At least the Bernese Aargau and the Austrian Fricktal were gradually transforming into a modern state. While cotton processing spread in Bernese Aargau (particularly through the establishment of Indienne printing works), straw plaiting emerged in the Freie Ämter.

The ideas of the Enlightenment found fertile ground in Bernese Aargau, particularly from 1761 onwards, when representatives of the intellectual and economic elite of the Confederation met in Schinznach-Bad to exchange ideas. This led to the establishment of the Helvetic Society the following year. Furthermore, the number of schools and libraries in the Reformed regions continued to grow. As the education system in Catholic areas was essentially non-existent, except for monasteries, Catholics reacted with suspicion and even hostility to the new ideas. Those espousing modern thought were perceived as being opposed to religion.

From 1789 only a minority of wealthy merchants and educated city dwellers sympathised with the ideas of the French Revolution. As more and more French refugees reported atrocities from 1791 onwards, the level of rejection of the Revolution grew, especially among the Catholic rural population.

=== Helvetic Republic ===
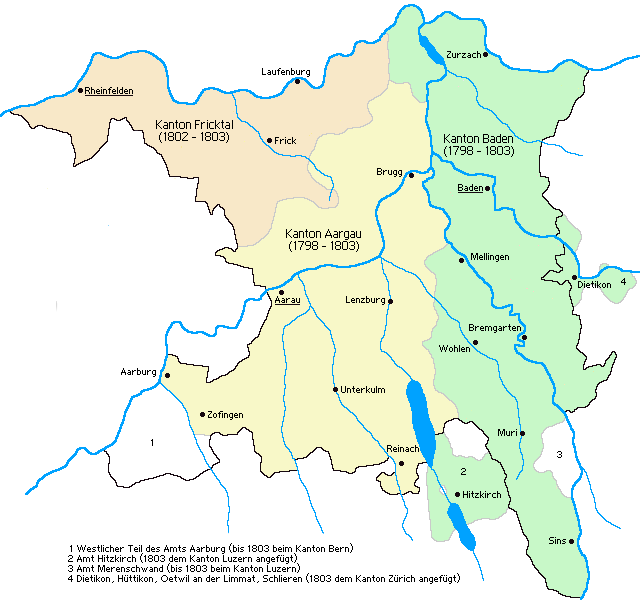
Aargau during the Helvetic Republic 1798–1803

In the early months of 1798, French troops initiated an invasion of Switzerland (French invasion). On 30 January, the inhabitants of Aarau declined to provide troops to protect the city of Bern. Despite Bern's occupation of the renegade city on 4 February, it was compelled to surrender on 5 March following the Battle of Grauholz. Between 19 and 28 March, the bailiffs withdrew from the common lordships. In numerous villages and towns, freedom trees were erected, and revolutionary celebrations were organised.

On 12 April 1798 Peter Ochs officially proclaimed the Helvetic Republic in Aarau. Due to the pro-revolutionary attitude of the townspeople, Aarau was declared the capital. The former Bernese Aargau became the Canton of Aargau, while the County of Baden and the Freie Ämter became the Canton of Baden. The western part of the district of Aarburg remained with Bern. In the centralised republic, the cantons were merely administrative units. It soon became apparent that Aarau was too small to fully fulfil the functions of a capital city, so the government transferred to Lucerne on 20 September. On 26 April 1798, supporters of the old order from Zug and the Free Offices were defeated by French troops in the battle of Hägglingen.

A considerable number of individuals from Aargau played a pivotal role in the new state. These included Philipp Albert Stapfer, Albrecht Rengger, Johann Rudolf Dolder, Johannes Herzog, Johann Heinrich Rothpletz and Heinrich Zschokke from Magdeburg. The Fricktal had already become a French protectorate in 1797 following the Treaty of Campo Formio. The physician Sebastian Fahrländer from Ettenheim in the district of Ortenau assumed the role of governor with the support of the French and facilitated the establishment of the canton of Fricktal, which joined the Helvetic Republic on 13 August 1802.

In 1799 Aargau became a theatre of war in the War of the Second Coalition between France and Austria. The inhabitants were compelled to billet and feed the troops on both sides, resulting in significant material hardship. On 16 and 17 August, 40,000 Austrian soldiers attempted unsuccessfully to cross the Aare at Döttingen. In the subsequent artillery engagement, the villages of Kleindöttingen and Eien (now part of the municipality of Böttstein) were destroyed.

During this time, there were attempts at establishing a definitive border for the Aargau, but the criteria used by the proposals greatly differed. The fact that there were no fewer than three different proposals for the demarcation of the cantonal borders before they were finalised shows just how randomly they were drawn:

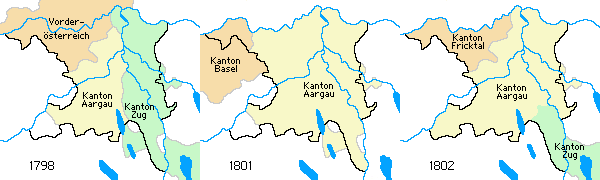
Proposed divisions of the Canton Aargau.

The initial constitution of the Helvetic Republic, drafted by Peter Ochs in January 1798, initially proposed the incorporation of the County of Baden and the Freiamt into the Canton of Zug. However, this was rejected by the French and also failed due to strong opposition from Zug itself. Following two coups d'état in 1800, the Malmaison Constitution, drawn up by First Consul Napoleon Bonaparte, provided for the cantons of Aargau and Baden to be merged and the lower Fricktal to be ceded to the canton of Basel. In the summer of 1801, activists attempted to collect signatures in favour of the reunification of Bernese Aargau with Bern but were prevented from doing so by Aargau government troops. Following a third coup d'état on 27 October 1801, those in favour of the status quo revoked the merger of the two cantons.

The second constitution of the Helvetic Republic of 1802, which was drawn up following another change of power, stipulated that the cantons of Aargau and Baden were to be reunited. Zug was to receive the upper Freiamt, while Lucerne was to gain the Amt Hitzkirch. The Fricktal was to remain an independent canton. However, the implementation of this constitution was thwarted by Napoleon's decision to withdraw French troops from Switzerland in July 1802, a move that was motivated by his frustration with the perceived ineptitude of the Helvetic authorities.

Immediately a civil war-like atmosphere of unrest emerged, with opponents of the revolution launching attacks against the supporters of the French. During the Stecklikrieg in September, an ever-increasing number of impoverished country folk marched from Aargau to Bern, engaging in plunder and forcing the Helvetic government to flee to Lausanne. On 21 September, hatred was unleashed against the Jews, who were perceived as supporters of the new order. In the "Plum War", a large group of approximately 800 men invaded the towns of Endingen and Lengnau, seizing the belongings of the local population, who were unable to defend themselves.

=== Napoleon's decisive authority ===
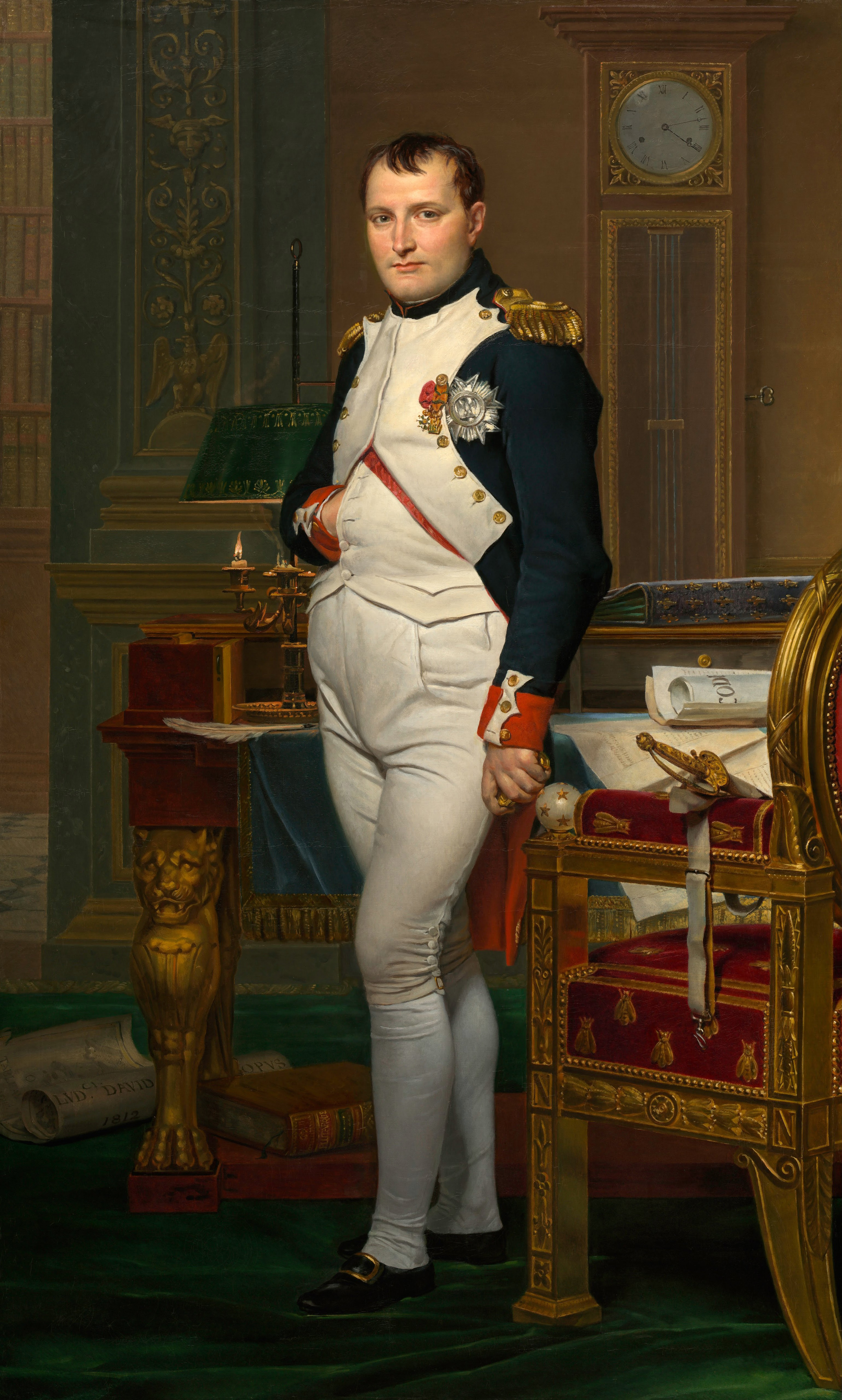
Napoleon Bonaparte set the final border.

On 30 September 1802 the Helvetic state crisis reached its zenith. Napoleon Bonaparte feigned the role of a mediator between the conflicting parties. He threatened renewed French military occupation and demanded that a delegation from all the cantons be sent to Paris. This Helvetic Consulta was to negotiate a new constitution. On 12 January 1803, Napoleon finally decided to merge the cantons of Aargau and Baden. This decision was entirely in line with the wishes of the Aargau delegation, which was led by Philipp Albert Stapfer. After the people of Fricktal had successfully petitioned against the division of this region into a Basel and an Aargau part, Napoleon decreed the merger of the entire region with Aargau on 2 February.

The members of the Consulta finally signed the revised Act of Mediation, which was approved by Napoleon, on 19 February 1803. This resulted in the dissolution of the centralised Helvetic Republic and the establishment of a loose confederation of states, with Aargau as an independent canton. Furthermore, Napoleon established the definitive border. The canton of Aargau acquired the western portion of the district of Aarburg and the Lucerne district of Merenschwand, yet was obliged to relinquish the district of Hitzkirch to Lucerne and the municipalities of Dietikon, Hüttikon, Oetwil an der Limmat and Schlieren to Zurich. Aarau was designated as the capital.

== New Canton ==
=== Government structure ===
Napoleon Bonaparte established the canton of Aargau, an artificial entity comprising four distinct regions of the country, whose inhabitants exhibited minimal shared characteristics and no common historical legacy. In the year of its foundation, Aargau had a population of 131,000, of whom 67,000 lived in the reformed Bernese Aargau and 64,000 in the Catholic areas of Freiamt, Fricktal and the County of Baden. There was no recognised state authority, and thus a completely new state had to be established on this basis.

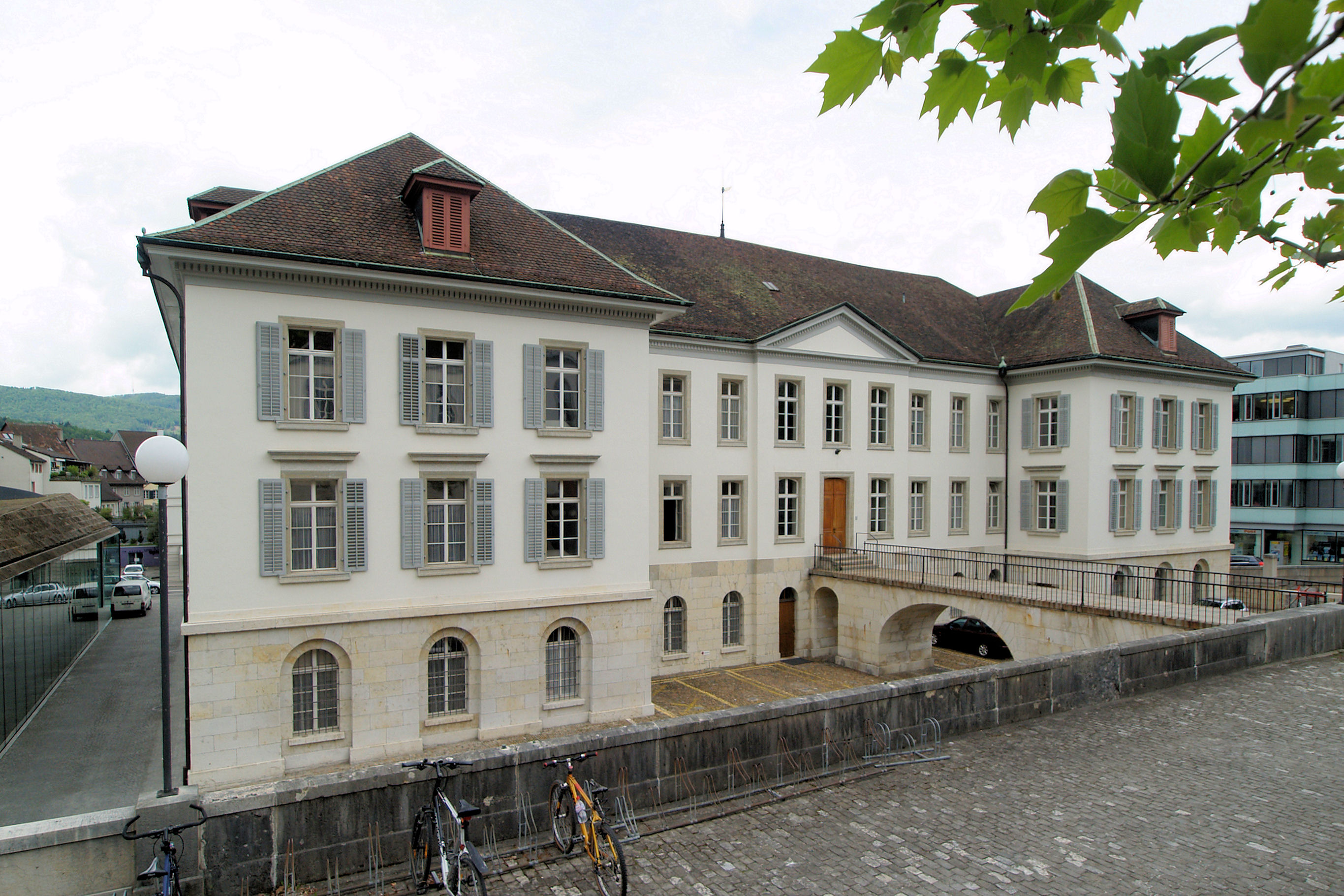
Government building in Aarau

The recently adopted Aargau cantonal constitution established that the majority of authority resided with the nine-member Small Council. The Grand Council, the parliament comprising 150 members, was only authorised to approve or reject laws, but not to make any amendments to them. The strict age and wealth limits in electoral law ensured that only approximately seven per cent of the population were eligible to vote (so-called active citizens). The concept of separation of powers was entirely alien to the system. Indeed, the members of the Small Council were also members of the Grand Council and were elected from their ranks.

The most pressing tasks were the establishment of a legal framework and the formation of a cantonal administration, which initially comprised just 15 civil servants. The government and parliament initially convened in Aarau town hall. Between 1811 and 1823, a former inn in Aarau was converted into a distinguished government building. The Grand Council building, the seat of the cantonal parliament, was inaugurated in 1829. The introduction of new symbols to reinforce the sense of community was also of significant importance: in 1803, Samuel Ringier from Zofingen created the new cantonal coat of arms.

=== Canton of culture ===
The new canton assumed a prominent position in Switzerland in the cultural and educational realms. The cantonal school in Aarau, the inaugural Gymnasium in Switzerland whose instructors were not members of the clergy, had already been established by a private entity in 1802. The school was subsequently taken over by the canton in 1813 and developed into one of the most respected gymnasiums in the country due to its liberal attitude, producing numerous well-known politicians and three Nobel Prize winners, including Albert Einstein. Aargau also played a pioneering role in the lower school levels. In 1805, one of the first secondary schools for young women was established in the former Olsberg convent, which was considered very progressive at the time. In 1835, the former Latin schools were also taken over by the canton and converted into progymnasial district schools. With the purchase of the Zurlauben collection in 1803, the foundation was laid for the cantonal library in Aarau, which opened in 1807.

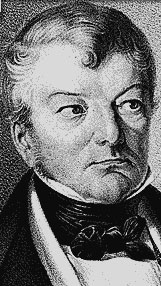
Heinrich Zschokke

In 1811, Heinrich Zschokke and numerous fellow campaigners founded the "Society for Patriotic Culture." The society, whose members included numerous prominent politicians and business leaders, created a savings fund, supported the founding and equipping of numerous schools and welfare institutions, and promoted the general education of the people with early forms of adult education centres. The society's numerous activities, which radiated throughout Switzerland, earned Aargau the nickname "canton of culture." The concept of supporting charitable causes out of pure patriotism was novel at the time and met with scepticism, particularly among conservative circles.

Those in favour of the old order were more concerned about the liberal Aargau press, which was permitted to flourish unhindered in contrast to other cantons than they were about the cultural society. From 1804, Heinrich Zschokke published the Schweizer Boten, one of the most widely read newspapers in Switzerland during the 19th century. In 1814, Paul Usteri established the Aarauer Zeitung, which ceased publication in 1821 due to numerous protests from foreign aristocrats and diplomats. Usteri subsequently relocated to Zurich, where he facilitated the transition of the Neue Zürcher Zeitung into Switzerland's leading liberal newspaper. Nevertheless, even after this, censorship in Aargau remained comparatively lenient, with the full abolition of censorship occurring in 1829.

=== Threat to continued existence ===
France's "tutelage" lasted until 1813. On 21 December of that year, German, Russian and Austrian troops crossed the Rhine and pursued the French troops, who retreated to southern Germany and France. In total, more than 80,000 foreign soldiers marched through northern Aargau. The foreign armies brought with them a devastating typhus epidemic. It is estimated that approximately 3,000 Austrian soldiers died in the military hospitals in Klingnau. The population was also affected to some extent, particularly in the Rheinfelden district.

Following the restoration of power in Bern to the aristocratic circles, who had received assistance from Napoleon's opponents, the reincorporation of the Aargau as a subject territory was demanded. Zug laid claim to the upper Freiamt. At the Congress of Vienna, the continued existence of the canton of Aargau was at stake. The Aargau delegate Albrecht Rengger demonstrated his negotiating abilities, thus preventing the restoration of the old order. On 20 March 1815, the major European powers guaranteed the continued existence of the nascent canton. The people of Aargau were able to rely on the support of the Russian Tsar Alexander I, who had a close relationship with Switzerland through his tutor Frédéric-César de La Harpe.

=== Restoration and regeneration ===
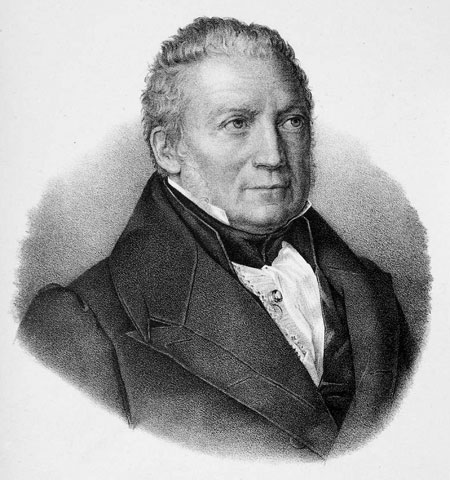
Johannes Herzog

In the wake of the Restoration, conservative forces implemented a revision of the cantonal constitution in 1814. The Small Council was expanded from nine to thirteen members, its term of office was extended from five to twelve years, and the popular election of the Grand Council was further restricted. Consequently, only forty-eight out of one hundred and fifty Grand Councillors could now be elected directly by the people. The Grand Council itself elected 52 members, while an electoral college chose the remaining 50 Grand Councillors. Authorities had to be made up of equal numbers of Catholic and Reformed members. Despite this constitution, which is undemocratic by today's standards, Aargau was considered one of the most liberal cantons in Switzerland. After all, freedom of establishment and trade was enshrined and all professional privileges were abolished.

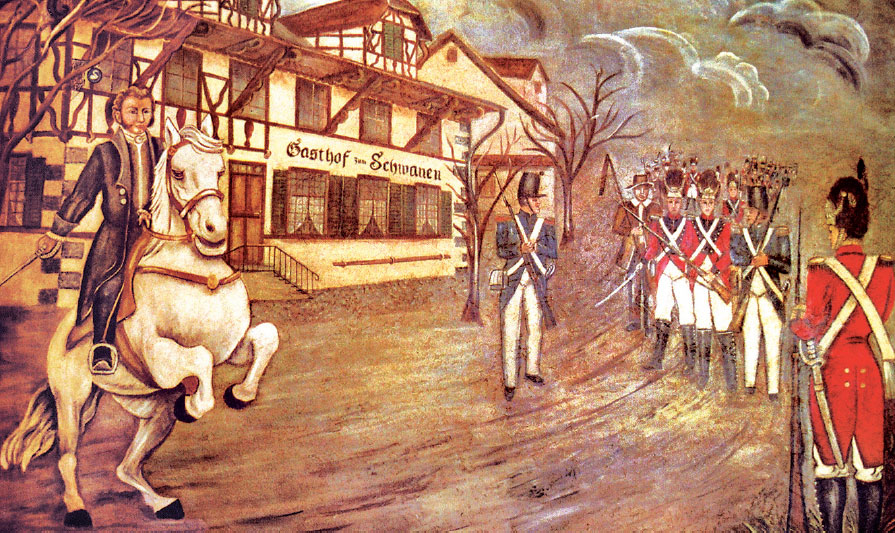
Freiämtersturm

The government became increasingly authoritarian, leading to the emergence of the "Duchy of Aargau" as a metaphorical reference to Small Councillor Johannes Herzog, who dominated the government and styled himself "von Effingen," despite not being of noble birth. The government's inability to reform led to the formation of an opposition movement in the autumn of 1830. On 7 November, approximately 3,000 to 4,000 individuals gathered in Wohlenschwil to demand constitutional reforms. The elections to the Grand Council, scheduled for 17 November, were only held properly in 26 of 48 constituencies due to the prevailing unrest. Finally, on 5 and 6 December 1830, the Freiämtersturm took place. Between 5,000 and 6,000 armed men, led by Johann Heinrich Fischer, marched from Merenschwand and Wohlen to the cantonal capital and compelled the government to resign in a bloodless revolt.

The new constitution, which came into force in 1831, was the first to be approved in a referendum. The restrictive electoral law was relaxed, and the people now directly elected almost all the Grand Councillors. This represented a significant step towards the separation of powers, as the Grand Council (legislature) was now authorised to discuss and amend laws. The authority of the Small Council now designated the Government Council and comprising a mere nine members, was curtailed. Aargau was now among the vanguard of those engaged in the process of Regeneration.

=== Religious and political conflicts ===
The rift between the Reformed and Catholics deepened. The liberal government, dominated by the Reformed, sought to limit the influence of the Catholic Church, which the faithful perceived as an encroachment on their way of life. A contentious issue had already arisen in 1829 when Aargau was transferred from the diocese of Constance to the diocese of Basel against the wishes of the Catholics. The Baden Articles, passed by seven liberal cantons in 1834, served to exacerbate the situation. These Articles called for the establishment of a national bishopric independent of Rome and stronger state supervision in church matters. Those priests who did not swear allegiance to the Constitution were subject to fines or imprisonment. Furthermore, the canton placed the assets of the monasteries under state supervision, closed the monastery schools and imposed a ban on the further admission of novices.

The 1831 constitution provided for a total revision within ten years. The new constitution, drawn up at the end of 1840, was almost identical to the old one and was rejected in the referendum. The liberals objected to parity, the principle that there had to be an equal number of Reformed and Catholics in all authorities. The second draft was favourable to them and was approved by 58% on 5 January 1841. The approval rate varied considerably, ranging from 0% in the Catholic constituency of Rohrdorf to 99% in the Reformed constituency of Brugg. Conservative-Catholic circles around the Bünz Committee were not prepared to accept the result and instigated riots in Freiamt and the Baden region. Government troops swiftly suppressed them, and by 12 January the situation had returned to normal. The conflict was characterised by a single minor skirmish near Villmergen, during which two government soldiers and seven insurgents died.

On 13 January the Catholic seminary director Augustin Keller delivered a diatribe at the Grand Council. He described the monasteries as the source of all evil and the mastermind behind the conservative coup attempt, and called for their immediate abolition. The government did not require any further prompting and proceeded to confiscate the monasteries' assets in a gross breach of the constitution. The nuns were given an eight-day deadline, while the monks were required to leave the canton within 48 hours. Although some monasteries had already been secularised following the canton's foundation, the severity of this measure led to the Aargau Monastery controversy. This almost resulted in a war with Austria and was only settled in 1843 with the re-authorisation of four women's monasteries.

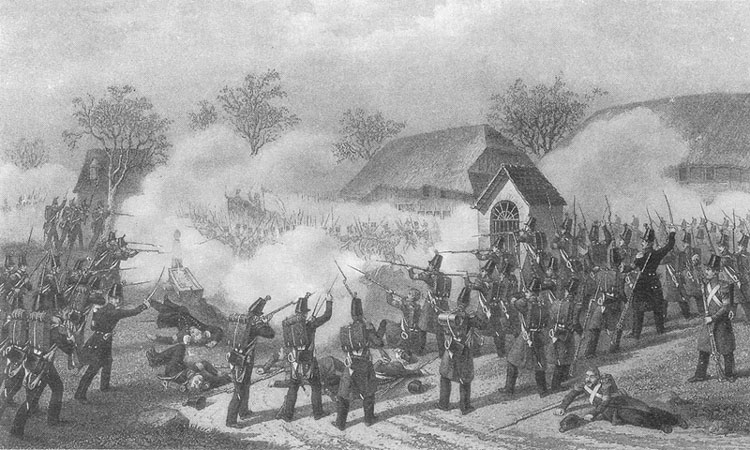
Battle of Geltwil

Subsequently, the canton of Aargau played a pivotal role in the Free Guard campaigns (1844/45) and the agitation against the Jesuits, who had been employed as teachers by the new conservative government in Lucerne. The cantons of Central Switzerland, Valais and Fribourg joined to form the Sonderbund. The refusal to dissolve this union led to the Sonderbund War in 1847. Government Councillor Friedrich Frey-Herosé (later Federal Councillor) was the Chief of Staff of the Tagsatzung troops. The Battle of Geltwil on 12 November 1847 was the only armed conflict on Aargau territory. Following the defeat of the conservatives, the confederation was dissolved in 1848 and gave way to the federal state that still exists today. Confessional tensions gradually subsided as a result, with other problems now taking centre stage.

The fifth constitution of 1852 introduced further improvements in terms of the separation of powers and was no longer controversial, even among Catholics. It was not until 1863 that the Jews were granted full equality with the other citizens of the canton. Consequently, they migrated to the large cities, where they found better employment opportunities. The old denominational differences resurfaced briefly after 1870 when Aargau assumed a leading role in the Kulturkampf. In Fricktal in particular, numerous adherents joined the new Christian Catholic Church. The sixth constitution of 1885 finally reconciled the Reformed and Catholics, expanded the people's rights, and formed the basis of the state until 1980.

=== From a farming to an industrial canton ===
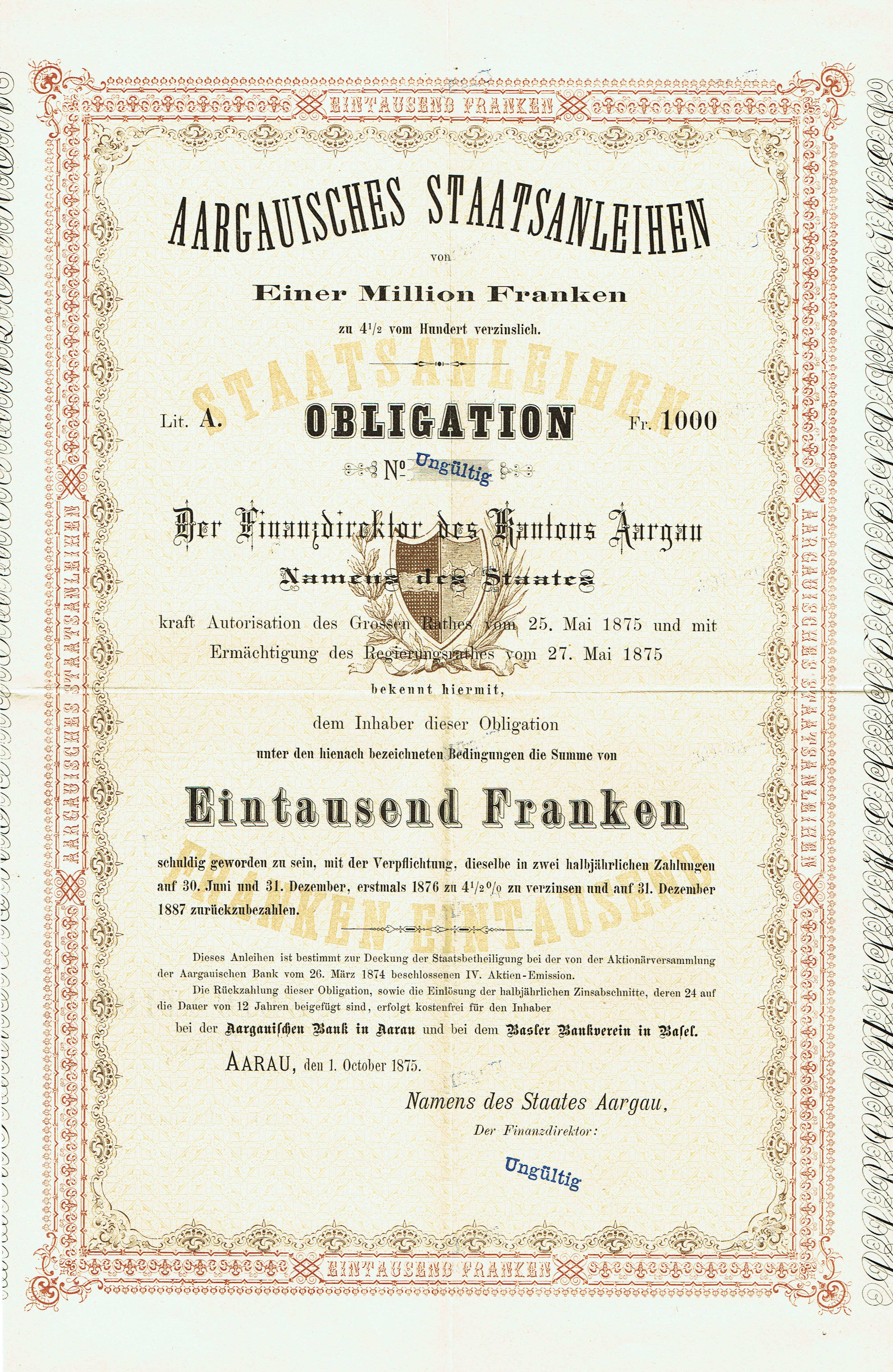
Bond for 1000 francs from the Canton of Aargau dated 1 October 1875.

In the second half of the 18th century, three-field farming, which had been practised since the early Middle Ages, was gradually replaced by crop rotation in agriculture. This was accompanied by the establishment of potato cultivation. The dissolution of the commons had created a lot of pastureland, which led to an increase in livestock farming. This process was completed around 1830 and led to an unprecedented increase in productivity. The replacement of the tithes lasted until 1850. In the second half of the nineteenth century, grain cultivation was replaced by dairy farming and fodder cultivation due to the cheap imports that were now possible thanks to the railway. The last famine occurred in 1816 in the so-called Year Without a Summer and resulted in a major wave of emigration.

Before 1800 the earliest forms of industry had only developed in Bernese Aargau. Favoured by the targeted economic policy of the Bernese rulers, numerous textile factories and trading companies were established. The towns of Aarau, Lenzburg and Zofingen were the main beneficiaries of this development. The other small towns in the Aargau initially retained their role as market and craft centres. The rest of the canton was almost exclusively agricultural. By the end of the 18th century, there were no factories in the County of Baden or the Fricktal. However, there were at least a few straw weavers in Freiamt. In 1810, Johannes Herzog constructed the first mechanical spinning mill in Aarau. Factories, which mainly processed cotton, silk and straw, were also established in other locations. By the end of the 1830s, the tobacco industry had been established in the Wyna valley and the upper Seetal.

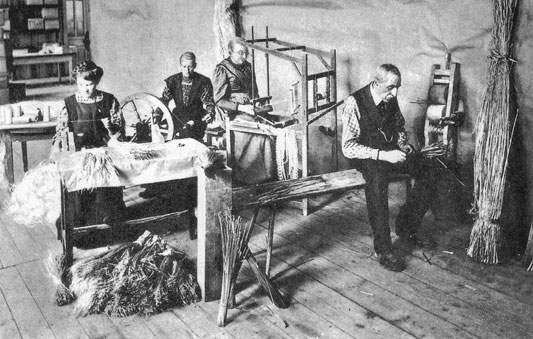
Wickerwork industry in Wohlen around 1900

The straw and wickerwork industry, centred in Wohlen and the rest of the Freiamt, became the most important branch of industry in the second third of the 19th century, exporting its products all over the world. Its importance declined rapidly after 1900 when cheaper East Asian products came onto the market, and it almost disappeared after 1960. At its peak around 1860, almost 30,000 people were employed in the straw industry, most of them at home.

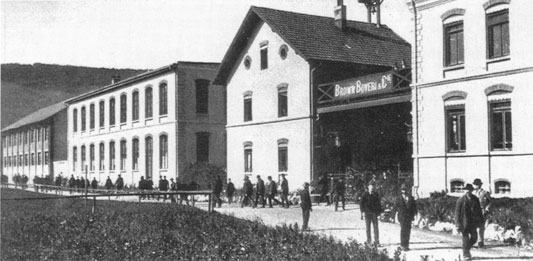
Entrance to Brown, Boveri & Cie in Baden around 1900

Benefiting from the political stability after 1848 and the construction of the railways, new industries were soon added. These included the cement industry in the Aare Valley and salt mining and brewing in the western Fricktal. But textiles remained by far the most important industry. Nearly all factories depended on watercourses for their power; in 1859 there were only eleven steam engines in the whole canton.

From 1860 the metalworking industry began to develop in the Limmat and Reuss valleys, as did the shoe industry in a decentralised manner. Brown, Boveri & Cie was founded in Baden in 1892 as part of the project for the first hydroelectric power station in Aargau. The company manufactured generators, turbines and motors and quickly made the Baden region the centre of the Swiss electrical industry. From 1890, the mechanical engineering industry also began to expand in Aargau.

The first local savings banks were established in 1812. From 1850 several commercial banks were established, including the Aargauische Bank, founded in 1854 by the politician and railway pioneer Carl Feer-Herzog, which became the Aargauische Kantonalbank in 1913. Apart from the spa towns of Baden, Schinznach-Bad and Rheinfelden, tourism did not play a major role. In 1900, 43.4% of the workforce was employed in agriculture, 42.4% in industry and 14.2% in services.

=== Expansion of transport infrastructure ===
The rapid economic development of the 19th century would have been unthinkable without a well-developed transport infrastructure. Although only a few new roads had to be built after the canton was founded, the majority were in a precarious state. Consequently, goods and passengers were transported by boat on the rivers, which was not without danger due to the numerous rapids and shallows that existed at the time. The new canton initially used a significant proportion of its tax revenue for road construction. The most significant projects were the connections from Aarau via Staffelegg to Frick, from Bremgarten via Mutschellen to Dietikon, between Laufenburg and Koblenz and between Lenzburg and Reinach. When the canton assumed responsibility for the postal service in 1804, there were only ten post offices in the entire canton of Aargau. The daily stagecoach service between Aarau and Zurich commenced in 1820. By the time the Confederation assumed responsibility for the postal service in 1849, the number of post offices had increased tenfold.

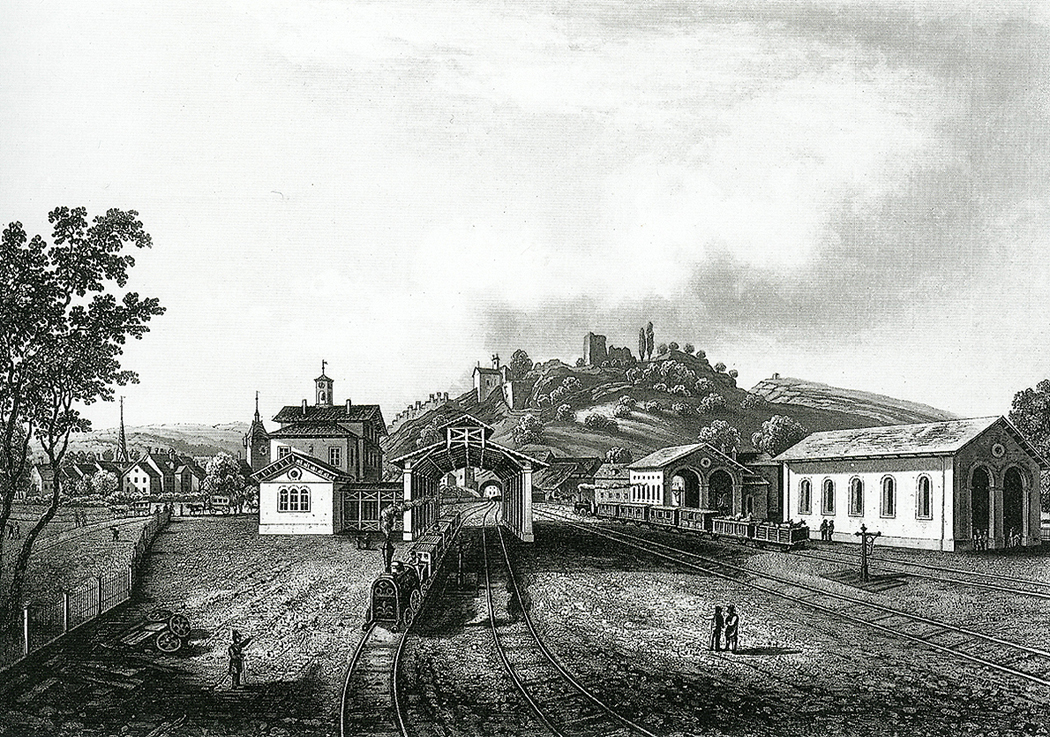
Baden railway station in the year 1850.

The railway was the catalyst for a revolution in the field of transport. In 1837, a private initiative from Zurich presented a project for a line from Zurich via Baden, Koblenz, Laufenburg and Rheinfelden to Basel. However, all Swiss railway projects initially failed due to the "small-state-ery" and the unstable political situation. Finally, on 7 August 1847, the Swiss Northern Railway opened Switzerland's first railway line between Zurich and Baden. Further construction stalled and could only be continued after the Nordbahn was merged into the Swiss Northeastern Railway (NOB). The latter constructed the Baden-Turgi-Brugg (1856), Brugg-Wildegg-Aarau (1858) and Turgi-Koblenz-Waldshut (1859) lines. The west of the canton was opened up by lines of the Swiss Central Railway (SCB). The construction of the Aarau-Olten-Aarburg-Emmenbrücke (1856) and Aarburg-Bern (1857) lines further expanded the network of the two largest Swiss railway companies, which met in Aarau to complete the basic network.

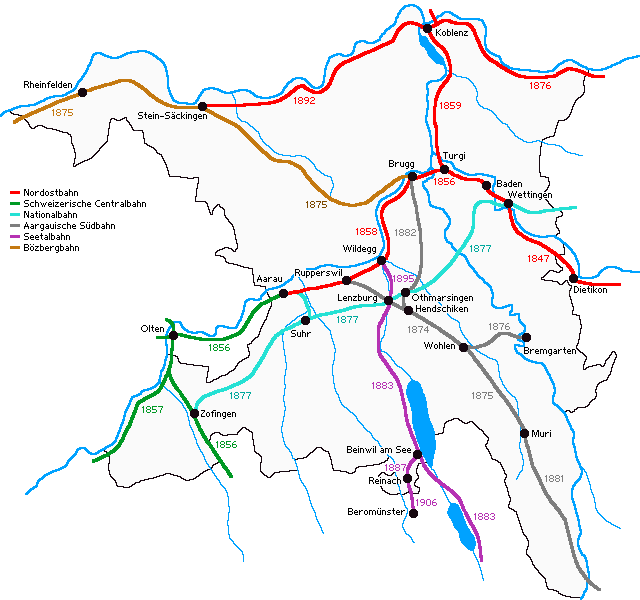
Development of the railway network up to 1900

After 1870, a period of railway expansion commenced throughout Switzerland, including in Aargau. Joint subsidiaries were established by the NOB and SCB, and the Bözberg line between Brugg and Basel was constructed and opened in 1875. Additionally, the Aargau Southern Railway between Rupperswil and Rotkreuz was built and connected to the new Gotthard railway between 1874 and 1881. Additionally, the NOB constructed the Wohlen-Bremgarten branch line in 1876 and the Hendschiken-Brugg line in 1882. The NOB also constructed a line along the Rhine, which was opened in two stages (1876 and 1892). The Seetal railway line, which was established with British capital, inaugurated the Lenzburg-Lucerne route in 1883. The extension to Wildegg was subsequently completed in 1895, while the branch line from Beinwil am See to Beromünster was opened in two stages in 1887 and 1906.

The Swiss National Railway (SNB) commenced operations in 1877. The company planned a second east–west main line between Lake Constance and Lake Geneva, which was to compete with the established "gentlemen's railway" of high finance as a broad-based "people's railway". In Aargau, the line ran from Würenlos via Wettingen, Lenzburg and Suhr to Zofingen (with a branch from Suhr to Aarau). However, the SNB went bankrupt as early as 1878 and was purchased at auction by the NOB for a fraction of its value. The municipalities along the route had invested a significant amount of capital and were consequently burdened with substantial financial obligations as a consequence of the bankruptcy. In certain instances, the repayment of debts extended into the 1930s.

=== Population ===
During the first half of the 19th century, the population of the region in question increased by almost 60 per cent (1798: 125,669 inhabitants; 1850: 199,852 inhabitants), primarily due to a high birth surplus. This trend reversed after 1850. For almost 40 years, Aargau was the only canton with a declining population (1888: 193,580 inhabitants). This was due to numerous economic crises, which resulted in many Aargau residents having to leave their canton. The majority of these individuals relocated to large cities such as Zurich and Basel, while around a third emigrated overseas (mostly to the US). However, this development varied greatly from region to region. The exodus had a particularly significant impact on rural communities, with the upper Fricktal and Zurzibiet experiencing a notable decline in population (the community of Baldingen, for example, lost almost half of its population). In contrast, industrial centres such as Aarau, Baden, Brugg, Rheinfelden and Wettingen demonstrated a notable increase in population. From 1890 onwards, there was another slight increase in population, with a total of 206,498 individuals recorded in 1900.

== 20th and 21st centuries ==
=== Impact of the World Wars ===
The outbreak of the First World War caught the population completely unprepared, leading to a surge in hoarding and a subsequent increase in food prices. Despite modest price control measures, these were ineffective in the context of high inflation and long periods of military operations, which resulted in significant material hardship for large sections of the population throughout the war. In the summer of 1918, the Spanish flu broke out. As there were insufficient hospitals to care for the numerous individuals afflicted with illness, 20 regional emergency hospitals were established. Despite the cantonal government's prohibition of public gatherings, approximately 750 individuals perished from the virus in Aargau by May 1919, with approximately one-tenth of the population becoming infected. The national strike in November 1918 was particularly popular in the industrial centre of Baden. The cantonal government was concerned that a revolutionary upheaval might occur and deployed 3,000 to 4,000 soldiers to protect those willing to work, set up checkpoints and prevent any outbreaks of violence. After three days, the national strike ended without incident.

In response to the national strike, right-wing conservative circles established vigilante groups in various municipalities without any legal basis. Eugen Bircher unified these groups in the Aargau Patriotic Association, which at times had over 15,000 members and exerted a significant influence on the anti-communist Swiss Patriotic Federation. The consequences of the Great Depression were felt in Aargau in the form of company closures and rising unemployment figures. In response to the economic crisis, the cantonal government implemented numerous employment programs, which primarily focused on infrastructure construction. In 1933, the National Front, influenced by the National Socialist seizure of power in the neighbouring German Reich, attempted to gain a foothold in the region. It organized rallies, published propaganda newspapers, and established local groups. However, it only won one seat in the 1937 parliamentary elections and subsequently disappeared into obscurity.

Switzerland was demonstrably better prepared for the outbreak of the Second World War in September 1939 than it had been a quarter of a century earlier. To ward off a possible German attack, the 5th Division was deployed to cover the Aargau border region and occupy positions in the Jura, along the Rhine and on the Limmat line. In the summer of 1941, it was withdrawn following the réduit strategy and relocated to the Alpine region. From the outset of the war, food was rationed. As part of the "Anbauschlacht" initiative, the arable land in Aargau was expanded by 113% through clearing, melioration and conversion of grassland. By 1945, arable land accounted for 42% of the cultivated land, compared to 23% at the beginning of the war. To continue importing the raw materials that were urgently needed, Switzerland was forced to co-operate economically with the Axis powers. Aargau power plants supplied electricity to Germany, and the Allies blacklisted numerous Aargau companies (above all Brown, Boveri & Cie.).

From 1940 some 2,000 Polish soldiers were interned in 19 camps in the canton. They were employed in agriculture and road construction, with the most notable example being the "Polenstrasse" in Thalheim. Furthermore, there were an additional 1,000 internees (including deserters and escaped prisoners of war). Allied aircraft dropped bombs over the Aargau on several occasions. This resulted in significant damage to buildings in Koblenz, Full-Reuenthal, Leuggern and Sins. At the end of April 1945, several thousand German refugees crossed the border and were housed in camps. In contrast to orders given to retreating Wehrmacht soldiers, they did not carry out the destruction of the Rhine power stations.

=== Political development ===
Following the comprehensive revision of the cantonal constitution in 1885, the people of Aargau adopted a cautious approach to the introduction of further popular rights, demonstrating a lack of enthusiasm for progress. The canton of Aargau was one of the last to implement the popular election of members of the cantonal government and the Council of States in 1904. The introduction of proportional representation at the cantonal level was not until 1920 (29 years after the canton of Ticino). Although women were eligible for election to cantonal councils for the poor from 1936 and for school boards from 1940, full voting rights for women were not introduced until 1971.

The first political parties emerged in the 1890s. The Catholic-Conservative Party (now the Christian Democratic People's Party) was founded in 1892, followed by the Free Democratic Party in 1894. In 1902, the early labour movements joined the Social Democratic Party. Until the introduction of proportional representation, the Free Democrats held a majority both in parliament and in government. The Social Democrats subsequently ascended to become the most powerful party, a position they retained until 1981. Following the establishment of farmers' parties in 1917, these parties merged in 1936 to form the Party of Farmers, Traders and Independents. The resulting Swiss People's Party was able to significantly expand its electoral base from the 1980s onwards, becoming the party with the largest number of voters. Other parties represented in the Grand Council are (or were) the Evangelical People's Party (since 1921), the Alliance of Independents (1937–2001), the Young Farmers' Movement (1937–1957), the Green Party (since 1985), the Auto Party (1991–2005), the Conservative Democratic Party (since 2009) and the Green Liberal Party (since 2009). The nationalist Republican movement reached its zenith in the 1960s, subsequently merging into the Swiss Democrats.

The number of members of the Grand Council was fixed at 200 in 1952; since 2005, it has been 140. The comprehensive revision of the cantonal constitution, which commenced in 1972, was relatively moderate following an initial period of enthusiastic reorganization. The new constitution came into force in 1980, following the rejection of an initial draft in 1979 that sought to replace the mandatory with the optional legislative and financial referendum. The state's catalogue of fundamental rights and duties was updated, and the Grand Council was also given planning powers. Since 1966, larger municipalities replaced their municipal assemblies with residents' councils, as they found it increasingly challenging to achieve a negotiating capacity (according to the law at the time, at least half of those entitled to vote had to be present at municipal assemblies). By 1974, 15 municipalities had made use of this option. Nevertheless, between 1981 and 1997, Aarburg, Oftringen, Spreitenbach and Suhr reverted to the previous system for a variety of reasons.

=== Economy ===
==== Agriculture ====
In 1880 vineyards covered an area of approximately 2,700 hectares. Following the impact of phylloxera and mildew in Aargau after 1900, the area under vines shrank to 330 hectares by 1935. The lowest point was reached around 1965 with 212 hectares. Since that time, the area under vines has increased again, reaching over 400 hectares. This growth is largely attributable to the efforts of amateur winegrowers. The most prevalent varieties cultivated are Müller-Thurgau (also known in Switzerland as Riesling x Sylvaner) and Pinot noir. The most significant growing regions are the Lower Aare Valley, the Lower Surbtal, the Limmatt Valley, the Upper Fricktal and the Schenkenbergertal.

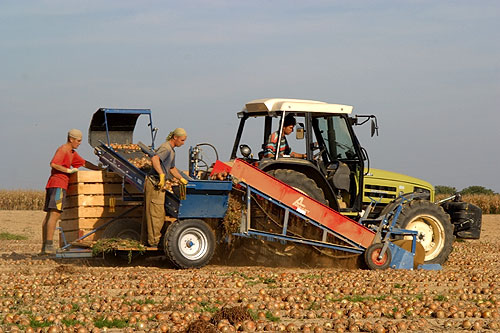
Onion harvest near Möhlin.

The mechanisation of agriculture commenced in 1900, initially resulting in an increase in productivity and subsequently causing a reduction in the workforce. By 1941, the proportion of individuals employed in agriculture was 21%, declining to just under 3% by 2000. The number of farms in Switzerland fell from 18,777 in 1939 to 6,845 in 1990, while the average farm size increased from 4.5 to 9.5 hectares over the same period. Since the 1950s, the cultivation of sugar beet and maize has been the dominant agricultural practice. The fruit trees and hedges that were once abundant have largely disappeared as a result of melioration and the consolidation of estates. The excessive use of fertilisers has resulted in a high level of pollution in the waters, with Lake Hallwil, for example, requiring the introduction of artificial aeration since 1986.

==== Electricity sector ====
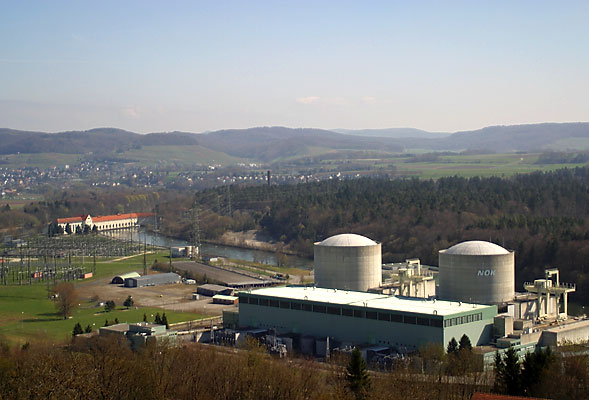
Beznau Nuclear Power Plant

The introduction of electricity played a significant role in the industrialisation of the region. The abundance of water in the Aargau facilitated the construction of hydroelectric power stations. Between 1892 and 1914, ten plants with an output of more than one megawatt were constructed, six by 1945 and three more by 1966. The plants significantly altered the landscape with their dams and backwaters. The numerous rapids and gravel banks disappeared almost completely, as did the floodplains. In 1935, the Klingnau reservoir was dammed during the construction of the Klingnau power plant, and in 1975 the Flachsee on the Reuss was dammed. Several energy supply companies based in Aargau were established, including AEW, Axpo, Motor-Columbus and EGL. In 1993, a popular initiative was adopted that requires the canton to renaturalise the river banks and establish a floodplain conservation park. This park should cover one per cent of the canton's area, which equates to approximately 14 km^{2}, by 2014.

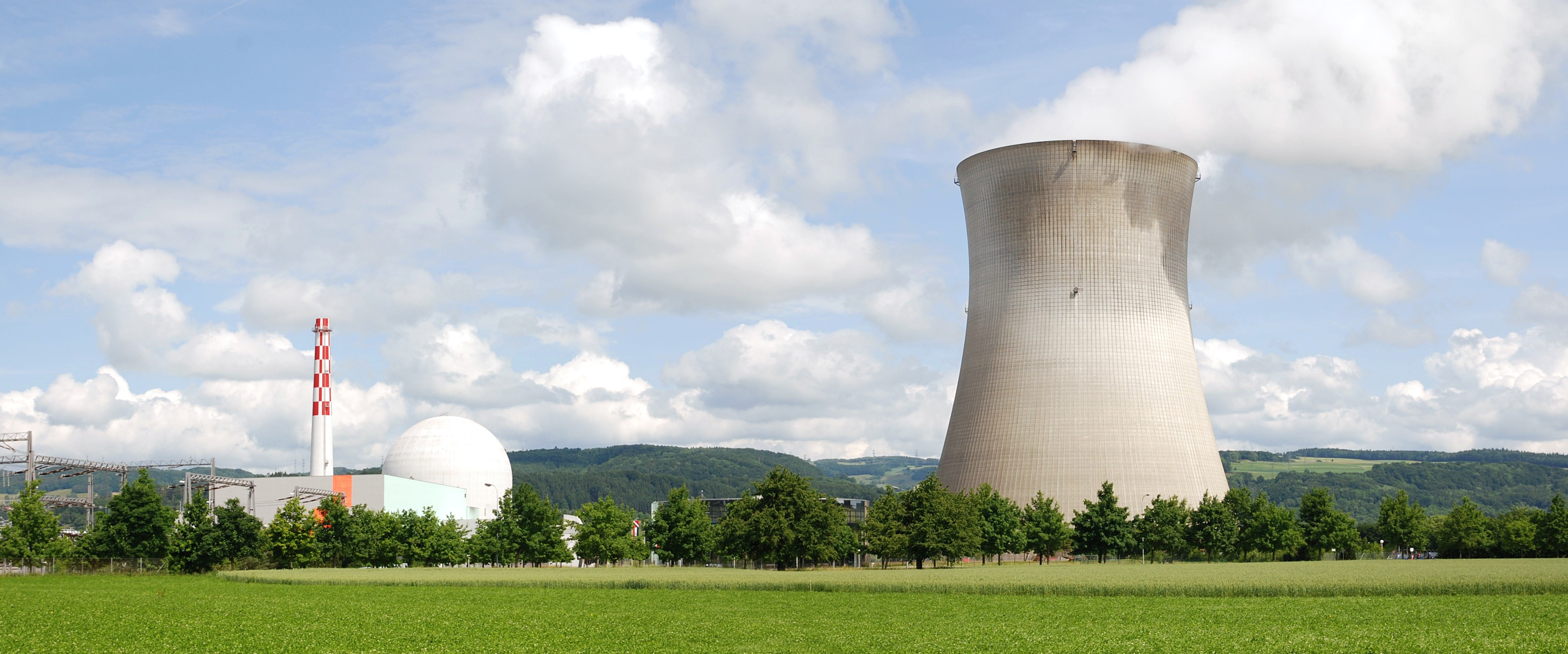
Leibstadt Nuclear Power Plant

The rivers also offered ideal conditions for the construction of nuclear power plants, which require large quantities of cooling water. The Beznau Nuclear Power Plant (Block A in 1969, Block B in 1971) was opened without any major protests. In contrast, the situation was different with the construction of the Leibstadt Nuclear Power Plant, which was met with significant opposition. Following the reactor incident at Three Mile Island, new safety regulations were introduced, and the plant could only be inaugurated in 1984 after eleven years of construction. The construction was also accompanied by fierce protests. The planned Kaiseraugst Nuclear Power Plant failed due to fierce opposition from the population and environmental groups. The most spectacular action was an eleven-week occupation of the construction site in 1975. The project was finally abandoned in 1988.

The Swiss Federal Institute for Reactor Research (EIR) was established in 1960, followed by the Swiss Institute of Nuclear Physics (SIN) in 1968. The latter institution gave rise to the Paul Scherrer Institute (a multidisciplinary research institute specialising in nuclear research) in Villigen and Würenlingen in 1988. Currently, Aargau generates approximately a quarter of Switzerland's total electricity output, a figure that has earned it the sobriquet "Energy Canton." The canton is occasionally derisively referred to as "Nuclear Aargau."

==== Industry ====
By 1910, 51% of all employees were already engaged in industrial work. The machine, metal and apparatus industries (and the electrical industry in the Baden region) became increasingly significant, displacing the textile industry from the top position around 1920. Concurrently, home-based work became less prevalent. The district of Baden benefited most from industrialisation and rose to become the most populous district. This was largely due to the success of Brown, Boveri & Cie (BBC), which became the largest private employer in Switzerland. By 1930, Aargau was the third most industrialised canton in Switzerland, behind Solothurn and Glarus. The economic crises at the beginning of the 1920s and in the 1930s led to the closure of many businesses, particularly in the textile industry. Following the economic boom and the influx of foreign labour in the post-war period, there was a marked expansion of industrial and construction capacity. By 1960, the proportion of the population employed in the industry had risen to 62 per cent.

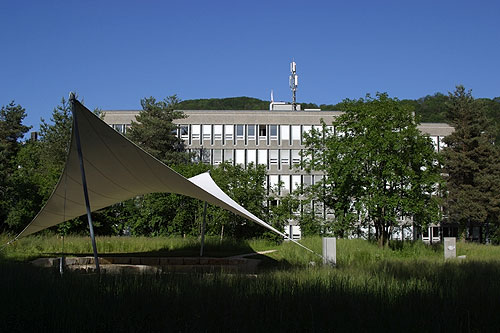
Former LafargeHolcim Group headquarters in Wildegg

A growing number of companies from the Zurich and Basel areas relocated their space-intensive production sites to Aargau. This is particularly evident in the case of the Basel chemical industry, which has constructed several large production facilities in the lower Fricktal. In addition, numerous Aargau companies have expanded their operations, such as BBC, which has outsourced its production to Birrfeld and the Lenzburg area. The production of cement remains a significant industry in the region, with the majority of facilities concentrated in the Aare Valley and the Zurzibiet. Holderbank (now LafargeHolcim), named after the municipality of the same name, grew to become the second-largest cement group in the world.

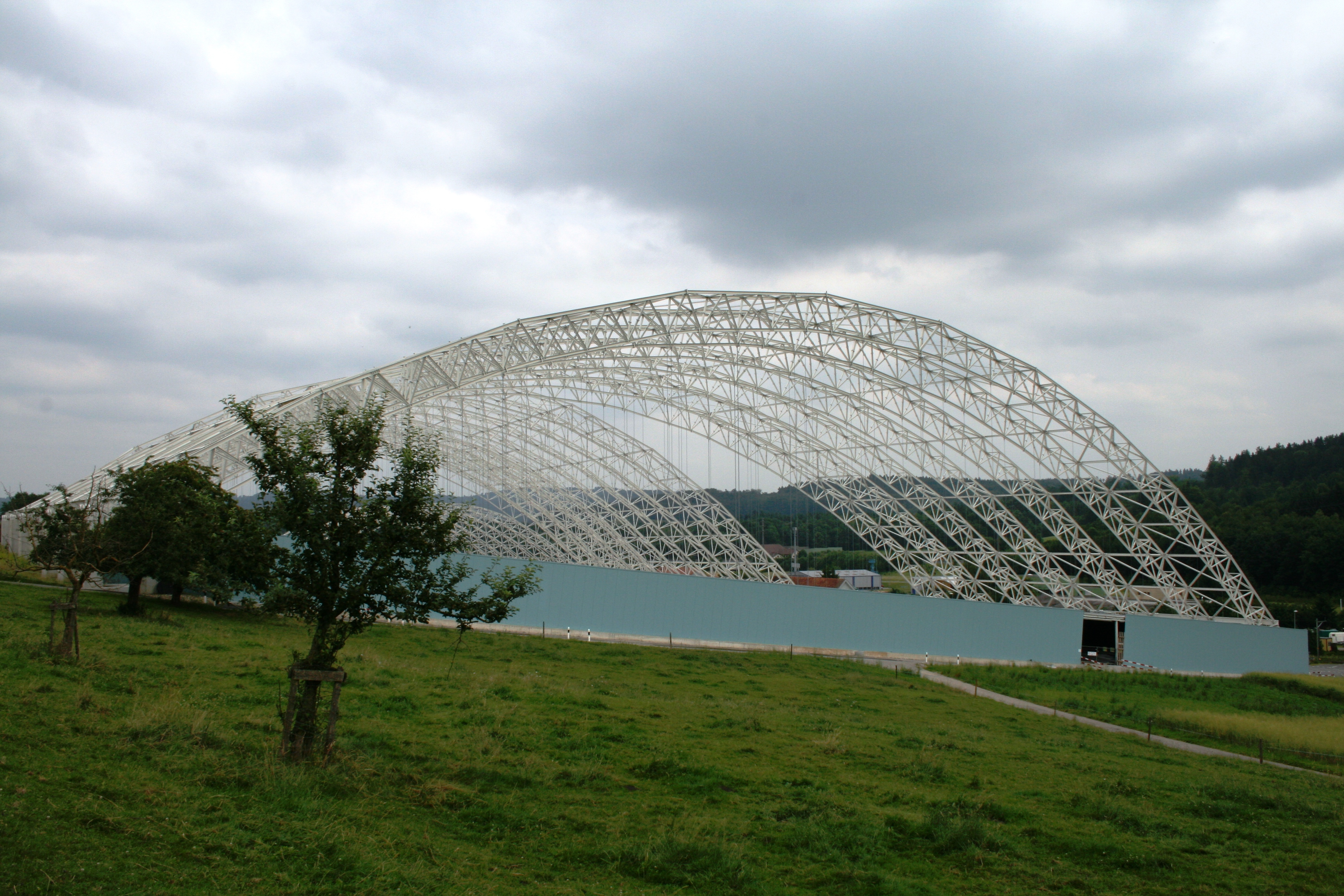
Kölliken hazardous waste landfill

The structural change that occurred in the mid-1970s as a result of the economic crisis did not have the same impact on Aargau as it did on other regions. This was due to the more diverse range of industries present in the canton. However, the service sector has since become the most important economic sector in Aargau, with small and medium-sized enterprises becoming increasingly important. In 2008, the proportion of industrial jobs in the canton was still 34 per cent. The rapid expansion of industry following the Second World War also led to an increase in environmental pollution. Until the 1970s, waste was disposed of almost exclusively in landfill sites. The first waste incineration plant was established in Turgi in 1970, followed by two further plants in Buchs in 1973 and Oftringen in 1974. The Kölliken hazardous waste landfill, which commenced operations in 1978, is regarded as the largest contaminated site in Switzerland. Despite its relatively brief operational lifespan of seven years, the landfill is subject to extensive remediation. The remediation process, which commenced in 2005, is estimated to cost up to CHF 770 million.

==== Service sector ====
Although the proportion of people employed in the service sector rose steadily throughout the 20th century, it consistently remained below the national average. For a considerable period, Aargau was regarded as a typical industrial canton. It was not until the mid-1980s that the share of industry was surpassed, with the proportion amounting to 62 per cent in 2008. The canton of Aargau benefited from its excellent road network, which facilitated the establishment of a greater number of logistics companies and shopping centres than would be expected given its size. Tourism remained a relatively minor industry, with the addition of a fourth spa in Bad Zurzach in 1955, in addition to the traditional spas in Baden, Rheinfelden and Schinznach-Bad.

=== Transport ===
==== Railway ====
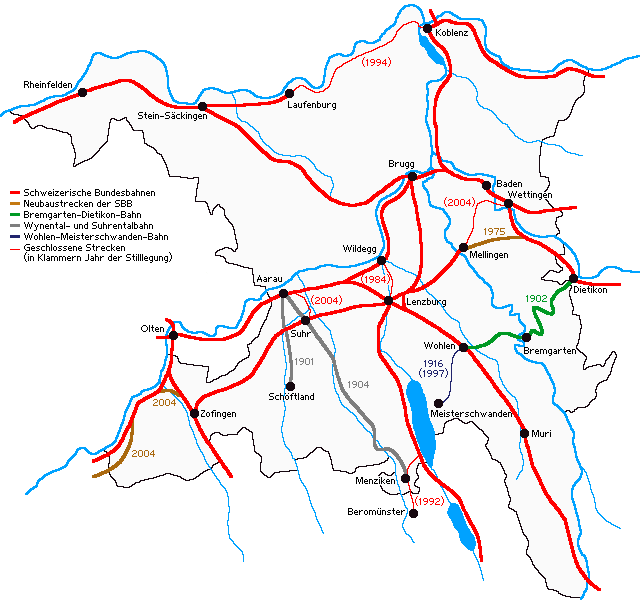
Development of the railway network to date.

Following the turn of the century, only a few new railway lines were constructed. These railways, which were electric from the outset, were primarily used for local transport. The Aarau-Schöftland Railway was inaugurated in 1901, followed by the Wynental Railway in 1904. These two-metre-gauge railways merged in 1967 to form the Wynental and Suhrental Railway (WSB). In 1902, the Bremgarten–Dietikon Railway, also metre-gauge, commenced operations. In 1912 it leased the Wohlen-Bremgarten West line from the SBB. The standard gauge Wohlen-Meisterschwanden railway was completed in 1916.

The next significant extension was not realised until 1975. The Heitersberg tunnel between Mellingen and Killwangen considerably shortened the journey time on the Bern-Zurich route, as it eliminated the diversions via Brugg and Baden. At the same time, the large Limmattal marshalling yard went into operation in Spreitenbach. Since 1990, the Zurich S-Bahn has operated to Baden and Brugg, and since 1997 the Basel S-Bahn has connected the Fricktal. On some lines, passenger services were discontinued due to low usage or inadequate access quality and replaced by bus services. The following lines were replaced: Lenzburg-Wildegg (1984), Beinwil am See-Beromünster (1992), Laufenburg-Koblenz (1994) and Wohlen-Meisterschwanden (1997).

The most significant change occurred with the inauguration of the Rail 2000 project on 12 December 2004. This involved the opening of the new Mattstetten-Rothrist line and the "war loop" between Zofingen and Rothrist. The latter was originally constructed in 1941 but had not yet been operationalised. Conversely, the SBB ceased passenger traffic on the former national railway lines Aarau-Suhr and Mellingen-Wettingen. This was partially offset by the extension of the Zurich S-Bahn through the Heitersberg tunnel to Aarau. The former SBB sections Reinach-Menziken and Aarau-Suhr were converted to metre gauge and have been operated by the WSB since 2003 and 2010, respectively.

==== Road transport ====
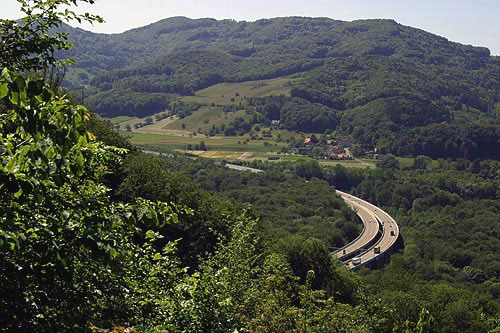
Aaretal viaduct on the A3 motorway near Habsburg

The expansion of the road network was a far more significant phenomenon than railway construction in the 20th century. The advent of the motor vehicle saw a rapid increase in the number of vehicles on the road, particularly after the Second World War. The most urgent task was initially to tarmac the gravel roads. In 1950, only 85 per cent of cantonal roads and 21 per cent of local roads had a hard surface. Twenty years later, all roads were fully paved.

Between 1966 and 1980 the A1 and A2 motorways were constructed on Aargau soil. The A3 initially ran between Kaiseraugst and Frick. The closure of the gap between Frick and the Birrfeld motorway junction was postponed until 1996 due to protracted negotiations over a route that would minimise environmental impact. Until 2003, the Baregg Tunnel near Baden constituted a significant bottleneck throughout Switzerland. Its elimination required the construction of a third tunnel tube. In addition to the motorways, a network of over 100 kilometres of four-lane expressways was planned. However, these projects were conceived in the utopian belief in progress of the 1960s, were ultimately abandoned following the economic crisis of the 1970s, and only a small fraction of them were realised.

Given that a significant proportion of both east–west and north–south traffic passes through Aargau (both by road and rail), Aargau is perceived as a "transit canton".

==== Waterways ====
Since the beginning of the 20th century there have been repeated plans to expand the waterways for large goods ships. One such project was the proposal to make the High Rhine navigable from Rheinfelden to Koblenz in 1913. Another, the Limmat Canal project, was presented in 1924 but was cancelled after the Second World War. In the early 1950s, the Trans-Helvetic Canal project was proposed between the mouth of the Aare and Lake Geneva. The barrages of the hydroelectric power stations would have been overcome with locks, and large river harbours were planned at Brugg, Klingnau and Full-Reuenthal, which would have completely changed the landscape. Over time, all of these projects were increasingly seen as unnecessary and unprofitable, and they also failed due to opposition from the local population and environmental protection groups (above all the Working Group for the Protection of the Aare). Consequently, the projects were finally shelved in 1989.

=== Population ===
From 1890 the population began to grow again, particularly in the industrial areas and especially in the Baden region. The proportion of Swiss citizens not born in Aargau rose from 8 to 31 per cent between 1888 and 1950. The proportion of foreigners reached a temporary peak of 8 per cent in 1910 (52 per cent of foreigners at that time were German, 37 per cent Italian). The growth levelled off in the inter-war period. The proportion of foreigners fell to 3 per cent by 1941.

After the Second World War the economic boom triggered a veritable growth spurt, with average annual growth of 1.3% between 1950 and 2000. Growth was particularly strong in the districts of Baden, Bremgarten and Rheinfelden, which were catching up with the fast-growing conurbations of Zurich and Basel. An extreme example is Spreitenbach, where the population increased sixfold during this period. The district of Aarau also experienced strong growth.

It can be observed that approximately half of the population growth between 1950 and 1970 was due to the immigration of foreigners, predominantly Italians. The majority of foreign labourers were Catholic, and thus in 1970, the number of Catholics exceeded that of Protestants for the first time since the Reformation. The proportion of foreigners rose to 18 per cent. Following the increased emigration of foreigners between 1975 and 1978, caused by the recession, their numbers rose steadily once more. Since 1980, the proportion of Italians in the foreign population has been on a downward trajectory. Currently, the majority of immigrants originate from the Balkan states and Turkey.

In 2009 the population exceeded 600,000. During the period of rapid growth that occurred in the 1960s, spatial planners had assumed a population of 1.15 million in the year 2000. Various plans were put in place to steer this targeted growth in the right direction. Garden cities with several thousand inhabitants were planned at various locations. Spreitenbach, for instance, was projected to have 30,000 inhabitants upon completion (the actual population is just over 10,000). The most prominent urban development project was the proposed Aarolfingen, which envisioned a metropolis of approximately 350,000 inhabitants in the Aarau-Olten-Zofingen area. However, this project failed due to a lack of public support and the economic crisis of the 1970s.

Despite this rapid growth (the population increased by more than 200,000 in the second half of the 20th century), no real centre has yet developed. Compared with the rest of Switzerland, Aargau has an above-average number of municipalities. Only Aarau and Wettingen have more than 20,000 inhabitants. The lack of a strong centre means that even 200 years after the canton was founded, there is still a pronounced regionalism. The districts of Baden, Bremgarten and Zurzach are strongly oriented towards the canton of Zurich, and in many municipalities, the proportion of commuters from outside the canton exceeds 30 per cent. The district of Rheinfelden is increasingly oriented towards Basel, the district of Muri towards Zug and Lucerne, and the district of Zofingen towards Olten and Bern.

== Sources ==
=== General ===
- Gautschi, Willi (1978). Geschichte des Kantons Aargau 1885–1953 (in German). Vol. 3. Baden: Baden Verlag.
- Halder, Nold (1953). Geschichte des Kantons Aargau 1803–1830' (in German). Vol. 1. Baden: Baden Verlag.
- Hartmann, Martin; Weber, Hans (1985). Die Römer im Aargau (in German). Aarau: Verlag Sauerländer. ISBN 978-3-7941-2539-5.
- Krieger, Karl-Friedrich (2004). Die Habsburger im Mittelalter: von Rudolf I. bis Friedrich III. Urban-Taschenbücher (in German) (2nd ed.). Stuttgart: Kohlhammer. ISBN 978-3-17-018228-8.
- Meier, Bruno; Sauerländer, Dominik; Stauffacher, Hans Rudolf; Steigmeier, Andreas (1998). Meier, Bruno; Farrèr, Orlando (eds.). Revolution im Aargau: Umsturz, Aufbruch, Widerstand 1798 – 1803. Verein Forschungsprojekt Aargau 1798 (in German) (2nd ed.). Aarau: AT Verlag. ISBN 978-3-85502-612-8.
- Meier, Bruno (2008). Ein Königshaus aus der Schweiz: die Habsburger, der Aargau und die Eidgenossenschaft im Mittelalter (in German). Baden: Hier + Jetzt. ISBN 978-3-03919-069-0.
- Mittler, Otto (1962). Geschichte der Stadt Baden: Von der frühesten Zeit bis um 1650 (in German). Vol. 1. Aarau: Sauerländer.
- Mittler, Otto (1965). Geschichte der Stadt Baden: Von 1650 bis zur Gegenwart (in German). Vol. 2. Aarau: Sauerländer.
- Sauerländer, Dominik (2000). Villmergen – Eine Ortsgeschichte' (in German). Gemeinde Villmergen.
- Seiler, Christophe; Steigmeier, Andreas (1998). Geschichte des Aargaus: Illustrierter Überblick von der Urzeit bis zur Gegenwart (in German) (2nd ed.). Aarau: AT-Verl. ISBN 978-3-85502-410-0.
- Staehelin, Heinrich (1978). Geschichte des Kantons Aargau 1830–1885 (in German). Vol. 2. Baden: Baden Verlag.
- Wägli, Hans G. (1998). Schienennetz Schweiz: ein technisch-historischer Atlas (in German) (2nd ed.). Zürich: AS-Verl. ISBN 978-3-905111-21-7.

=== Beiträge zur Aargauergeschichte ===
The Historische Gesellschaft des Kantons Aargau (HGA) has published a series of monographs dedicated to individual events or topics in Aargau's history. Beginning in 1978, the Contributions to Aargau history appear at irregular intervals.

- Bickel, August (1978). Die Herren von Hallwil. Beitrag zur schwäbisch-schweizerischen Adelsgeschichte. Beiträge zur Aargauergeschichte (in German). Vol. 0. Aarau: Sauerländer.
- Pfister, Willy (1980). Aargauer in fremden Kriegsdiensten. Die Aargauer im bernischen Regiment und in der Garde in Frankreich 1701 – 1792. Die Aargauer im bernischen Regiment in Sardinien 1737 – 1799. Beiträge zur Aargauergeschichte (in German). Vol. 1. Aarau: Sauerländer.
- Pfister, Willy (1984). Aargauer in fremden Kriegsdiensten. Die bernischen Regimenter und Gardekompanien in den Niederlanden 1701 – 1796. Beiträge zur Aargauergeschichte (in German). Vol. 2. Aarau: Sauerländer.
- Holstein, August Guido (1982). Das Freiamt im aargauischen Staate 1803 – 1830. Beiträge zur Aargauergeschichte (in German). Vol. 3. Aarau: Sauerländer.
- Jehle, Fridolin; Enderle-Jehle, Adelheid (1993). Die Geschichte des Stiftes Säckingen. Beiträge zur Aargauergeschichte (in German). Vol. 4. Aarau: Sauerländer.
- Pfister, Willy (1993). Die Gefangenen und Hingerichteten im bernischen Aargau. Die Justiz des 16. bis 18. Jahrhunderts. Beiträge zur Aargauergeschichte (in German). Vol. 5. Aarau: Sauerländer.
- Meier, Bruno; Sauerländer, Dominik (1995). Das Surbtal im Spätmittelalter. Kulturlandschaft und Gesellschaft einer ländlichen Region (1250–1550) [The Surbtal in the late Middle Ages. Cultural landscape and society in a rural region (1250–1550)]. Beiträge zur Aargauergeschichte (in German). Vol. 6. Aarau: Sauerländer.
- Steiner, Peter (1998). Der Bezirk Kulm zur Zeit der Helvetik. Beiträge zur Aargauergeschichte (in German). Vol. 7. Aarau: Sauerländer.
- Blank, Stefan; Hug, Regula; Noseda, Irma; Rauschert, Jeannette; Sauerländer, Dominik (1998). Stadt im Aufbruch – Aarau um 1798. Notbehelfe, Neubauten und ein städtebaulicher Entwurf für die erste Hauptstadt der Schweiz. Beiträge zur Aargauergeschichte (in German). Vol. 8. Aarau: Sauerländer.
- Müller, Andreas (1998). Geschichte der politischen Presse im Aargau. Das 19. Jahrhundert. Beiträge zur Aargauergeschichte (in German). Vol. 9. Aarau: Sauerländer.
- Fuchs, Matthias (2001). «Dies Buch ist mein Acker.» Der Kanton Aargau und seine Volksschullesebücher im 19. Jahrhundert. Beiträge zur Aargauergeschichte (in German). Vol. 10. Aarau: Sauerländer.
- Müller, Andreas (2002). Geschichte der politischen Presse im Aargau. Das 20. Jahrhundert. Beiträge zur Aargauergeschichte (in German). Vol. 11. Aarau: Sauerländer.
- Ort, Werner (2003). Der modernen Schweiz entgegen. Heinrich Zschokke prägt den Aargau. Beiträge zur Aargauergeschichte (in German). Vol. 12. Baden: Hier + Jetzt.
- Rohr, Adolf (2005). Philipp Albert Stapfer. Minister der Helvetischen Republik und Gesandter der Schweiz in Paris 1798 – 1803. Beiträge zur Aargauergeschichte (in German). Vol. 13. Baden: Hier + Jetzt.
- Leimgruber, Yvonne; Frank, Hansjörg; Fuchs, Matthias; Küng, Beatrice (2005). Pädagoge – Politiker – Kirchenreformer. Augustin Keller (1805–1883) und seine Zeit. Beiträge zur Aargauergeschichte (in German). Vol. 14. Baden: Hier + Jetzt.
- Wicki, Dieter (2006). Der aargauische Grosse Rat 1803 – 2003. Wandel eines Kantonsparlamentes – eine Kollektivbiografie. Beiträge zur Aargauergeschichte (in German). Vol. 15. Baden: Hier + Jetzt.
- Steiner, Peter (2009). Aargauer in der Pfalz. Die Auswanderung aus dem Berner Aargau nach dem Dreissigjährigen Krieg. Beiträge zur Aargauergeschichte (in German). Vol. 16. Baden: Hier + Jetzt.
- Schmid, Barbara, ed. (2014). Das Diarium des Badener Friedens von 1714 von Caspar Joseph Dorer: Mit Einleitung und Kommentar herausgegeben von Barbara Schmid. Beiträge zur Aargauer Geschichte (in German). Vol. 18. Baden: Hier und Jetzt.
