= Dättwil =

Village in Switzerland

Dättwil is a village in the canton of Aargau in Switzerland. It is located on a lateral moraine between the Reuss Valley and the western slope of the Heiterberg. From 1804 onwards, Dättwil formed an independent municipality with the three exclaves of Münzlishausen, Rütihof, and Segelhof. Since 1962, Dättwil has been part of the town of Baden. In 2017, the village had a population of just under 3,500 and hosted numerous industrial and commercial enterprises. Recent decades have seen significant construction activity in Dättwil. The village should not be confused with the homophonous district of Dätwil in the municipality of Andelfingen in the canton of Zurich.

== History ==
The area around Dättwil was likely inhabited during the Bronze Age, as evidenced by an axe found during excavations in 1924. Around the 9th century, Alemannic settlers cleared the forest and established settlements. The first documented mention of Tetwiler was in 924. Comprising four farms, the village served as a court of law from the 12th century onwards. Criminal jurisdiction was held by successive rulers: initially the Counts of Lenzburg, from 1173 the Counts of Kyburg, and from 1273 the Habsburgs.

In 1351, Zurich troops marched through eastern Aargau. Their attempt to capture the town of Baden failed, but they burned the baths and plundered surrounding villages. In the Battle of Dättwil, they fought back against Habsburg troops and secured their loot. In 1415, the Confederates conquered Aargau, and Dättwil became part of the County of Baden, a common dominion. The county's gallows stood near the village. The Meier of Dättwil also governed farmers in Rütihof and Münzlishausen, who were not part of any village community. The forest around Dättwil was owned exclusively by the town of Baden.

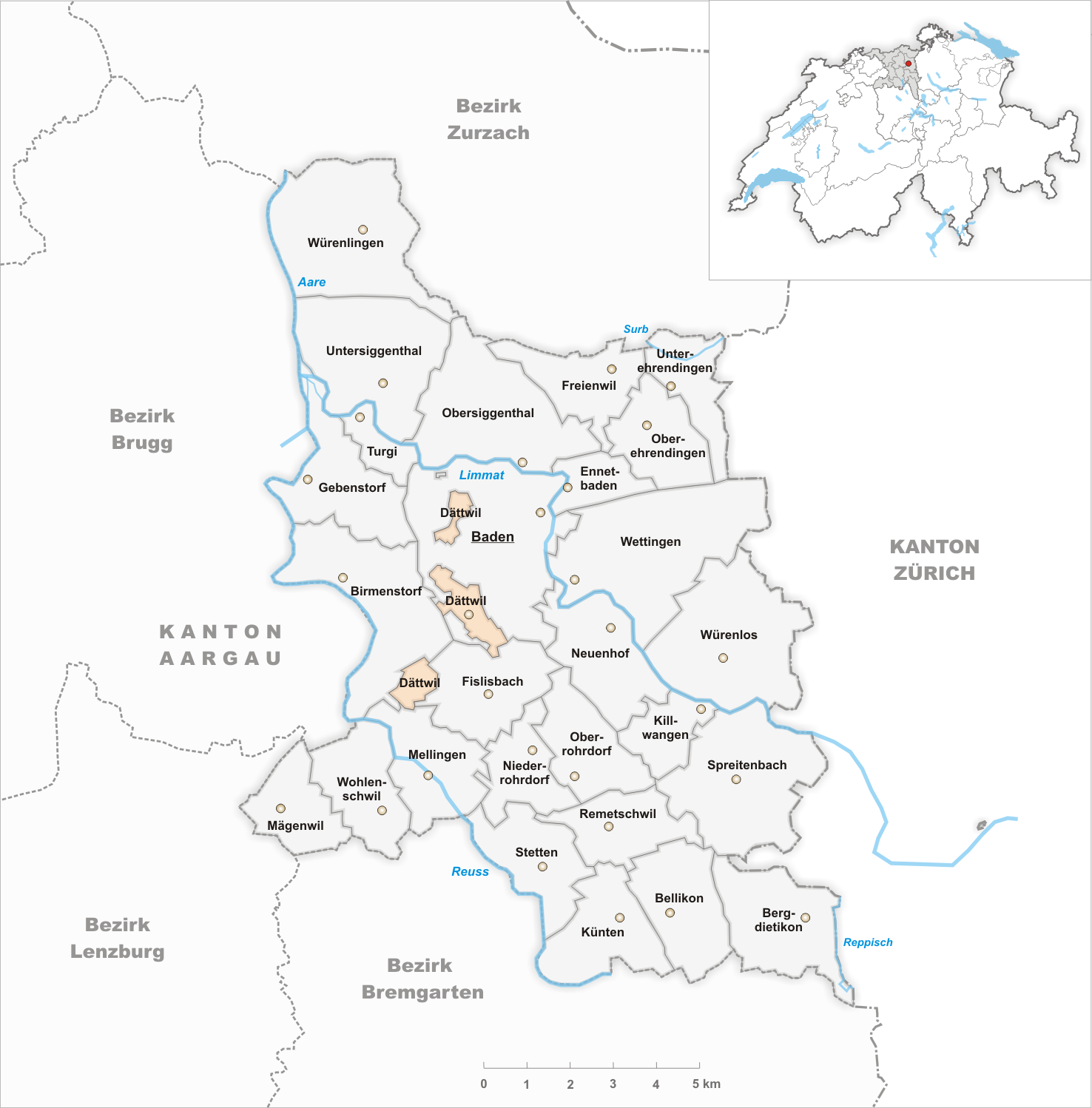
Municipal status prior to the merger on 1 January 1962

In 1740, two Reformed farming families settled in Dättwil, which remained Catholic. They formed the beginnings of the Reformed Church of Baden, as Reformed Protestants were not allowed to settle freely in Baden until 1798, despite the existence of a Reformed church building since 1714. On 17 May 1798, the authorities of the Helvetic Republic, established by France, created the municipality of Dättwil from Dättwil, Rütihof, Segelhof, and Münzlishausen, forming four unconnected areas.

After the Mediation Act took effect, local councils were required to be elected in all Aargau municipalities in August 1803. In Dättwil, no election occurred due to disputes among the localities, which sought union with Baden. After several failed mediation attempts, on 12 September 1804, the Small Council ordered the merger of Dättwil and the three exclaves into an independent municipality. The hamlet of Muntwil and the Eschenbach farm were mistakenly included, despite belonging to Birmenstorf; this error was corrected in early 1805. Following significant pressure from the Small Council, Dättwil elected its first municipal council on 9 December 1805. In the following decades, the fragmented municipality grew slowly, with the opening of the Swiss National Railway line in 1877 having little impact. In 1805, the population was 229; by 1960, it had risen to 604, with slightly more than half living in Rütihof.

From the 1940s, efforts were made to incorporate Dättwil into the Canton of Baden. In 1959, the Baden City Council was tasked by the municipal assembly with drafting a merger agreement. The municipal assembly of Baden approved the agreement by a clear majority, while in Dättwil, the overall vote was 96 to 32 in favour. However, approval varied: Münzlishausen and Rütihof had almost no dissenting votes, but a narrow majority in the largest district, Dättwil, opposed the merger and was outvoted. After formal confirmation by the Grand Council, the merger took effect on 1 January 1962.

The motivation for the merger, particularly for Baden, was the potential for construction and development. Subsequent growth occurred almost exclusively in the incorporated districts. In 1967, the research centre of the former Brown, Boveri & Cie was established in Segelhof, and in 1978, the cantonal hospital was built in Dättwil. Benefiting from the 1970 motorway opening, new residential areas were developed, and the population multiplied.

== Economy ==
The largest employer is the Hospital of the Canton of Baden. Dättwil hosts the extensive Täfern industrial and commercial zone, which, alongside the town centre three kilometres to the north-east, forms one of Baden's two economic hubs. Companies include the Swiss branch of Brother. Segelhof is home to the research centre of the electrical engineering group ABB.

== Traffic ==
Dättwil is located at the western entrance to the Baregg Tunnel and has been connected to the A1 motorway between Zurich and Bern via the Baden West junction since 1970. Main roads from Baden to Lenzburg and Bremgarten pass through the village. These transport links and proximity to Zurich have driven Dättwil's growth since the 1970s.

The village is served by several bus routes: lines 6 and 7 of the RVBW connect Dättwil with Baden, Birmenstorf, and Rütihof. PostBus routes run from Baden railway station to Bremgarten (via Stetten and Mellingen), Mägenwil, and Berikon-Widen. A night bus operates on weekends from Baden via Dättwil and Mellingen to Bremgarten. From 1877 to 2004, Dättwil had a station on the Zofingen–Wettingen railway line; passenger services were discontinued, and freight transport is now sporadic.

== Notable people ==
- Robert Obrist (1937–2018), architect.
- Salvatore Mainardi (born 1954), painter and graphic artist, lives in Dättwil.
