= Pierre Stutz =

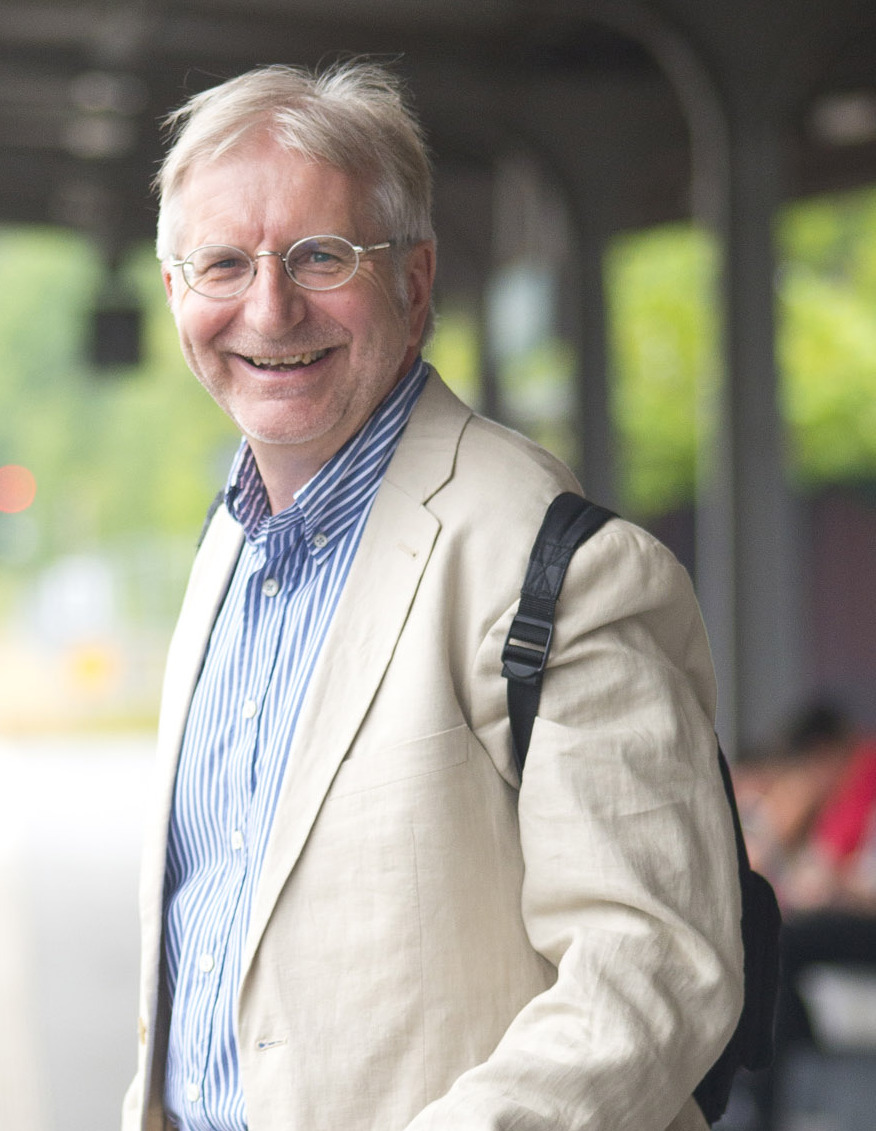
Stutz, 2013

Pierre Stutz (Hägglingen, Aargau, 7 November 1953) is a Swiss writer and theologian.

== Life ==
As the fourth and youngest child, he went to La Salle in Neuchâtel after school (1968–1969), he then attended middle school and in 1974, he joined the Catholic men's order De La Salle Brothers, that he quit in 1978 to study theology in Lucern, and he was ordained a priest at the Diocese of Basel in 1985.

From 1985 to 1988, Stutz worked as a youth pastor in Fricktal, Zurich and Lucern.

In 1992, a personal crisis led him back to Neuchâtel, to the Abbaye de Fontaine-André, where he founded an “open momastery” with other people. In 2002, Stutz resigned from his priesthood.

Since 2003, he has been together with his partner Harald Weß. They are married and live in Osnabrück.

== Works ==
- Gott sucht nicht immerzu Himmlisches in dir. Briefe an bekannte Mystiker, 2009
- Alltagsrituale. Wege zur inneren Quelle, 2011
- Deine Küsse verzaubern mich. Liebe und Leidenschaft als spirituelle Quellen, 2012
- Ein Stück Himmel im Alltag. Sieben Schritte zu mehr Lebendigkeit, 2013
- Atempausen für die Seele, 2013
- Verwundet bin ich und aufgehoben. Für eine Spiritualität der Unvollkommenheit. 2014
- In der Weite des Himmels. Ein meditativer Gang durch die Bibel, 2014
- Geh hinein in deine Kraft. 50 Film-Momente fürs Leben, 2015
- Vom Leben berührt. Achtsame Impulse für jeden Tag, 2016
- Die spirituelle Weisheit der Bäume. Eine Entdeckungsreise, 2017
- Lass dich nicht im Stich. Die spirituelle Botschaft von Ärger, Zorn und Wut,2017
- Geborgen und frei. Mystik als Lebensstil, 2018
- 50 Rituale für die Seele, 2018
- Menschlichkeit JETZT!, 2021
- Engel des Trostes wünsche ich dir. Kraft in Zeiten der Trauer, 2022
- Suchend bleibe ich ein Leben lang. 150 Meditationen, 2022
- Wie ich der wurde, den ich mag, 2023
