= Dottikon =

- Municipality
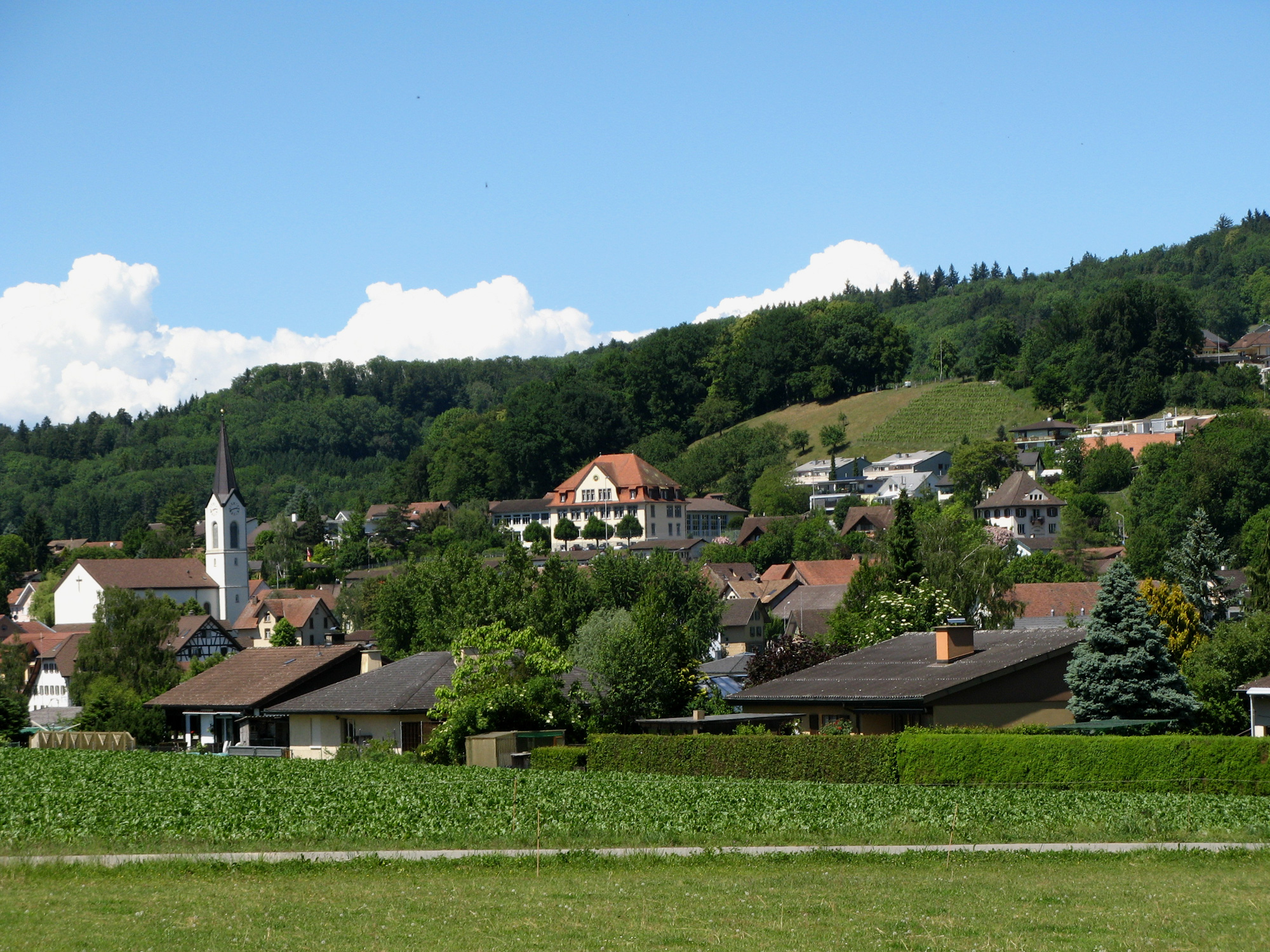

- Flag Coat of arms
- Location of Dottikon
- Location within Switzerland Location within Canton of Aargau
- Coordinates: 47°23′N 8°14′E
- Country: Switzerland
- Canton: Aargau
- District: Bremgarten

Area
  - Total: 3.89 km^{2} (1.50 sq mi)
- Elevation: 424 m (1,391 ft)

Population (December 2020)
  - Total: 3,932
  - Density: 1,010/km^{2} (2,620/sq mi)
- Time zone: UTC+01:00 (CET)
  - Summer (DST): UTC+02:00 (CEST)
- Postal code: 5605
- SFOS number: 4065
- ISO 3166 code: CH-AG
- Surrounded by: Hägglingen, Hendschiken, Othmarsingen, Villmergen, Wohlen
- Website: www.dottikon.ch

Dottikon is a municipality in the district of Bremgarten in the canton of Aargau in Switzerland.

Aerial view (1970)

== History ==
Dottikon is first mentioned in 1179 as Totinchon.

== Geography ==
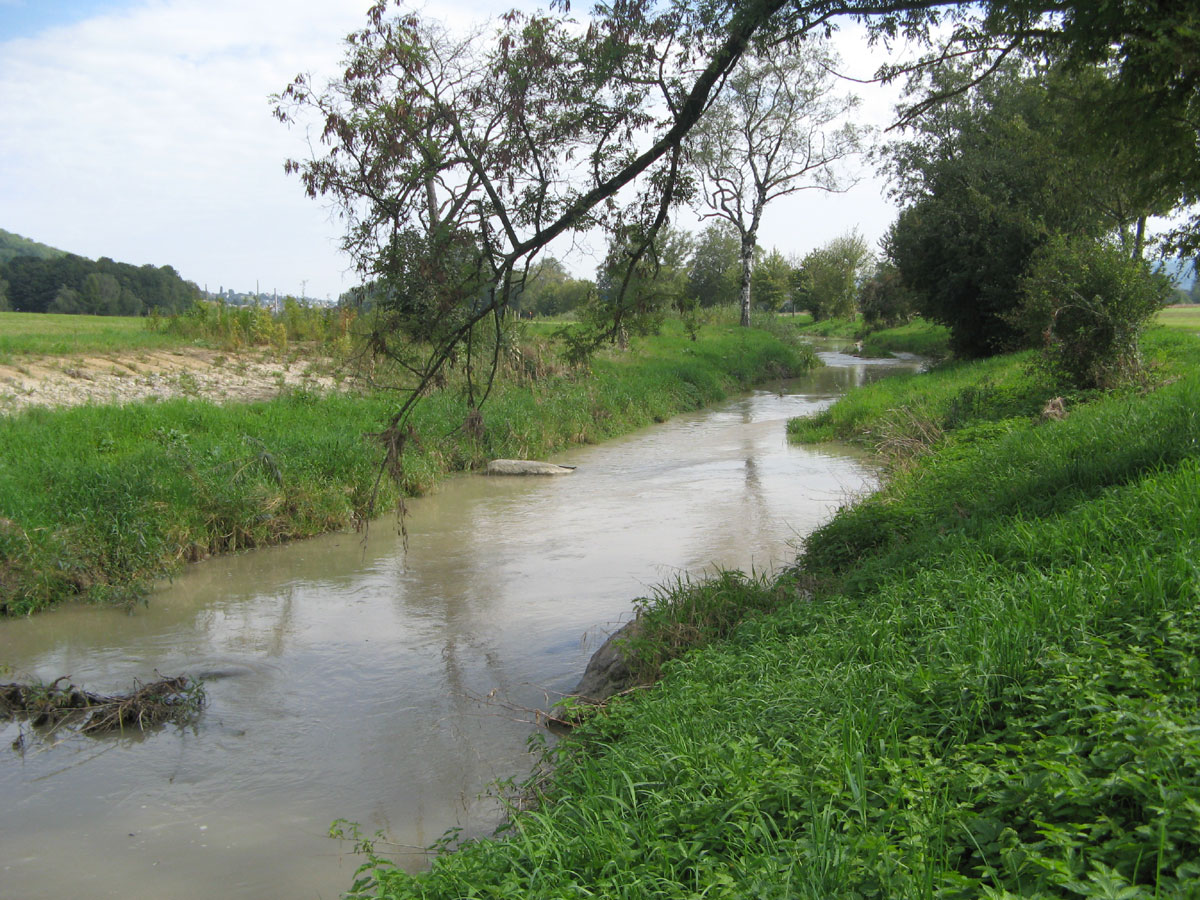
Bünz stream

Dottikon has an area, as of 2006, of 3.9 square kilometers (1.5 sq mi). Of this area, 47.5% is used for agricultural purposes, while 22.7% is forested. Of the rest of the land, 28.9% is settled (buildings or roads) and the remainder (0.8%) is non-productive (rivers or lakes).

The municipality is located in the Bremgarten district on the edge of the Bünz stream. It consists of the linear village of Dottikon.

== Coat of arms ==
The blazon of the municipal coat of arms is Or a Semi Horse rampant Gules issuant from Coupeaux Vert.

== Demographics ==
Dottikon has a population (as of 31 December 2020) of 3,932. As of 2008, 33.6% of the population was made up of foreign nationals. Over the last 10 years the population has grown at a rate of 1.1%. Most of the population (as of 2000) speaks German (78.1%), with Italian being second most common ( 9.3%) and Turkish being third ( 2.9%).

The age distribution, as of 2008, in Dottikon is; 307 children or 9.8% of the population are between 0 and 9 years old and 351 teenagers or 11.2% are between 10 and 19. Of the adult population, 440 people or 14.0% of the population are between 20 and 29 years old. 448 people or 14.3% are between 30 and 39, 533 people or 17.0% are between 40 and 49, and 425 people or 13.6% are between 50 and 59. The senior population distribution is 341 people or 10.9% of the population are between 60 and 69 years old, 189 people or 6.0% are between 70 and 79, there are 82 people or 2.6% who are between 80 and 89, and there are 20 people or 0.6% who are 90 and older.

As of 2000 the average number of residents per living room was 0.59 which is about equal to the cantonal average of 0.57 per room. In this case, a room is defined as space of a housing unit of at least 4 m^{2} (43 sq ft) as normal bedrooms, dining rooms, living rooms, kitchens and habitable cellars and attics. About 44.6% of the total households were owner occupied, or in other words did not pay rent (though they may have a mortgage or a rent-to-own agreement). As of 2000, there were 111 homes with 1 or 2 persons in the household, 657 homes with 3 or 4 persons in the household, and 380 homes with 5 or more persons in the household. The average number of people per household was 2.46 individuals. In 2008 there were 464 single family homes (or 34.2% of the total) out of a total of 1,357 homes and apartments. There were a total of 19 empty apartments for a 1.4% vacancy rate. As of 2007, the construction rate of new housing units was 4.2 new units per 1000 residents.

In the 2007 federal election the most popular party was the SVP which received 35.1% of the vote. The next three most popular parties were the CVP (18.8%), the SP (17.2%) and the FDP (13.4%).

The entire Swiss population is generally well educated. In Dottikon about 60.5% of the population (between age 25-64) have completed either non-mandatory upper secondary education or additional higher education (either university or a Fachhochschule). Of the school age population (in the 2008/2009 school year), there are 278 students attending primary school, there are 111 students attending secondary school, there are 160 students attending tertiary or university level schooling in the municipality.

The historical population is given in the following table:

Historical population
Year	Pop.	±%
1850	713	—
1900	722	+1.3%
1950	1,321	+83.0%
1970	2,462	+86.4%
1990	2,955	+20.0%
2000	2,969	+0.5%

== Economy ==
As of 2007, Dottikon had an unemployment rate of 3.22%. As of 2005, there were 48 people employed in the primary economic sector and about 9 businesses involved in this sector. 678 people are employed in the secondary sector and there are 37 businesses in this sector. 381 people are employed in the tertiary sector, with 86 businesses in this sector.

As of 2000 there were 1,651 total workers who lived in the municipality. Of these, 1,259 or about 76.3% of the residents worked outside Dottikon while 754 people commuted into the municipality for work. There were a total of 1,146 jobs (of at least 6 hours per week) in the municipality. Of the working population, 10.6% used public transportation to get to work, and 57.4% used a private car.

== Transport ==
Dottikon shares a railway station with Dintikon. The station is located on the Aargau Southern Railway line and is served by services of the Aargau S-Bahn and the S42 of the Zurich S-Bahn, which is a rush-hour service.

== Religion ==
From the 2000 census, 1,545 or 52.0% were Roman Catholic, while 628 or 21.2% belonged to the Swiss Reformed Church. Of the rest of the population, there were 2 individuals (or about 0.07% of the population) who belonged to the Christian Catholic faith.
