= Tägerig =

- Municipality
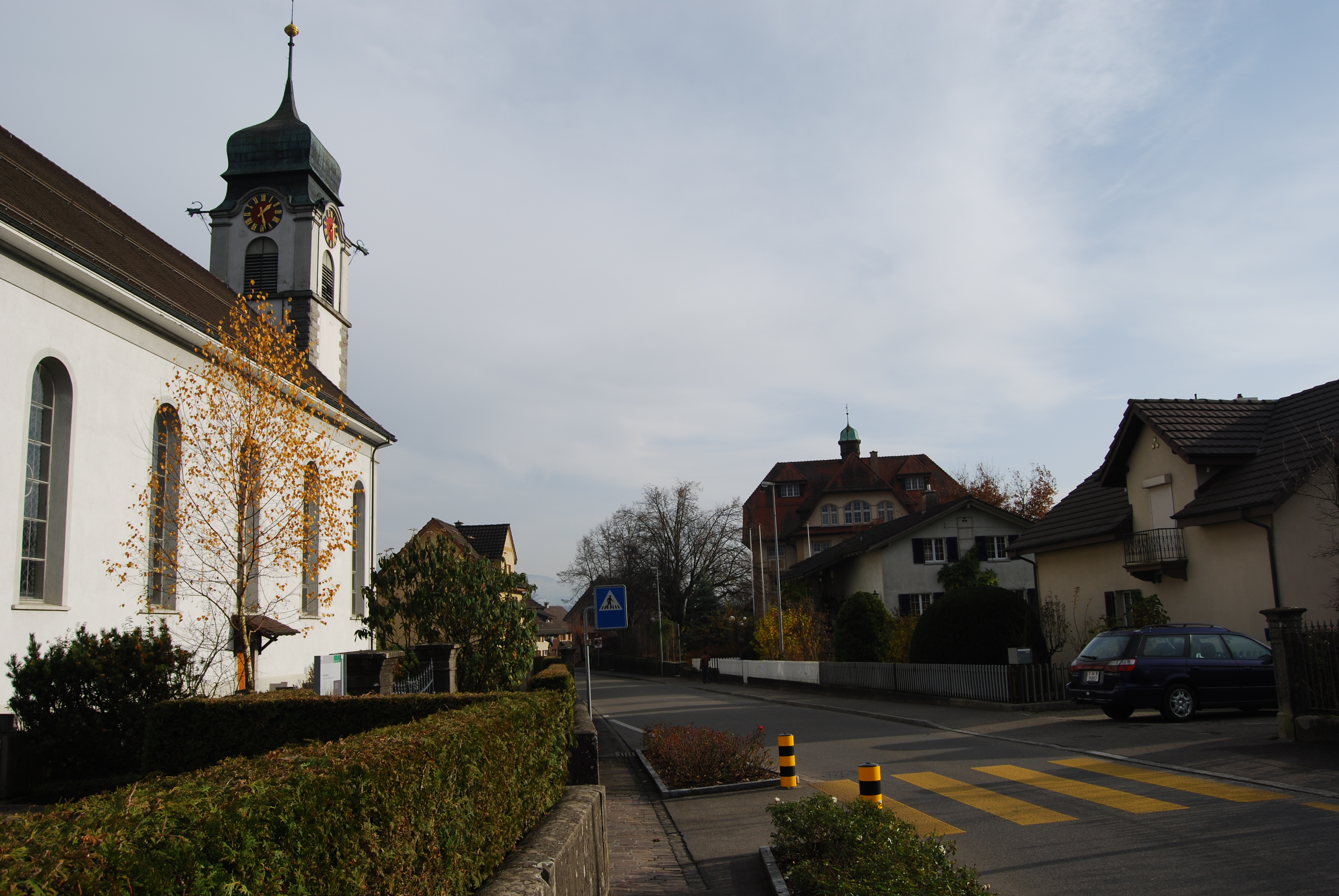
- Tägerig village

- Flag Coat of arms
- Location of Tägerig
- Location within Switzerland Location within Canton of Aargau
- Coordinates: 47°24′N 8°17′E
- Country: Switzerland
- Canton: Aargau
- District: Bremgarten

Area
  - Total: 3.30 km^{2} (1.27 sq mi)
- Elevation: 396 m (1,299 ft)

Population (December 2020)
  - Total: 1,470
  - Density: 445/km^{2} (1,150/sq mi)
- Time zone: UTC+01:00 (CET)
  - Summer (DST): UTC+02:00 (CEST)
- Postal code: 5522
- SFOS number: 4077
- ISO 3166 code: CH-AG
- Surrounded by: Hägglingen, Mellingen, Niederwil, Stetten, Wohlenschwil
- Website: taegerig.ch

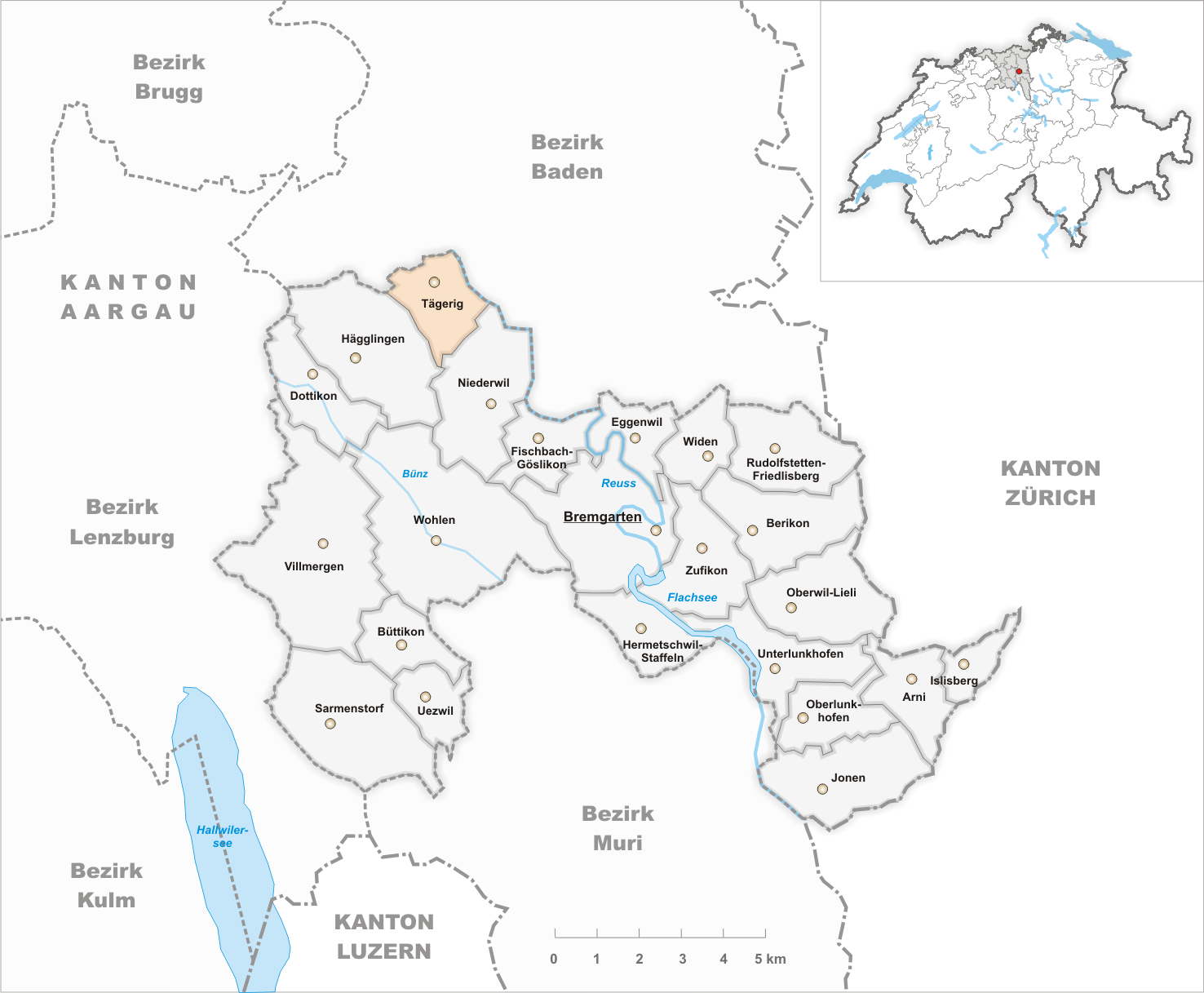
Tägerig

Tägerig is a municipality in the district of Bremgarten in the canton of Aargau in Switzerland.

== History ==
Aerial view (1955)

A number of shaped flints have been found north of the modern village, indicating that the area was inhabited before written records. The first mention of the modern village is in the 12th century when it was mentioned as Tegrank. In 1189 it was mentioned as Tegeranc.

The Twingherrschaft region (which included Tägerig) was a Habsburg fief in the 14th century, and was granted to the Knights of Rüssegg. In 1350 it went to the Freiherren of Wohlen, then in 1409 to Segesser of Brunegg and in 1543 to the City of Mellingen.

Tägerig initially belonged to the parish church of Niederwil. In 1669 a branch chapel was dedicated. After the devastating fire of 1838, a new church was built in 1846 and was made in 1864 into a separate parish.

Besides agriculture, in the 18th century the straw plaiting industry was of major importance in the village. As this industry declined in the late 19th and early 20th century, the population declined. By the 1920s much of the population commuted to jobs in Mellingen and Baden (in 1990, 76% of the working population commuted). For this reason, population growth remained moderate even after 1950.

== Geography ==
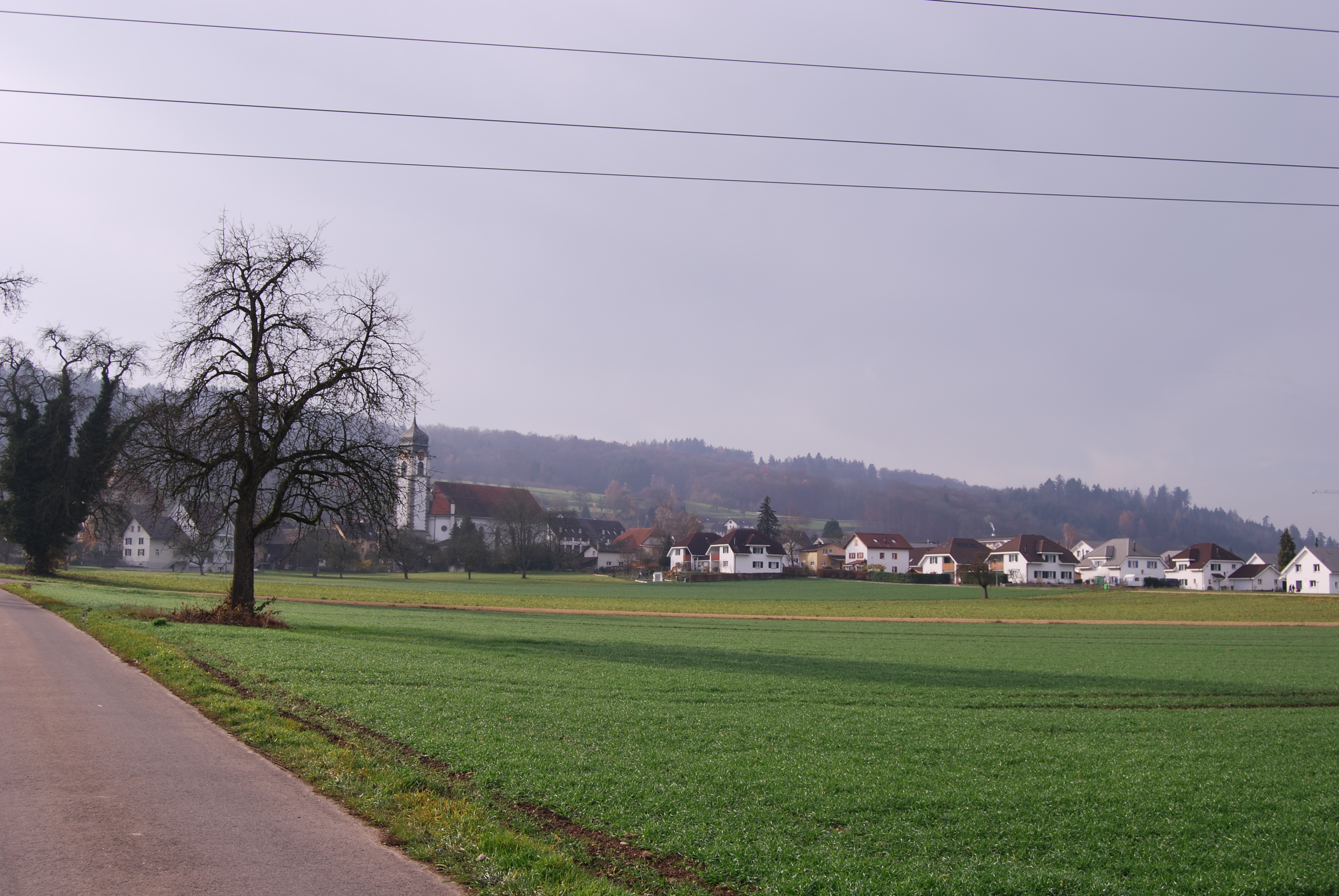
Tägerig

Tägerig has an area, as of 2006, of 3.3 square kilometers (1.3 sq mi). Of this area, 42.9% is used for agricultural purposes, while 39.2% is forested. Of the rest of the land, 15.5% is settled (buildings or roads) and the remainder (2.4%) is non-productive (rivers or lakes).

The municipality is located in the Bremgarten district in the Reuss river valley. It consists of the village of Tägerig on the valley floor and the hamlets of Büschikon in the surrounding hills.

== Coat of arms ==
The blazon of the municipal coat of arms is Azure two Keys Argent in saltire and in chief a Mullet of Five Or.

== Demographics ==
Tägerig has a population (as of 31 December 2020) of 1,470. As of 2008, 13.1% of the population was made up of foreign nationals. Over the last 10 years (1997–2007) the population has changed at a rate of 17.8%. Most of the population (as of 2000) speaks German (92.6%), with Albanian being second most common ( 2.3%) and Serbo-Croatian being third ( 1.0%).

The age distribution, as of 2008, in Tägerig is; 185 children or 13.6% of the population are between 0 and 9 years old and 136 teenagers or 10.0% are between 10 and 19. Of the adult population, 173 people or 12.7% of the population are between 20 and 29 years old. 198 people or 14.6% are between 30 and 39, 235 people or 17.3% are between 40 and 49, and 192 people or 14.1% are between 50 and 59. The senior population distribution is 126 people or 9.3% of the population are between 60 and 69 years old, 82 people or 6.0% are between 70 and 79, there are 29 people or 2.1% who are between 80 and 89, and there are 3 people or 0.2% who are 90 and older.

As of 2000, there were 21 homes with 1 or 2 persons in the household, 221 homes with 3 or 4 persons in the household, and 196 homes with 5 or more persons in the household. The average number of people per household was 2.51 individuals. In 2008 there were 287 single family homes (or 54.5% of the total) out of a total of 527 homes and apartments. There were a total of 4 empty apartments for a 0.8% vacancy rate. As of 2007, the construction rate of new housing units was 5.2 new units per 1000 residents.

In the 2007 federal election the most popular party was the SVP which received 42.1% of the vote. The next three most popular parties were the CVP (16.9%), the SP (15.6%) and the FDP (6.9%).

In Tägerig about 74.2% of the population (between age 25 and 64) have completed either non-mandatory upper secondary education or additional higher education (either university or a Fachhochschule). Of the school age population (in the 2008/2009 school year), there are 132 students attending primary school in the municipality.

The historical population is given in the following table:

Historical population
Year	Pop.	±%
1803	517	—
1850	990	+91.5%
1900	606	−38.8%
1950	726	+19.8%
1990	1,061	+46.1%

== Economy ==
As of 2007, Tägerig had an unemployment rate of 2.25%. As of 2005, there were 28 people employed in the primary economic sector and about 8 businesses involved in this sector. 51 people are employed in the secondary sector and there are 17 businesses in this sector. 116 people are employed in the tertiary sector, with 27 businesses in this sector.

As of 2000 there were 668 residents who worked in the municipality, while 536 residents worked outside Tägerig and 55 people commuted into the municipality for work. Of the working population, 14% used public transportation to get to work, and 55.5% used a private car.

== Religion ==
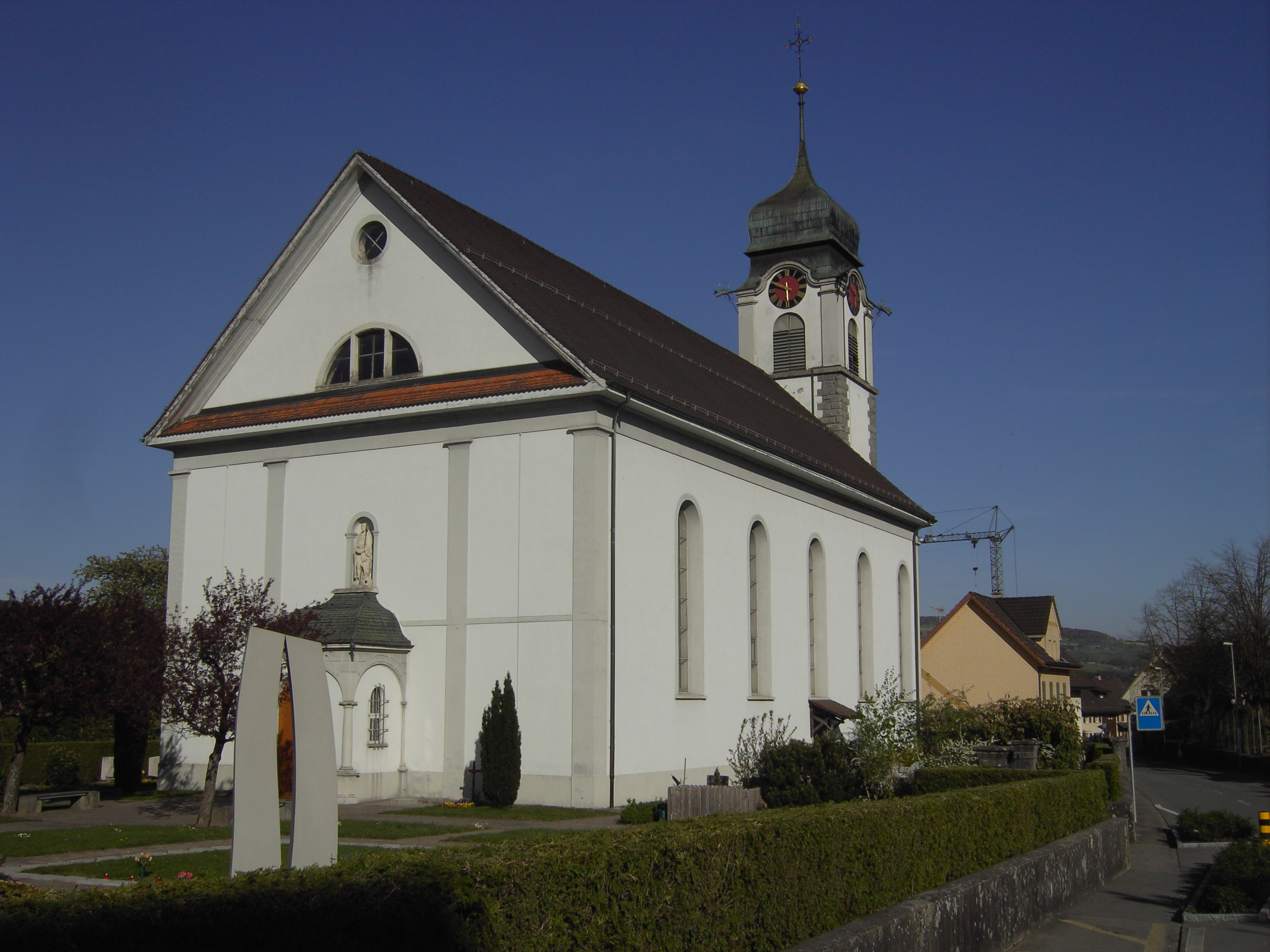
Roman Catholic Church Tägerig

From the 2000 census, 637 or 53.4% were Roman Catholic, while 328 or 27.5% belonged to the Swiss Reformed Church.
