= Birrhard =

- Municipality
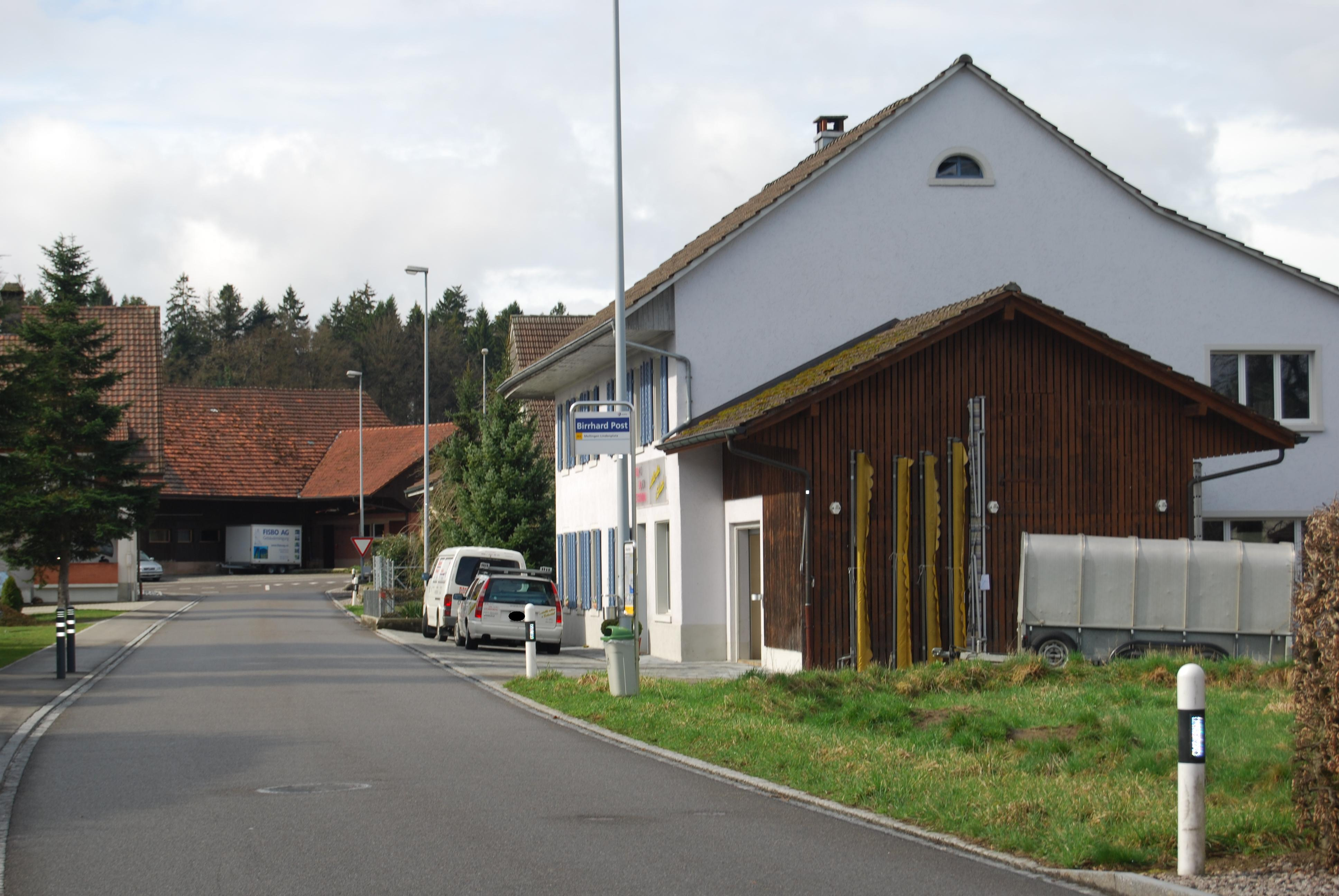

- Flag Coat of arms
- Location of Birrhard
- Location within Switzerland Location within Canton of Aargau
- Coordinates: 47°26′N 8°15′E
- Country: Switzerland
- Canton: Aargau
- District: Brugg

Area
  - Total: 2.99 km^{2} (1.15 sq mi)
- Elevation: 390 m (1,280 ft)

Population (December 2020)
  - Total: 16,881
  - Density: 5,650/km^{2} (14,600/sq mi)
- Time zone: UTC+01:00 (CET)
  - Summer (DST): UTC+02:00 (CEST)
- Postal code: 5244
- SFOS number: 4093
- ISO 3166 code: CH-AG
- Surrounded by: Birmenstorf, Birr, Brunegg, Lupfig, Mägenwil, Mülligen, Wohlenschwil
- Website: birrhard.ch

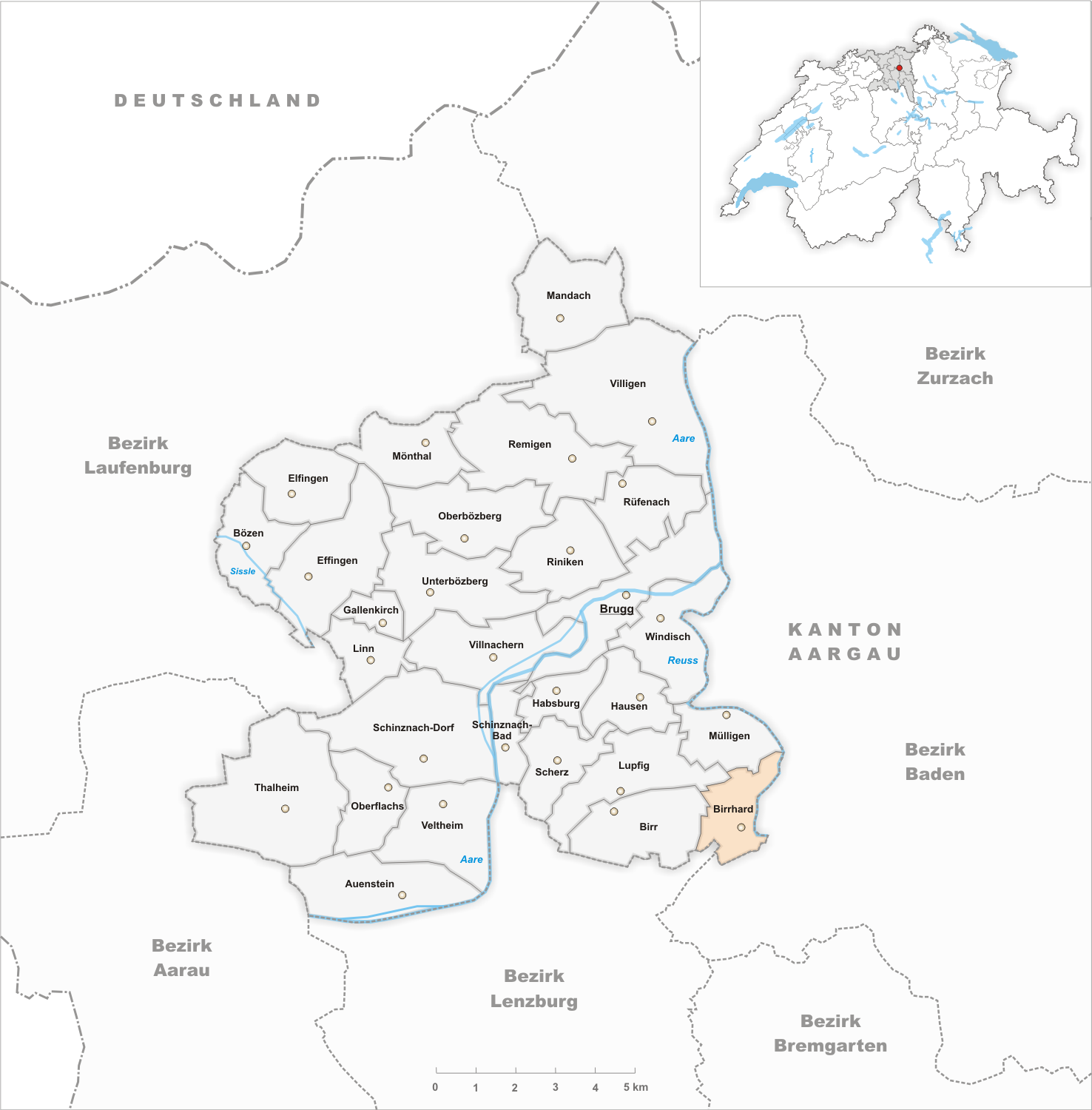
Birrhard

Birrhard is a municipality in the district of Brugg in canton of Aargau in Switzerland.

It is located about 5 km (3.1 mi) south east of the town of Brugg.

== History ==
Birrhard is first mentioned in 1254 as Birharth when it belonged to the Habsburgs. The authority over the village went to the monastery Königsfelden in Windisch in 1397. After the secularization of the monastery in 1528, the authority went to Bern.

== Geography ==
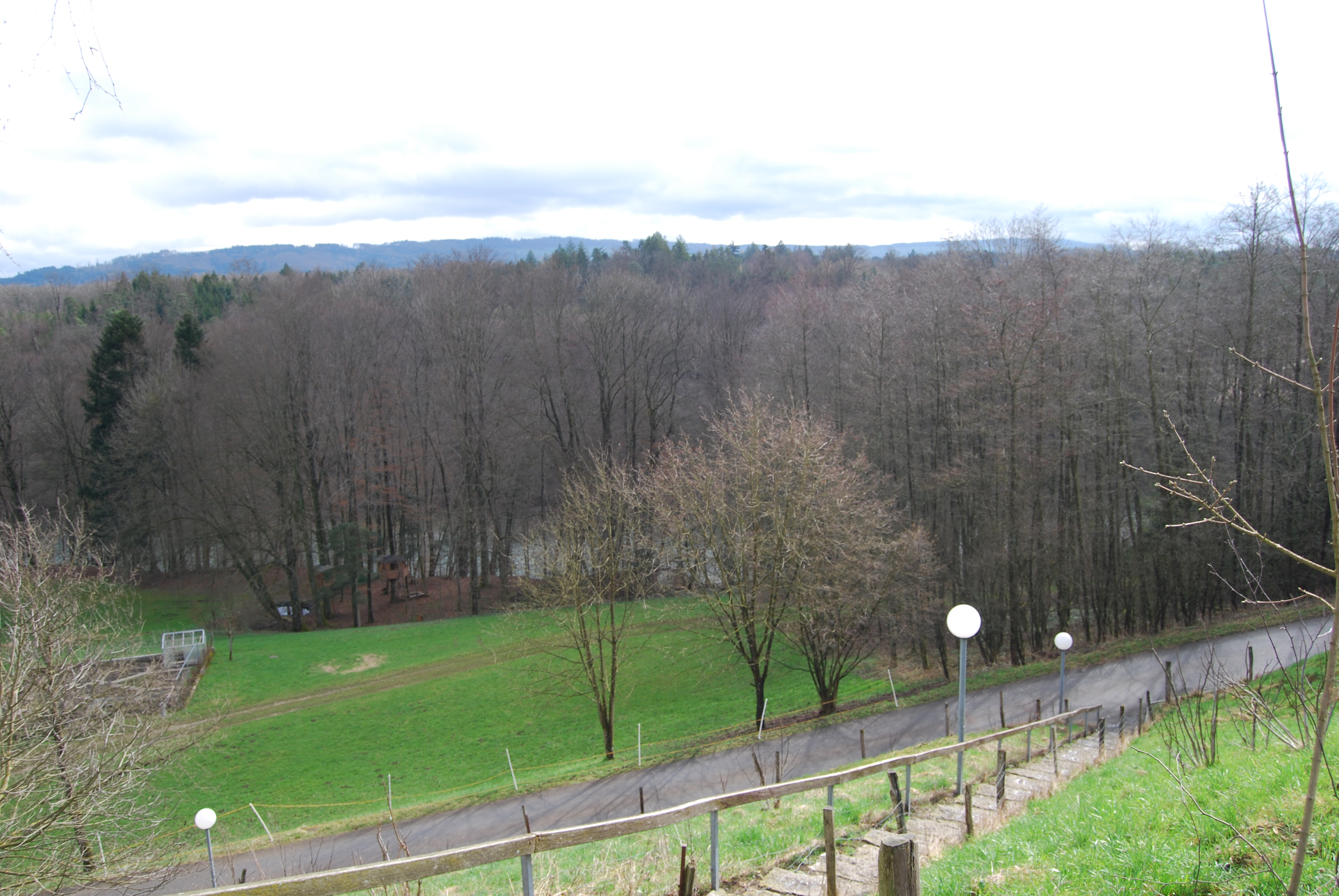
Reuss river at Birrhard

Aerial view (1954)

Birrhard has an area, as of 2007, of 2.99 square kilometers (1.15 sq mi). Of this area, 1.58 square kilometers (0.61 sq mi) or 52.8% is used for agricultural purposes, while1.01 square kilometers (0.39 sq mi) or 33.8% is forested. Of the rest of the land, 0.37 square kilometers (0.14 sq mi) or 12.4% is settled (buildings or roads), 0.05 km^{2} (12 acres) or 1.7% is either rivers or lakes. Of the built up area, industrial buildings made up 0.7% of the total area while housing and buildings made up 6.0% and transportation infrastructure made up 4.7%.. 32.8% of the total land area was heavily forested. Of the agricultural land, 46.2% is used for growing crops and 5.7% is pastures. All the water in the municipality is in rivers and streams.

The municipality is made up of the communities of Ausserdorf, Unterdorf (both part of the linear village of Birrhard) and the hamlets of Inlauf. It is located on the eastern edge of the expansive and mainly agriculture Birrfeld region. Just to the east of the town the plain drops about 50 meters (160 ft) to the banks of the Reuss river. The Reuss forms the eastern boundary of the municipality, and, in this area, flows through a valley about 100 meters (330 ft) wide. The highest point has an elevation of 412 meters (1,352 ft), and the lowest elevation, along the Reuss, is 340 meters (1,120 ft).

Neighboring municipalities are Mülligen to the north, Birmenstorf to the east, Wohlenschwil and Mägenwil to the south, Brunegg to the south-east and Birr and Lupfig to the west.

The municipalities of Birr and Birrhard are considering a merger on 1 January 2014 into a new municipality which will be known as Birr.

== Coat of arms ==
The blazon of the municipal coat of arms is Gules a Pear Tree eradicated Vert fructed Or and in Base wavy Argent fimbriated and with two fillets wavy Sable. This may be an example of canting as the German word for pear tree (German: Birnbaum) is similar to Birrhard.

== Demographics ==
Birrhard has a population (as of December 2020) of 742. As of June 2009, 9.6% of the population are foreign nationals. Over the last 10 years (1997–2007) the population has changed at a rate of 1.3%. Most of the population (as of 2000) speaks German (95.0%), with Italian being second most common ( 1.3%) and Albanian being third ( 1.0%).

The age distribution, as of 2008, in Birrhard is; 63 children or 9.7% of the population are between 0 and 9 years old and 83 teenagers or 12.7% are between 10 and 19. Of the adult population, 72 people or 11.0% of the population are between 20 and 29 years old. 67 people or 10.3% are between 30 and 39, 148 people or 22.7% are between 40 and 49, and 101 people or 15.5% are between 50 and 59. The senior population distribution is 68 people or 10.4% of the population are between 60 and 69 years old, 32 people or 4.9% are between 70 and 79, there are 16 people or 2.5% who are between 80 and 89, and there are 2 people or 0.3% who are 90 and older.

As of 2000 the average number of residents per living room was 0.58 which is about equal to the cantonal average of 0.57 per room. In this case, a room is defined as space of a housing unit of at least 4 m^{2} (43 sq ft) as normal bedrooms, dining rooms, living rooms, kitchens and habitable cellars and attics.

About 74.3% of the total households were owner occupied, or in other words did not pay rent (though they may have a mortgage or a rent-to-own agreement). As of 2000, there were 17 homes with 1 or 2 persons in the household, 111 homes with 3 or 4 persons in the household, and 121 homes with 5 or more persons in the household. The average number of people per household was 2.57 individuals. In 2008 there were 173 single family homes (or 61.1% of the total) out of a total of 283 homes and apartments. There were a total of 3 empty apartments for a 1.1% vacancy rate. As of 2007, the construction rate of new housing units was 10.9 new units per 1000 residents.

In the 2007 federal election the most popular party was the SVP which received 50.6% of the vote. The next three most popular parties were the SP (14%), the FDP (11.8%) and the Green Party (8.3%).

The entire Swiss population is generally well educated. In Birrhard about 82.8% of the population of ages 25–64 have completed either non-mandatory upper secondary education or additional higher education (either university or a Fachhochschule). Of the school age population (in the 2008/2009 school year), there are 54 students attending primary school in the municipality.

The historical population is given in the following table:

Historical population
Year	Pop.	±%
1850	365	—
1900	236	−35.3%
1930	267	+13.1%
1950	316	+18.4%
1975	352	+11.4%
1980	453	+28.7%
1990	553	+22.1%
2000	618	+11.8%

== Economy ==
As of 2007, Birrhard had an unemployment rate of 1.34%. As of 2005, there were 46 people employed in the primary economic sector and about 11 businesses involved in this sector. 75 people are employed in the secondary sector and there are 6 businesses in this sector. 70 people are employed in the tertiary sector, with 17 businesses in this sector.

As of 2000 there was a total of 368 workers who lived in the municipality. Of these, 319 or about 86.7% of the residents worked outside Birrhard while 109 people commuted into the municipality for work. There were a total of 158 jobs (of at least 6 hours per week) in the municipality. Of the working population, 8.4% used public transportation to get to work, and 66.1% used a private car.

== Religion ==
From the 2000 census, 226 or 33.2% were Roman Catholic, while 351 or 51.5% belonged to the Swiss Reformed Church.
