= Wohlenschwil =

- Municipality
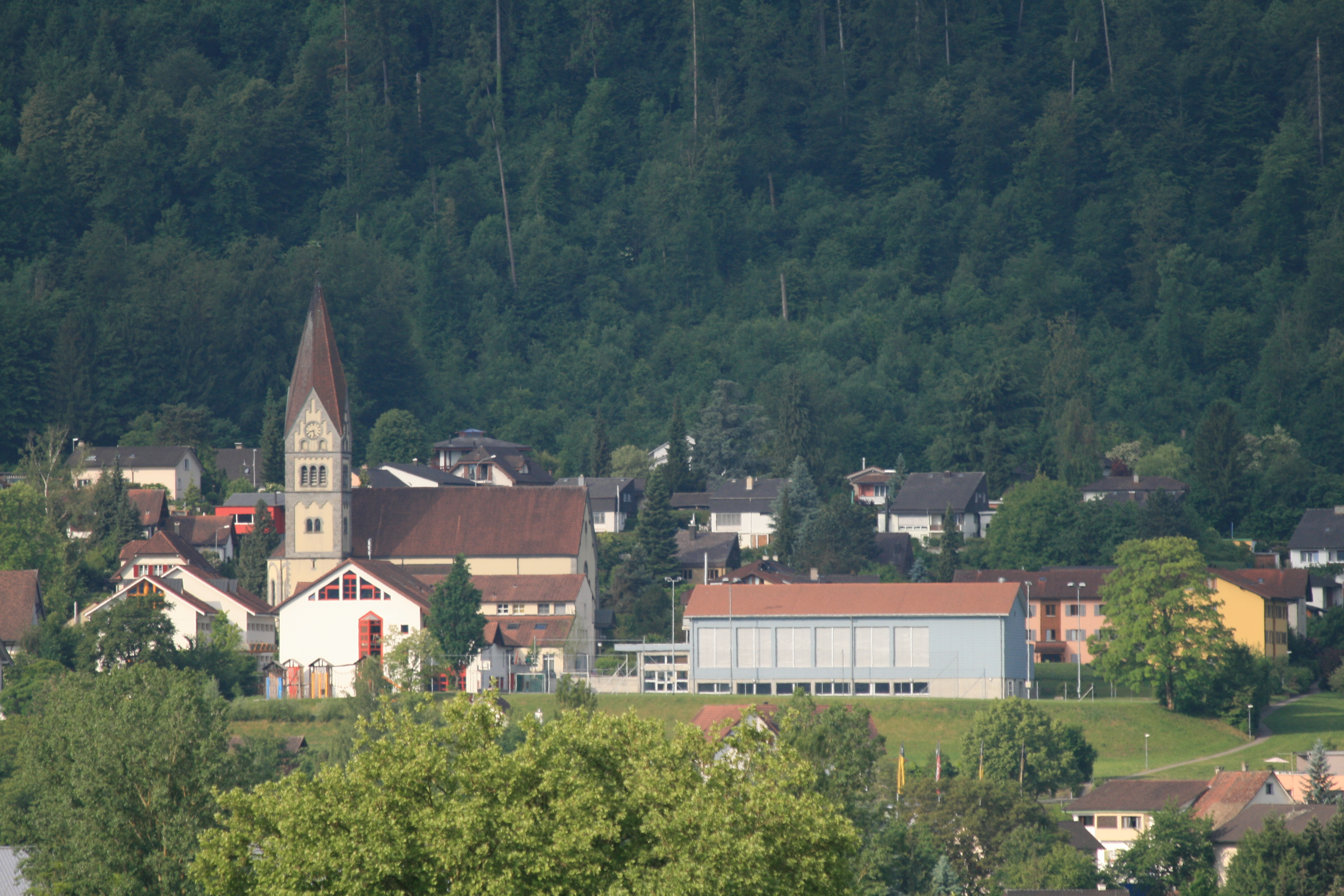

- Flag Coat of arms
- Location of Wohlenschwil
- Location within Switzerland Location within Canton of Aargau
- Coordinates: 47°25′N 8°16′E
- Country: Switzerland
- Canton: Aargau
- District: Baden

Area
  - Total: 4.39 km^{2} (1.69 sq mi)
- Elevation: 374 m (1,227 ft)

Population (December 2020)
  - Total: 1,677
  - Density: 382/km^{2} (989/sq mi)
- Time zone: UTC+01:00 (CET)
  - Summer (DST): UTC+02:00 (CEST)
- Postal code: 5512
- SFOS number: 4046
- ISO 3166 code: CH-AG
- Surrounded by: Birmenstorf, Birrhard, Hägglingen, Mägenwil, Mellingen, Tägerig
- Website: www.wohlenschwil.ch

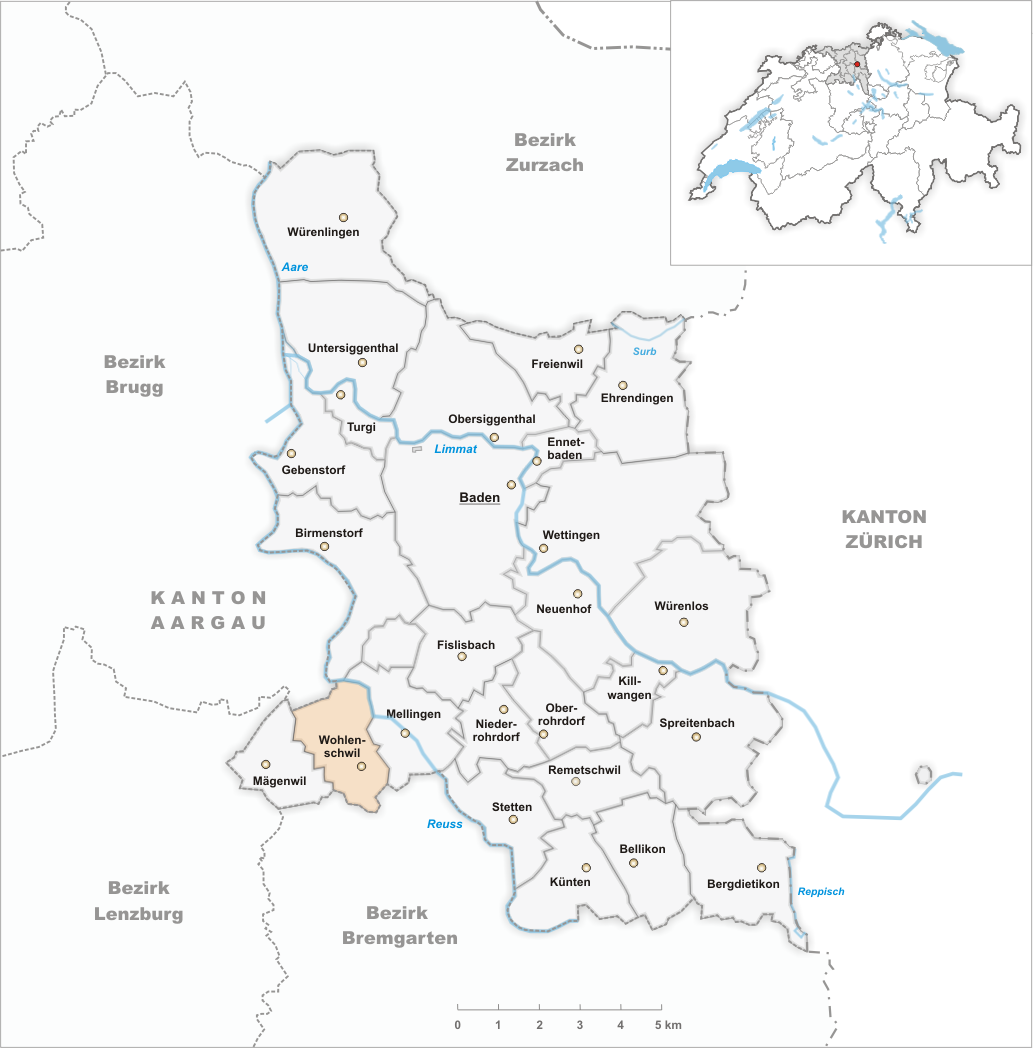
Wohlenschwil

Wohlenschwil is a municipality in the district of Baden in the canton of Aargau in Switzerland.

== History ==
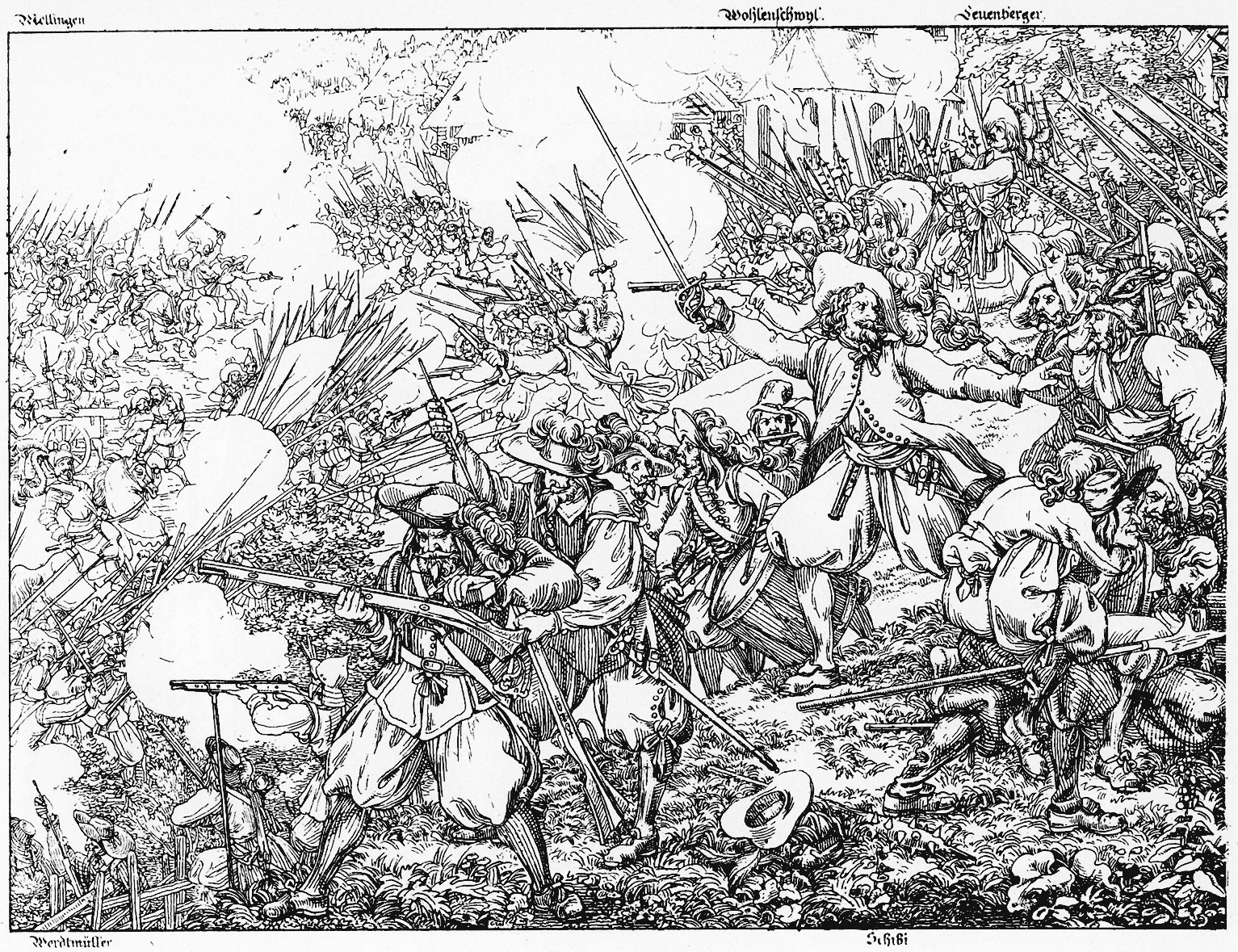
Battle at Wohlenschwil

Aerial view (1964)

On June 3, 1653 Wohlenschwil was the site of the Battle of Wohlenschwil, which ended the Swiss peasant war of 1653. Despite a peace treaty which had been signed between the peasants and the city of Bern, on May 30, 1653, Zürich assembled an army under the command of Conrad Werdmüller with the task to break any armed resistance once and for all times. Some 8,000 men with 800 horses and 18 cannons marched towards the Aargau. Already three days later, Werdmüller's army controlled the important crossing of the river Reuss at Mellingen. In the hills around the nearby villages of Wohlenschwil and Othmarsingen a peasant army of some 24,000 men assembled, led by Leuenberger and Schybi. A peasant delegation tried to negotiate with Werdmüller, showing him the peace treaty concluded with Bern. Werdmüller, who had been until then unaware of this treaty that had been signed only days before, refused to acknowledge the validity of the contract and demanded the unconditional surrender of the peasants. Thus rebutted, the peasants attacked Werdmüller's troops on June 3, 1653, but being poorly equipped and lacking any artillery, they were defeated decisively in the Battle of Wohlenschwil. The peasants were forced to agree to the peace of Mellingen, which annulled the Huttwil League. The peasant troops returned home and an amnesty was declared, except for the leaders of the movement.

== Geography ==
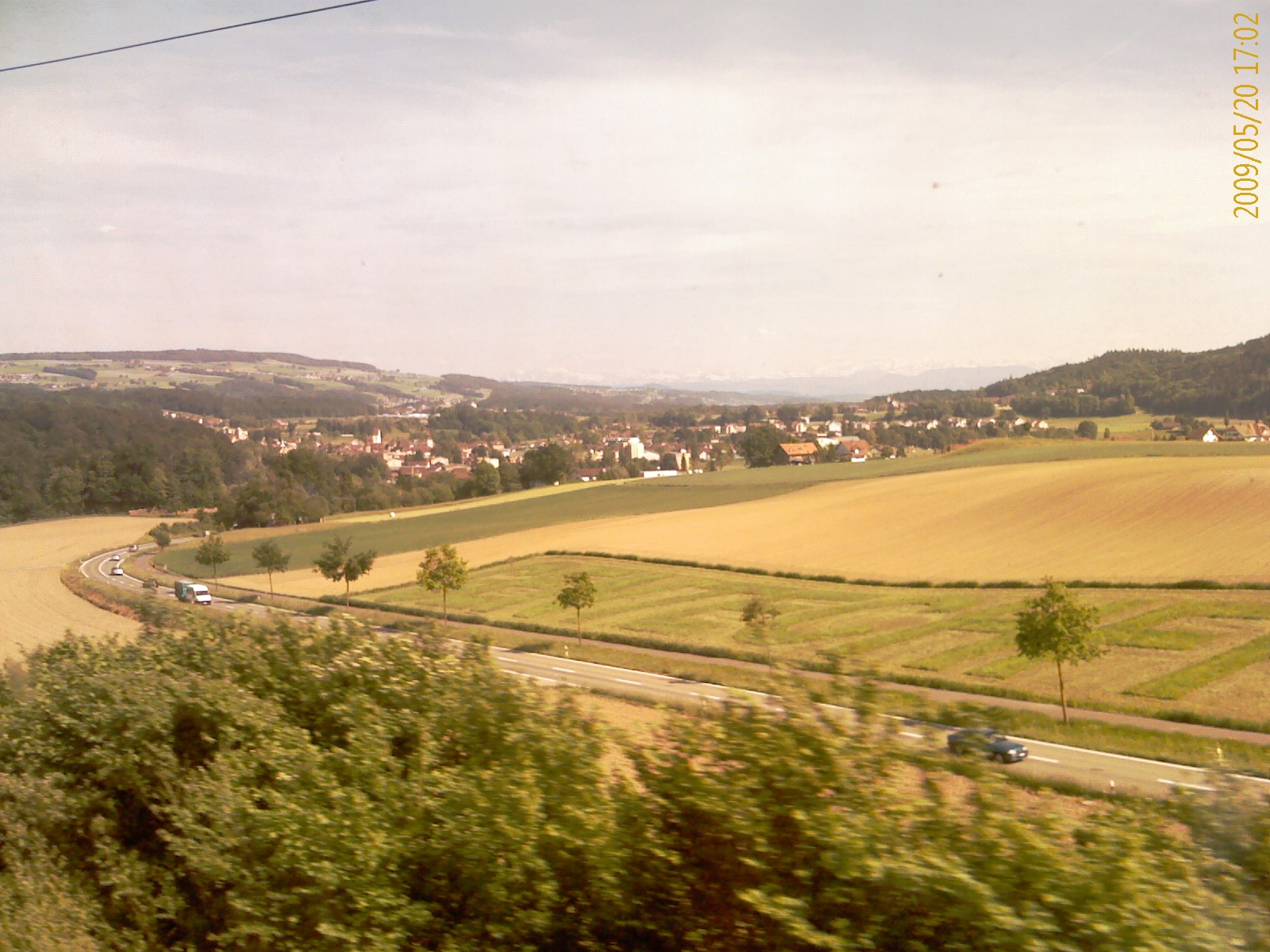
Wohlenschwil and Mellingen from a train

Wohlenschwil has an area, as of 2006, of 4.4 square kilometers (1.7 sq mi). Of this area, 47.7% is used for agricultural purposes, while 35.1% is forested. Of the rest of the land, 14.7% is settled (buildings or roads) and the remainder (2.5%) is non-productive (rivers or lakes).

== Coat of arms ==
The blazon of the municipal coat of arms is Gules a Musket and its Mount Fork saltirewise Or and Argent and in chief Sun in Splendour of the second.

== Demographics ==
Wohlenschwil has a population (as of 31 December 2020) of 1,677. As of 2008, 14.5% of the population was made up of foreign nationals. Over the last 10 years the population has grown at a rate of 3.5%. Most of the population (as of 2000) speaks German (92.7%), with Serbo-Croatian being second most common ( 1.1%) and Italian being third ( 1.0%).

The age distribution, as of 2008, in Wohlenschwil is; 138 children or 10.2% of the population are between 0 and 9 years old and 194 teenagers or 14.4% are between 10 and 19. Of the adult population, 161 people or 11.9% of the population are between 20 and 29 years old. 178 people or 13.2% are between 30 and 39, 230 people or 17.0% are between 40 and 49, and 220 people or 16.3% are between 50 and 59. The senior population distribution is 131 people or 9.7% of the population are between 60 and 69 years old, 67 people or 5.0% are between 70 and 79, there are 28 people or 2.1% who are between 80 and 89, and there are 2 people or 0.1% who are 90 and older.

As of 2000, there were 35 homes with 1 or 2 persons in the household, 187 homes with 3 or 4 persons in the household, and 236 homes with 5 or more persons in the household. The average number of people per household was 2.63 individuals. In 2008 there were 296 single family homes (or 53.7% of the total) out of a total of 551 homes and apartments. There were a total of 4 empty apartments for a 0.7% vacancy rate. As of 2007, the construction rate of new housing units was 3.8 new units per 1000 residents.

In the 2007 federal election the most popular party was the SVP which received 39.8% of the vote. The next three most popular parties were the SP (16.8%), the CVP (13.8%) and the FDP (12%).

In Wohlenschwil about 77.5% of the population (between age 25-64) have completed either non-mandatory upper secondary education or additional higher education (either university or a Fachhochschule). Of the school age population (in the 2008/2009 school year), there are 96 students attending primary school, there are 71 students attending secondary school in the municipality.

The historical population is given in the following table:

Historical population
Year	Pop.	±%
1975	770	—
1980	841	+9.2%
1990	1,094	+30.1%
2000	1,268	+15.9%

== Economy ==
As of 2007, Wohlenschwil had an unemployment rate of 1.35%. As of 2005, there were 51 people employed in the primary economic sector and about 12 businesses involved in this sector. 67 people are employed in the secondary sector and there are 16 businesses in this sector. 128 people are employed in the tertiary sector, with 32 businesses in this sector.

As of 2000 there were 681 total workers who lived in the municipality. Of these, 540 or about 79.3% of the residents worked outside Wohlenschwil while 87 people commuted into the municipality for work. There were a total of 228 jobs (of at least 6 hours per week) in the municipality. Of the working population, 12.2% used public transportation to get to work, and 57.5% used a private car.

== Religion ==
From the 2000 census, 657 or 52.0% are Roman Catholic, while 384 or 30.4% belonged to the Swiss Reformed Church.
