= Isler Straw =

- Native name: Jacob Isler & Co
- Founded: 1787
- Successor: Tressa Ltd.
- Subsidiaries: Jacques Isler Corporation

Isler Straw (officially Jacob Isler & Co respectively Jacques Isler Corporation) was a Swiss multinational company in the straw and hatmaking industry headquartered in Wohlen, Switzerland. Founded in 1787, Isler was a leading millinery producer, until manufacturing operations ceased in 1991 due to deindustrialisation.

In 1852, Jean Isler-Cabezas (1827–1897), founded the subsidiary Jacques Isler Corporation in New York City, which existed until 1872. It was later reestablished and had offices in the Textile District until the 1970s. In 1976, the straw museum, was founded which also later consolidated the estate of the company.
