= Birmenstorf =

- Municipality
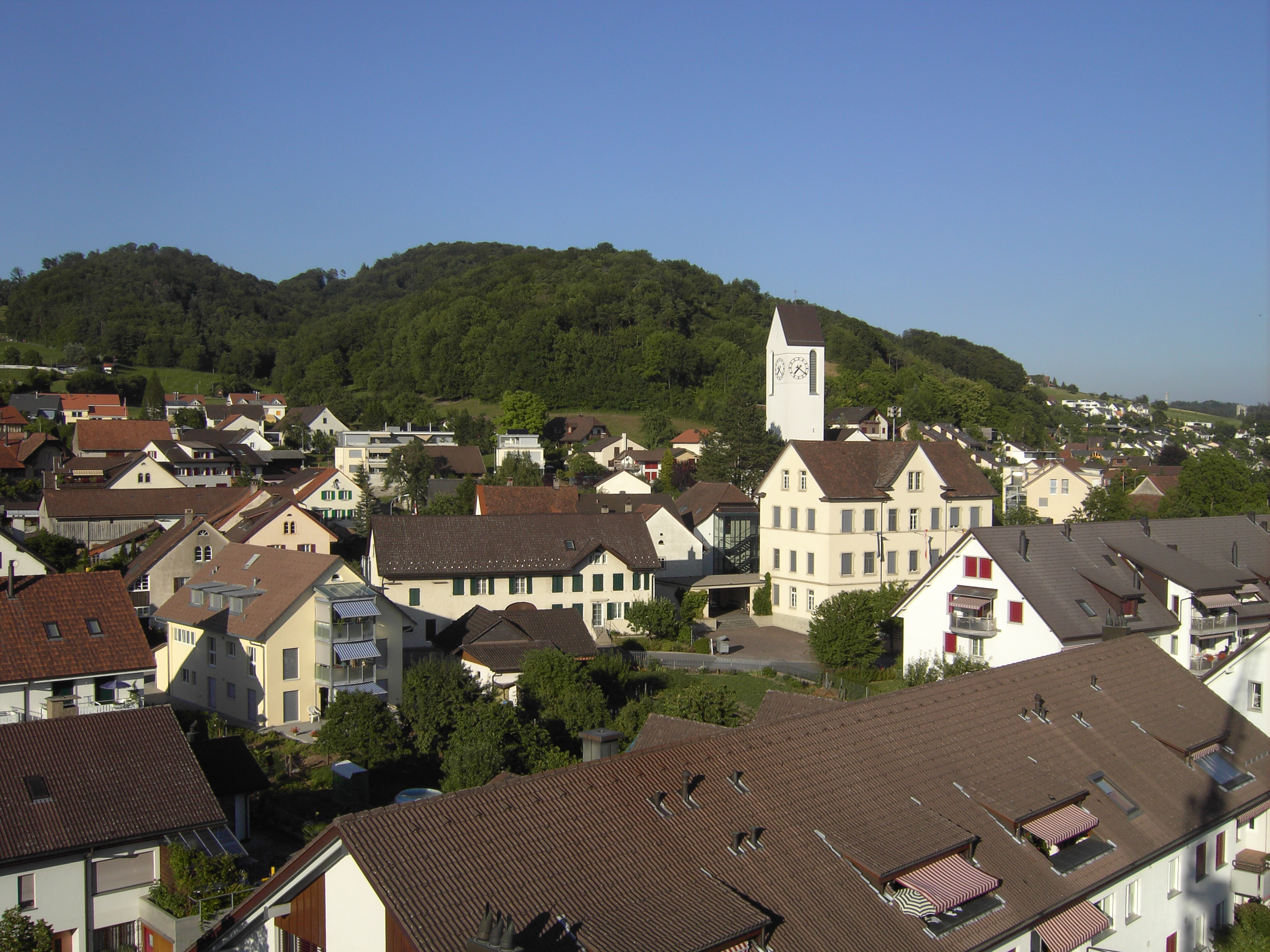

- Flag Coat of arms
- Location of Birmenstorf
- Location within Switzerland Location within Canton of Aargau
- Coordinates: 47°28′N 8°15′E
- Country: Switzerland
- Canton: Aargau
- District: Baden

Area
  - Total: 7.80 km^{2} (3.01 sq mi)
- Elevation: 382 m (1,253 ft)

Population (December 2020)
  - Total: 2,962
  - Density: 380/km^{2} (984/sq mi)
- Time zone: UTC+01:00 (CET)
  - Summer (DST): UTC+02:00 (CEST)
- Postal code: 5413
- SFOS number: 4024
- ISO 3166 code: CH-AG
- Surrounded by: Baden, Birrhard, Fislisbach, Gebenstorf, Mellingen, Mülligen, Windisch, Wohlenschwil
- Website: birmenstorf.ch

Birmenstorf is a municipality in the district of Baden in the canton of Aargau in Switzerland.

Aerial view (1964)

== History ==
The first written mention of Birmenstorf dates to 1146. In 1415, the Eidgenossenschaft conquered the Aargau, and Birmenstorf as part of the Habsburg County of Baden came under their sovereignty. During the Reformation, about a third of the population converted to Protestantism. The choir of the old church with frescos dating to 1440 still exists today.

For over 600 years, vineyards have been cultivated in Birmenstorf.

== Archeology ==
Archeological findings indicate that the area was inhabited as early as the Stone Age. The village proper was most likely founded by Alamanni settlers probably in the 6th century.

== Geography ==
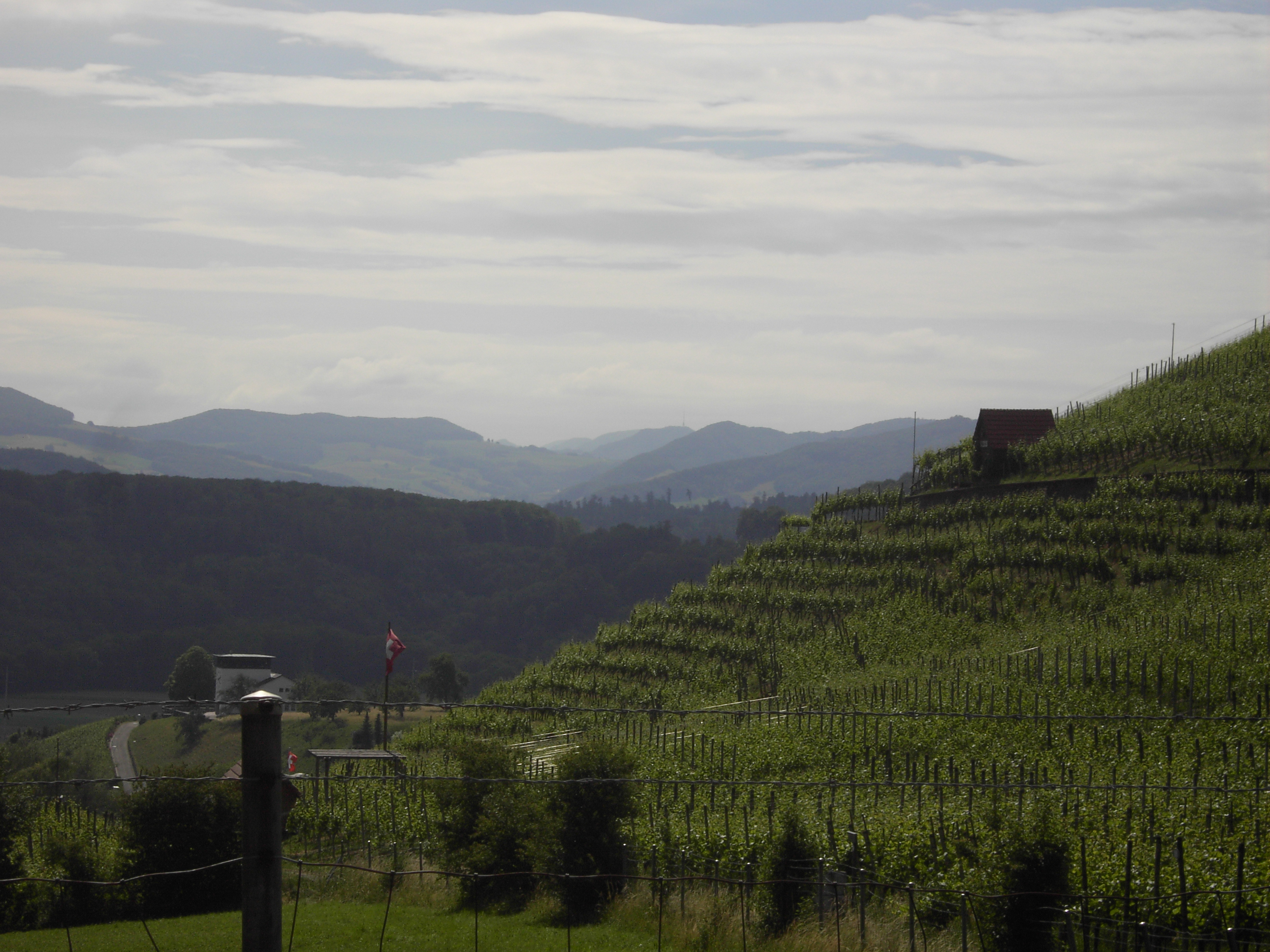
Terraced vineyards outside Birmenstorf

Birmenstorf has an area, as of 2006, of 7.7 km^{2} (3.0 sq mi). Of this area, 44% is used for agricultural purposes, while 36.8% is forested. Of the rest of the land, 15.8% is settled (buildings or roads) and the remainder (3.4%) is non-productive (rivers or lakes).

The municipality is located in the Baden district, in the valley of the Reuss near its confluence with the Aare and 4 km (2.5 mi) west-south-west from Baden. It consists of the village of Birmenstorf and the hamlets of Lindmühle, Muntwil, Müslen and Oberhard as well as a new housing development.

== Coat of arms ==
The blazon of the municipal coat of arms is Vert a Garb Or.

== Demographics ==
Birmenstorf has a population (as of 31 December 2020) of 2,962. As of 2008, 19.0% of the population was made up of foreign nationals. Over the last 10 years the population has grown at a rate of 7.1%. Most of the population (as of 2000) speaks German (90.3%), with Portuguese being second most common ( 2.0%) and Albanian being third ( 1.6%).

The age distribution, as of 2008, in Birmenstorf is; 249 children or 10.0% of the population are between 0 and 9 years old and 301 teenagers or 12.1% are between 10 and 19. Of the adult population, 343 people or 13.8% of the population are between 20 and 29 years old. 388 people or 15.6% are between 30 and 39, 445 people or 17.9% are between 40 and 49, and 310 people or 12.4% are between 50 and 59. The senior population distribution is 236 people or 9.5% of the population are between 60 and 69 years old, 152 people or 6.1% are between 70 and 79, there are 62 people or 2.5% who are between 80 and 89, and there are 4 people or 0.2% who are 90 and older.

As of 2000, there were 71 homes with 1 or 2 persons in the household, 426 homes with 3 or 4 persons in the household, and 396 homes with 5 or more persons in the household. The average number of people per household was 2.51 individuals. In 2008 there were 486 single family homes (or 45.1% of the total) out of a total of 1,078 homes and apartments.

In the 2007 federal election the most popular party was the SVP which received 35.6% of the vote. The next three most popular parties were the CVP (23.1%), the FDP (12.2%) and the SP (11.5%).

The entire Swiss population is generally well educated. In Birmenstorf about 81% of the population (between age 25–64) have completed either non-mandatory upper secondary education or additional higher education (either university or a Fachhochschule). Of the school age population (in the 2008/2009 school year), there are 180 students attending primary school, there are 22 students attending secondary school in the municipality.

The historical population is given in the following table:

Historical population
Year	Pop.	±%
1799	630	—
1850	992	+57.5%
1900	919	−7.4%
1950	1,197	+30.3%
2000	2,313	+93.2%

== Economy ==
As of 2007, Birmenstorf had an unemployment rate of 1.68%. As of 2005, there were 129 people employed in the primary economic sector and about 23 businesses involved in this sector. 330 people are employed in the secondary sector and there are 26 businesses in this sector. 328 people are employed in the tertiary sector, with 68 businesses in this sector.

As of 2000 there was a total of 1,267 workers who lived in the municipality. Of these, 1,015 or about 80.1% of the residents worked outside Birmenstorf while 395 people commuted into the municipality for work. There were a total of 647 jobs (of at least 6 hours per week) in the municipality.

== Religion ==
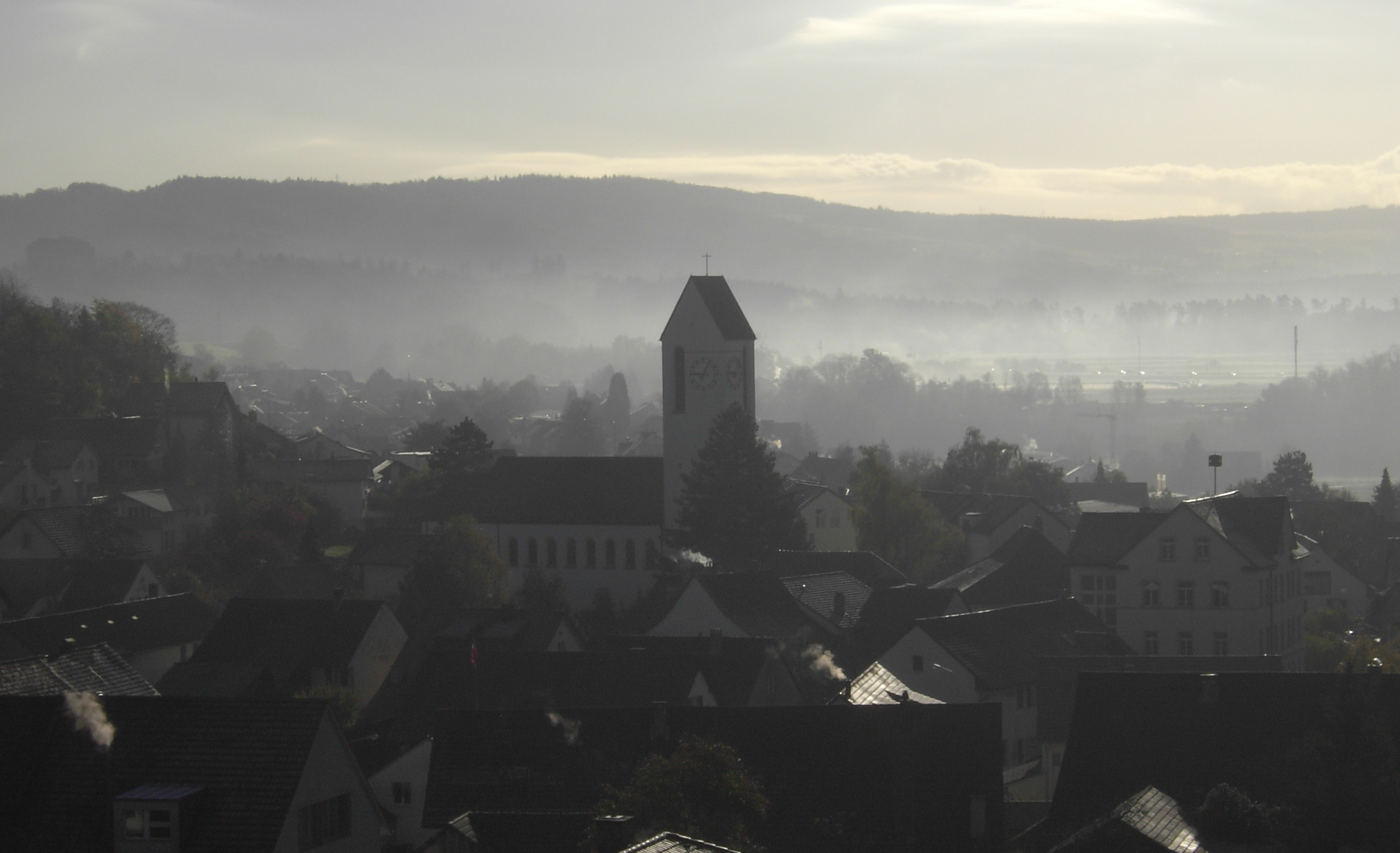
View on the Catholic Church

From the 2000 census, 1,108 or 47.9% are Roman Catholic, while 766 or 33.1% belonged to the Swiss Reformed Church. Of the rest of the population, there are 7 individuals (or about 0.30% of the population) who belong to the Christian Catholic faith.
