= Hägglingen =

- Municipality
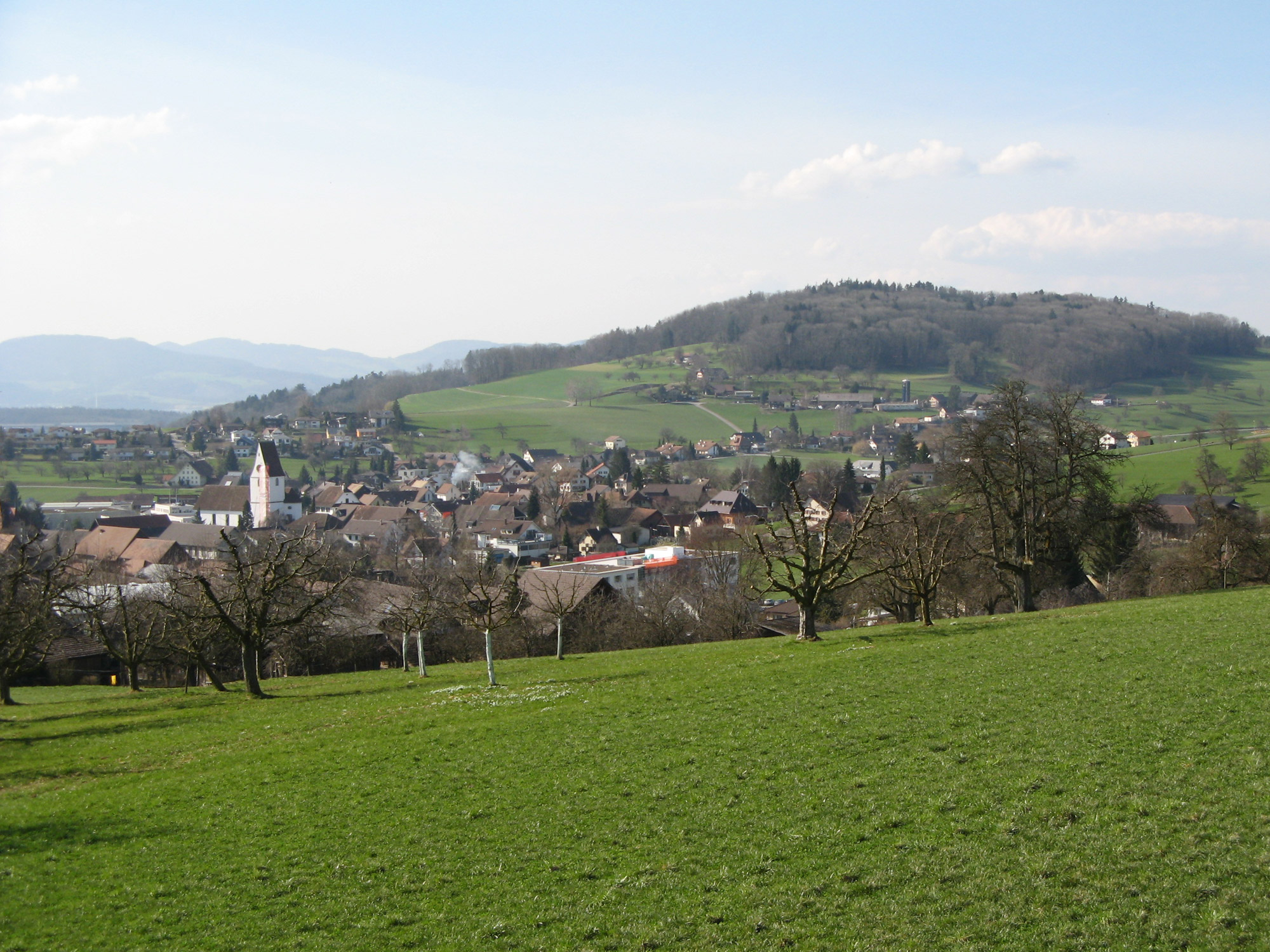

- Flag Coat of arms
- Location of Hägglingen
- Location within Switzerland Location within Canton of Aargau
- Coordinates: 47°23′N 8°15′E
- Country: Switzerland
- Canton: Aargau
- District: Bremgarten

Area
  - Total: 7.73 km^{2} (2.98 sq mi)
- Elevation: 472 m (1,549 ft)

Population (December 2020)
  - Total: 2,437
  - Density: 315/km^{2} (817/sq mi)
- Time zone: UTC+01:00 (CET)
  - Summer (DST): UTC+02:00 (CEST)
- Postal code: 5607
- SFOS number: 4068
- ISO 3166 code: CH-AG
- Surrounded by: Dottikon, Mägenwil, Niederwil, Othmarsingen, Tägerig, Wohlen, Wohlenschwil
- Website: www.haegglingen.ch

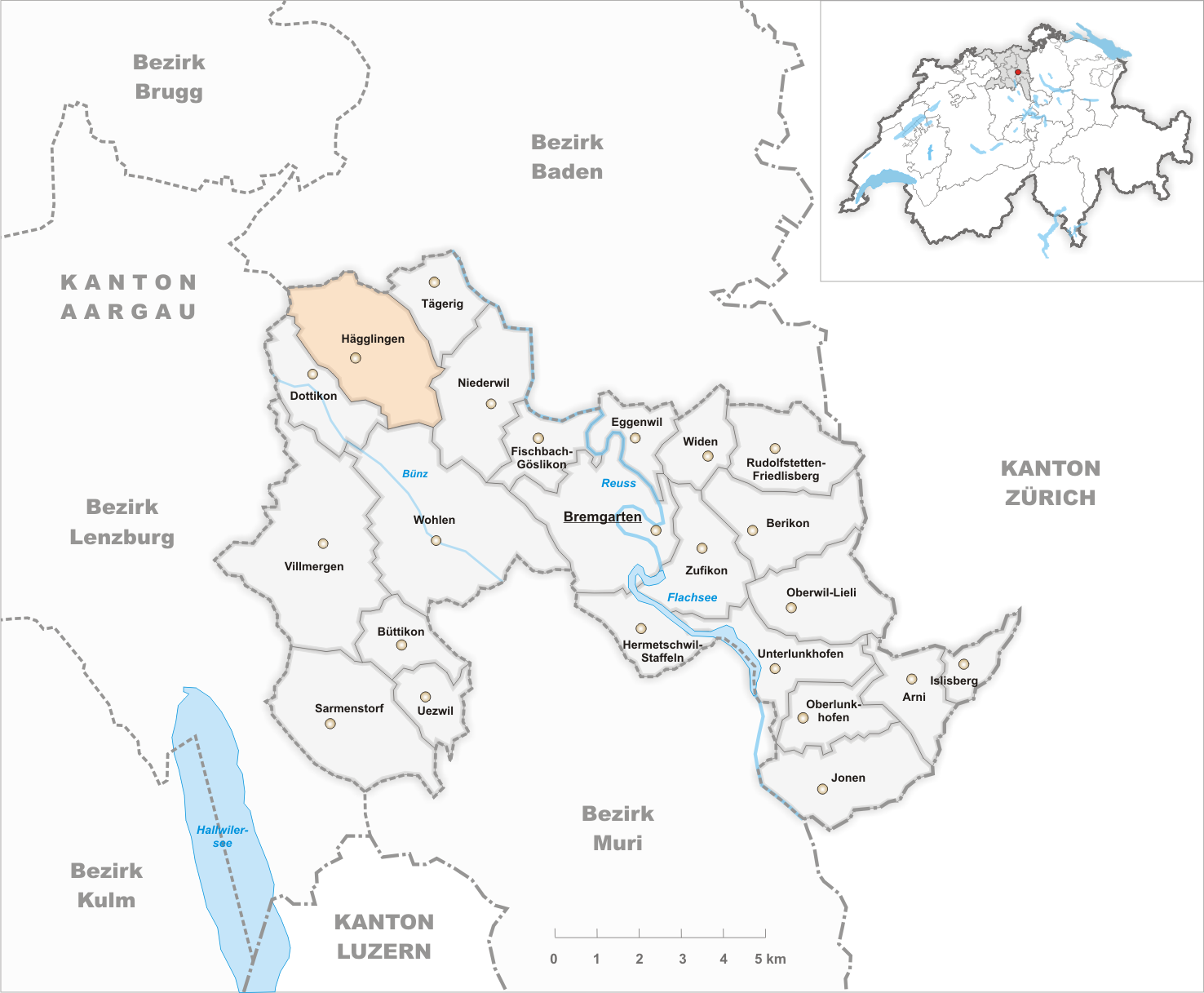
Hägglingen

Hägglingen is a municipality in the district of Bremgarten in the canton of Aargau in Switzerland.

Aerial view (1967)

== History ==
The first evidence of a settlement comes from barrows from the Hallstatt period. There is also evidence of small Roman era settlements.

The first mention of modern Hägglingen is in 1036 when Count Ulrich von Lenzburg granted the church and farm of Hekelingen to Beromünster. In the acknowledgments of Emperor Henry III in 1045, the village of Hackelingen was mentioned. Frederick I Barbarossa acknowledged the grants to the village in 1173. The Vogtei (bailiwick) went from the Lenzburg family to the Kyburgs and then in 1273 to the Lords of Hallwyl. The high court rights were exercised by the Habsburgs until the Swiss conquered the Aargau in 1415. It was not until 1425 that Hägglingen, which was claimed by Lucerne, came under the authority of the entire confederacy. It was first assigned to the district court of Wohlenschwil before it became an independent municipality from 1435 to 1712.

The Dorfoffnung regulations of 1609 include laws for the exploitation of forests and regulated irrigation. At this time Hägglingen was acting as a fully independent municipality. Between 1611 and 1613, 150 people died of the plague. It was sacked and partly burned in 1656 by Bernese troops.

The parish church of St. Michael was built in 1457–66, though only the tower and choir of the original church were retained. The church was expanded in 1638–39, and renovated in 1739. In 1951, the late gothic choir frescoes of 1480–90, which had survived the iconoclasm of 1529, were discovered.

In addition to agriculture and small businesses, the straw plaiting industry started in the 18th century and grew in the 19th to be one of the main industries of the village. The distance to the nearest train station, Dottikon, delayed industrial development of Hägglingen. By 2003, a number of medium and small businesses, primarily in the plastics industry, offered approximately 520 jobs.

== Geography ==
Hägglingen has an area, as of 2006, of 7.8 square kilometers (3.0 sq mi). Of this area, 56.8% is used for agricultural purposes, while 32.9% is forested. The rest of the land, (10.3%) is settled.

The municipality is located in the Bremgarten district on an elevated side valley of the Bünztales. It consists of the village of Hägglingen and the hamlets of Igelweid and Rüti (since 1823).

== Coat of arms ==
The blazon of the municipal coat of arms is Azure a Flax Comb Or spiked Argent.

== Demographics ==
Hägglingen has a population (as of 31 December 2020) of 2,437. As of 2008, 13.0% of the population was made up of foreign nationals. Over the last 10 years the population has grown at a rate of 8.1%. Most of the population (as of 2000) speaks German (92.4%), with Albanian being second most common ( 1.6%) and Serbo-Croatian being third ( 1.6%).

The age distribution, as of 2008, in Hägglingen is; 229 children or 10.5% of the population are between 0 and 9 years old and 264 teenagers or 12.1% are between 10 and 19. Of the adult population, 242 people or 11.1% of the population are between 20 and 29 years old. 330 people or 15.1% are between 30 and 39, 398 people or 18.2% are between 40 and 49, and 289 people or 13.3% are between 50 and 59. The senior population distribution is 202 people or 9.3% of the population are between 60 and 69 years old, 143 people or 6.6% are between 70 and 79, there are 72 people or 3.3% who are between 80 and 89, and there are 12 people or 0.6% who are 90 and older.

As of 2000 the average number of residents per living room was 0.55 which is about equal to the cantonal average of 0.57 per room. In this case, a room is defined as space of a housing unit of at least 4 m^{2} (43 sq ft) as normal bedrooms, dining rooms, living rooms, kitchens and habitable cellars and attics. About 62.9% of the total households were owner occupied, or in other words did not pay rent (though they may have a mortgage or a rent-to-own agreement). As of 2000, there were 63 homes with 1 or 2 persons in the household, 295 homes with 3 or 4 persons in the household, and 384 homes with 5 or more persons in the household. The average number of people per household was 2.53 individuals. In 2008 there were 506 single family homes (or 55.4% of the total) out of a total of 913 homes and apartments. There were a total of 4 empty apartments for a 0.4% vacancy rate. As of 2007, the construction rate of new housing units was 8.4 new units per 1000 residents.

In the 2007 federal election the most popular party was the SVP which received 39% of the vote. The next three most popular parties were the CVP (21.2%), the SP (13.7%) and the FDP (12%).

The entire Swiss population is generally well educated. In Hägglingen about 73.8% of the population (between age 25 and 64) have completed either non-mandatory upper secondary education or additional higher education (either university or a Fachhochschule). Of the school age population (in the 2008/2009 school year), there are 193 students attending primary school, there are 46 students attending secondary school in the municipality.

The historical population is given in the following table:

Historical population
Year	Pop.	±%
1850	1,535	—
1900	1,415	−7.8%
1950	1,514	+7.0%
2000	1,990	+31.4%

== Economy ==
As of 2007, Hägglingen had an unemployment rate of 1.58%. As of 2005, there were 128 people employed in the primary economic sector and about 37 businesses involved in this sector. 436 people are employed in the secondary sector and there are 29 businesses in this sector. 174 people are employed in the tertiary sector, with 45 businesses in this sector.

As of 2000 there was a total of 1,041 workers who lived in the municipality. Of these, 731 or about 70.2% of the residents worked outside Hägglingen while 347 people commuted into the municipality for work. There were a total of 657 jobs (of at least 6 hours per week) in the municipality. Of the working population, 7.4% used public transportation to get to work, and 54.3% used a private car.

== Religion ==
From the 2000 census, 1,149 or 57.7% were Roman Catholic, while 464 or 23.3% belonged to the Swiss Reformed Church. Of the rest of the population, there was 1 individual who belonged to the Christian Catholic faith.
