= Mägenwil =

- Municipality
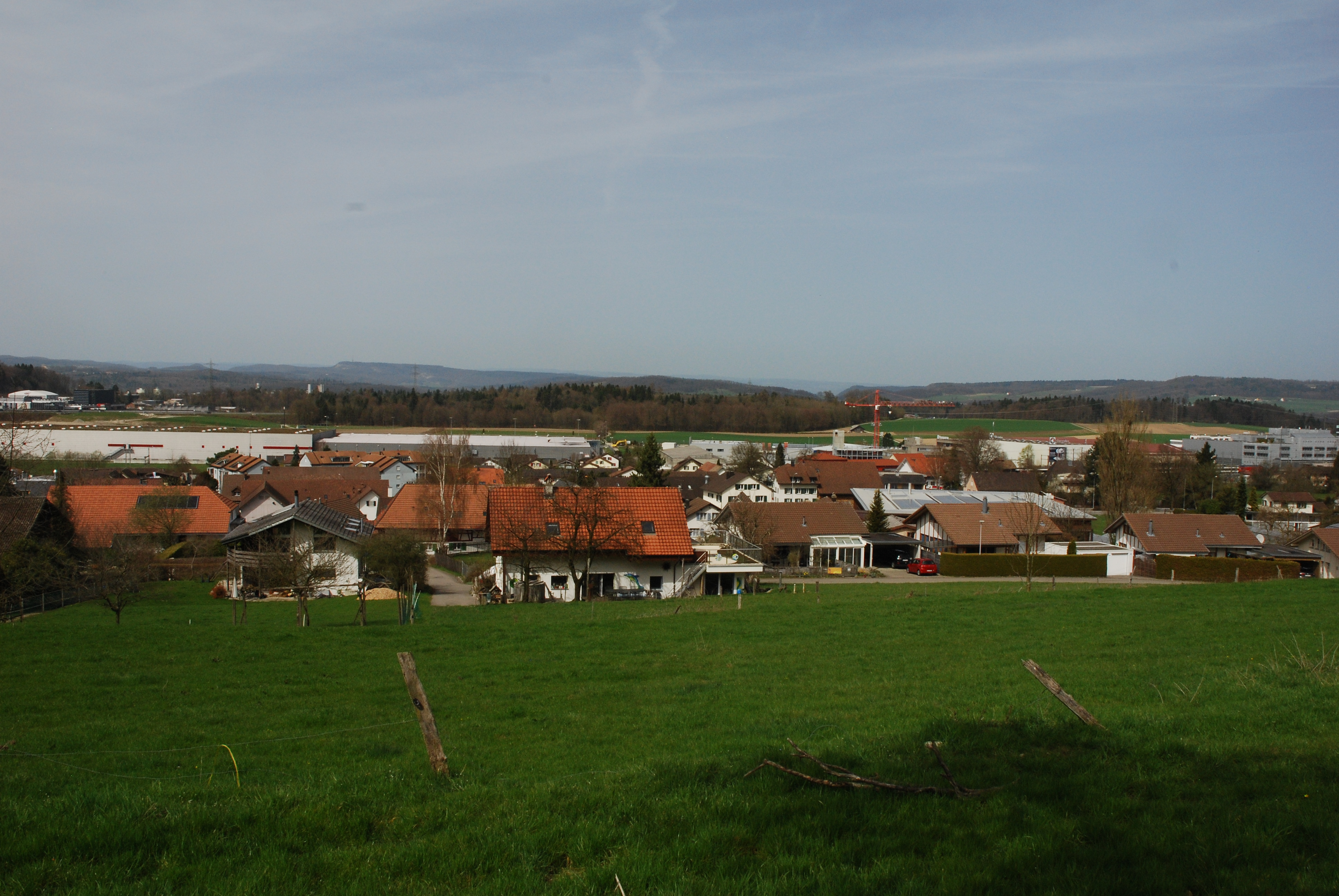

- Flag Coat of arms
- Location of Mägenwil
- Location within Switzerland Location within Canton of Aargau
- Coordinates: 47°25′N 8°14′E
- Country: Switzerland
- Canton: Aargau
- District: Baden

Area
  - Total: 3.48 km^{2} (1.34 sq mi)
- Elevation: 423 m (1,388 ft)

Population (December 2020)
  - Total: 2,139
  - Density: 615/km^{2} (1,590/sq mi)
- Time zone: UTC+01:00 (CET)
  - Summer (DST): UTC+02:00 (CEST)
- Postal code: 5506
- SFOS number: 4032
- ISO 3166 code: CH-AG
- Surrounded by: Birrhard, Brunegg, Hägglingen, Othmarsingen, Wohlenschwil
- Website: www.maegenwil.ch

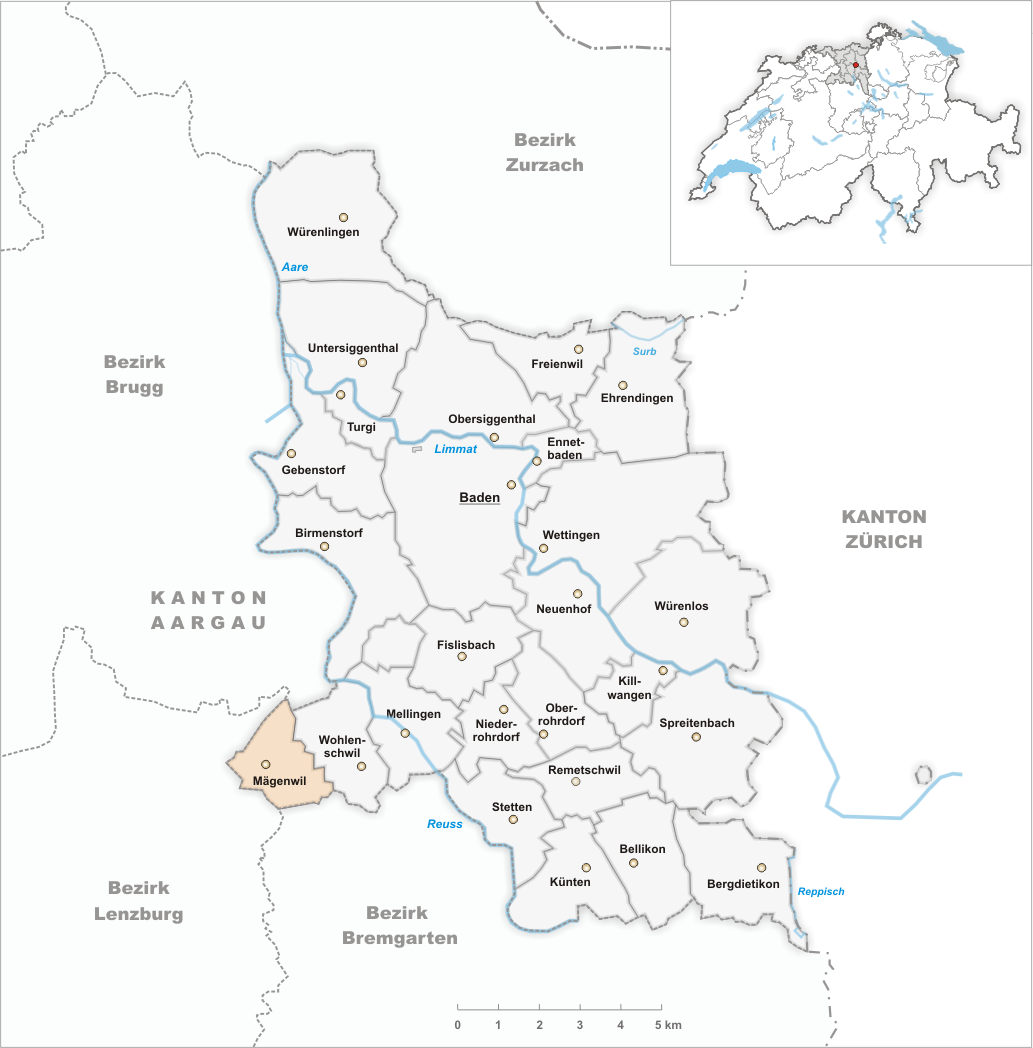
Mägenwil

Mägenwil is a municipality in the district of Baden in the canton of Aargau in Switzerland.

== History ==
Mägenwil is first mentioned in 924 as Maganwilare. In 1273 it was mentioned as Echwile.

== Geography ==
Aerial view (1964)

Mägenwil has an area, as of 2006, of 3.5 km^{2} (1.4 sq mi). Of this area, 45.7% is used for agricultural purposes, while 30.3% is forested. The rest of the land, (24%) is settled.

The municipality is located in the Baden district, on the southern edge of the Birrfeld region. It consists of the linear village of Mägenwil and the hamlets of Eckwil with which it was grown together. Before 1905 Eckwil was an independent municipality.

== Coat of arms ==
The blazon of the municipal coat of arms is Gules a Poppy Seedpod Or slipped and leaved.

== Demographics ==
Mägenwil has a population (as of 31 December 2020) of 2,139. As of 2008, 17.3% of the population was made up of foreign nationals. Over the last 10 years the population has grown at a rate of 25.8%. Most of the population (as of 2000) speaks German (88.7%), with Serbo-Croatian being second most common ( 1.9%) and Albanian being third ( 1.8%).

The age distribution, as of 2008, in Mägenwil is; 223 children or 12.1% of the population are between 0 and 9 years old and 266 teenagers or 14.4% are between 10 and 19. Of the adult population, 217 people or 11.8% of the population are between 20 and 29 years old. 285 people or 15.5% are between 30 and 39, 349 people or 19.0% are between 40 and 49, and 212 people or 11.5% are between 50 and 59. The senior population distribution is 151 people or 8.2% of the population are between 60 and 69 years old, 104 people or 5.6% are between 70 and 79, there are 29 people or 1.6% who are between 80 and 89, and there are 5 people or 0.3% who are 90 and older.

As of 2000, there were 52 homes with 1 or 2 persons in the household, 257 homes with 3 or 4 persons in the household, and 276 homes with 5 or more persons in the household. The average number of people per household was 2.54 individuals. In 2008 there were 350 single family homes (or 49.2% of the total) out of a total of 712 homes and apartments.

In the 2007 federal election the most popular party was the SVP which received 42.3% of the vote. The next three most popular parties were the CVP (17.4%), the FDP (14.6%) and the SP (11.1%).

The entire Swiss population is generally well educated. In Mägenwil about 74.1% of the population (between age 25–64) have completed either non-mandatory upper secondary education or additional higher education (either university or a Fachhochschule). Of the school age population (in the 2008/2009 school year), there are 176 students attending primary school in the municipality.

The historical population is given in the following table:

Historical population
Year	Pop.	±%
1799	339	—
1850	511	+50.7%
1900	450	−11.9%
1950	633	+40.7%
2000	1,551	+145.0%
2010	1,963	+26.6%

== Transportation ==
Mägenwil railway station is a stop of the S-Bahn Zürich on the line S11.

== Economy ==
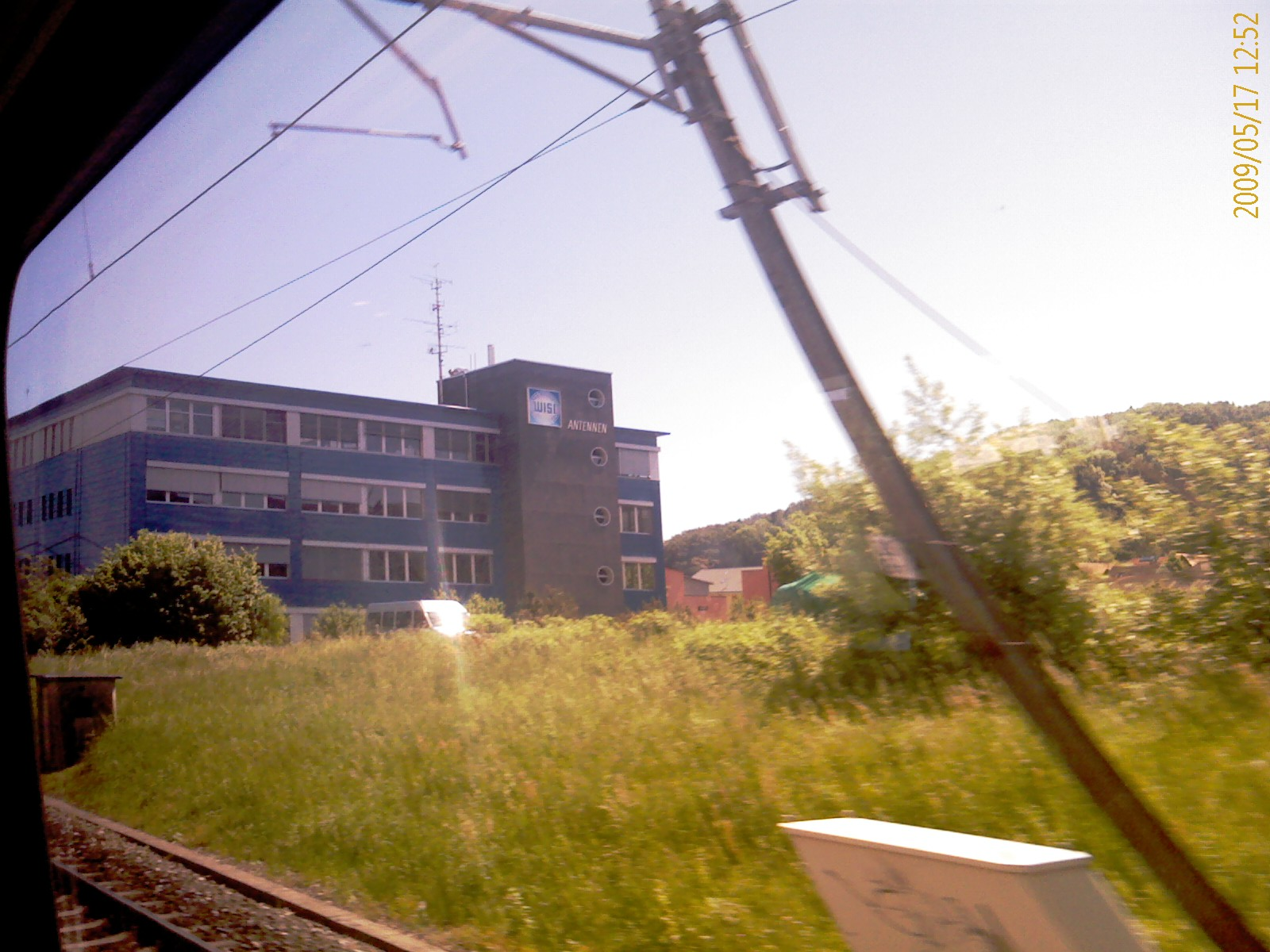
Wisi (Wilhelm Sihn AG), an electronics manufacturer, in Mägenwil

As of 2007, Mägenwil had an unemployment rate of 2.06%. As of 2005, there were 38 people employed in the primary economic sector and about 9 businesses involved in this sector. 324 people are employed in the secondary sector and there are 20 businesses in this sector. 1,158 people are employed in the tertiary sector, with 95 businesses in this sector.

As of 2000 there was a total of 828 workers who lived in the municipality. Of these, 644 or about 77.8% of the residents worked outside Mägenwil while 1,238 people commuted into the municipality for work. There were a total of 1,422 jobs (of at least 6 hours per week) in the municipality.

== Religion ==
From the 2000 census, 703 or 45.3% are Roman Catholic, while 501 or 32.3% belonged to the Swiss Reformed Church. Of the rest of the population, there are 2 individuals (or about 0.13% of the population) who belong to the Christian Catholic faith.
