= Rohrdorf, Switzerland =

Former municipality in Aargau, Switzerland

Rohrdorf
- Former municipality
- Former location within Switzerland
- Coordinates: 47°25′N 8°18′E
- Country: Switzerland
- Canton: Aargau
- District: Baden
- Time zone: UTC+1 (CET)
  - Summer (DST): UTC+2 (CEST)

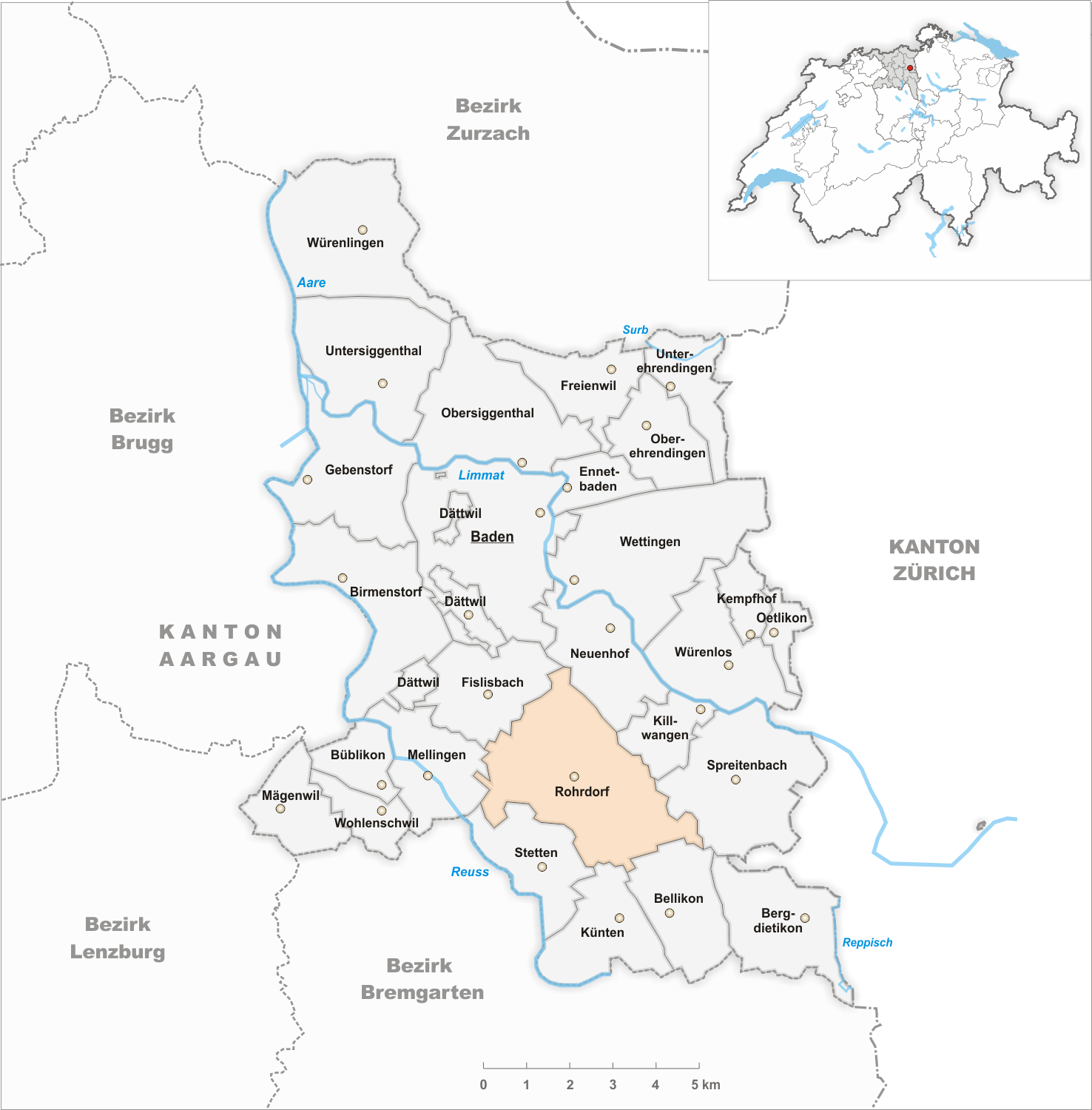

Rohrdorf (Swiss Standard German pronunciation: [ˈroːrdɔrf]) is a former municipality in the district of Baden in the canton of Aargau, Switzerland. It ceased to exist in 1854, when it was split into the three new municipalities Niederrohrdorf, Oberrohrdorf and Remetschwil.
