= Marquard Zelger =

Marquard Zelger may refer to:

- Marquard Zelger (politician, died 1443), Landammann of Nidwalden, killed in the Old Zurich War
- Marquard Zelger (politician, died 1510), Landammann of Nidwalden and mercenary leader in the Burgundian Wars
- Marquard Zelger (politician, died 1535), Landammann of Nidwalden, who led the vanguard in the Second War of Kappel
