= Nisheeth Kumar Singh =

Nisheeth Kumar Singh from the Swissgrid ag, Fislisbach, Aargau, Switzerland was named Fellow of the Institute of Electrical and Electronics Engineers (IEEE) in 2012 for contributions to online control and analysis for power systems.
