= Rohrdorf =

Rohrdorf may refer to:

- Rohrdorf, Bavaria in the district of Rosenheim in Germany
- Rohrdorf, Baden-Württemberg,a municipality of the district of Calw in Baden-Württemberg, Germany
- Rohrdorf, Meßkirch, a part of Meßkirch, a town in the district of Sigmaringen in Baden-Württemberg, Germany
- Rohrdorf, Switzerland in Aargau, Switzerland
