= Künten =

- Municipality
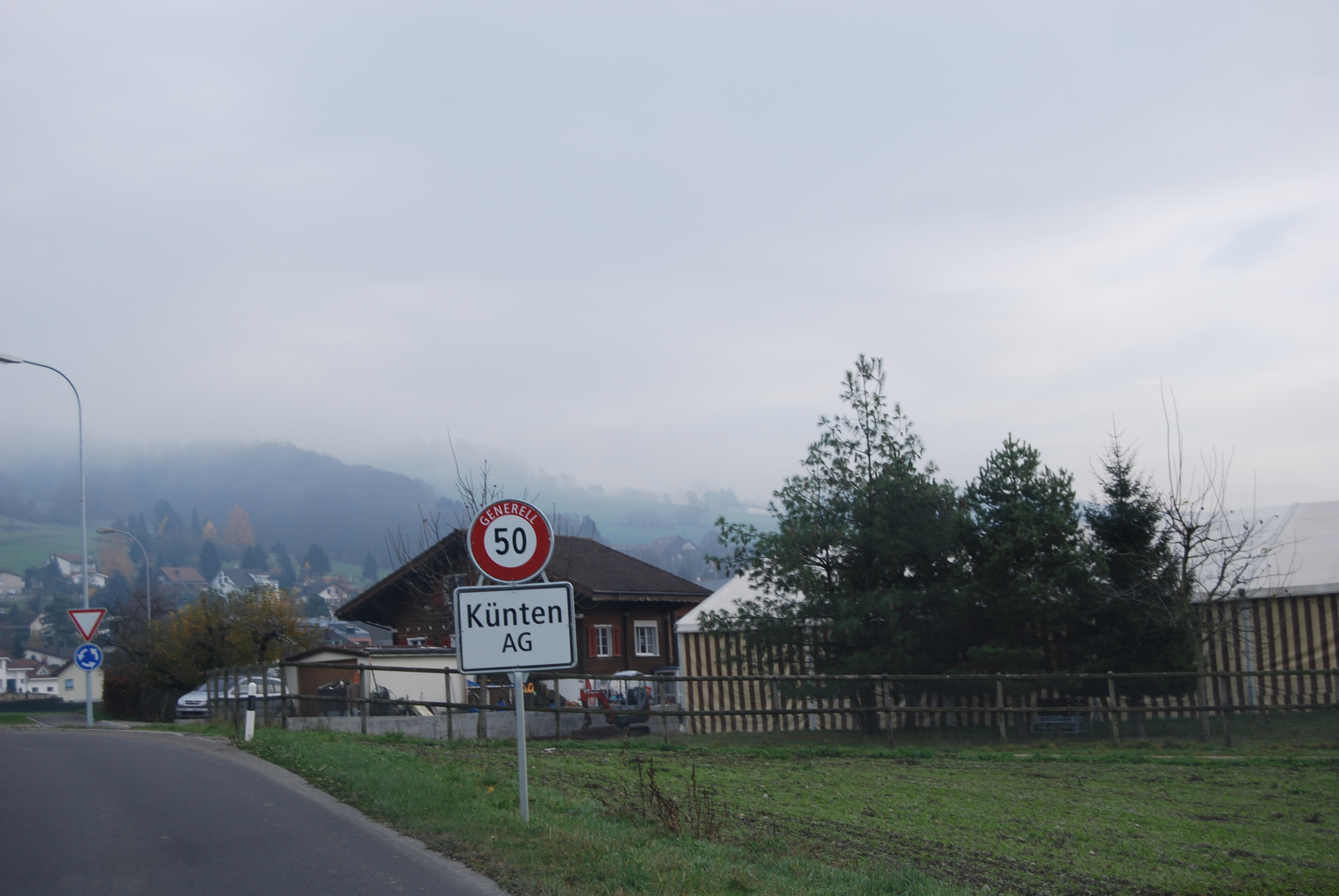

- Flag Coat of arms
- Location of Künten
- Location within Switzerland Location within Canton of Aargau
- Coordinates: 47°24′N 8°20′E
- Country: Switzerland
- Canton: Aargau
- District: Baden

Area
  - Total: 4.89 km^{2} (1.89 sq mi)
- Elevation: 425 m (1,394 ft)

Population (December 2020)
  - Total: 1,838
  - Density: 376/km^{2} (973/sq mi)
- Time zone: UTC+01:00 (CET)
  - Summer (DST): UTC+02:00 (CEST)
- Postal code: 5444
- SFOS number: 4031
- ISO 3166 code: CH-AG
- Surrounded by: Bellikon, Eggenwil, Fischbach-Göslikon, Niederwil, Remetschwil, Stetten
- Website: kuenten.ch

Künten is a municipality in the district of Baden in the canton of Aargau in Switzerland. It lies on the Reuss River and includes the previously independent community of Sulz, which merged with Künten in 1973.

== History ==
Various finds point to an early settlement. Coins, shards, bronze and iron tools from a Roman settlement from the early 2nd century were discovered near Künten, while archaeologists discovered a burial mound near Sulz. Chünten and Sulzo were first mentioned in documents around 1160 in the Acta Murensia, which identified the villages as the property of Muri Abbey. The place name Künten comes from the late Latin (praedium) Quintinacum and means "estate belonging to Quintinus". The current form of the name came about through a sound shift via the Old High German Chüntinacha.

In the Middle Ages, the municipality was under the rule of the Habsburgs, who also exercised blood jurisdiction. Most of the lower jurisdiction was in the hands of the Hermetschwil Abbey. From 1392, a farm in Künten belonged to the Chapel of St. Nicholas in Baden. In 1415, the Confederates conquered Aargau. Both villages were now part of the Amt Rohrdorf in the county of Baden, a common lordship. After the Reformation was introduced in 1529, the inhabitants had to return to the Catholic denomination after the Second Kappel War of 1531.

In March 1798, the French invaded Switzerland and proclaimed the Helvetic Republic. Künten and Sulz initially belonged to the short-lived Canton of Baden, and from 1803 to the Canton of Aargau. Both villages formed a joint municipality, but were also two separate local communities with a certain degree of autonomy. This structure remained in place until 1973, when the Ortsbürgergemeinden were dissolved and merged with the Einwohnergemeinde. On June 10, 1866, a major fire in Künten destroyed 14 thatched houses. Künten remained dominated by agriculture until well into the 20th century. With the opening of the nearby highway, the population began to increase significantly and has more than doubled since then.

To accommodate the growing population, the Heiligkreuz church was built in 1964-1965 to replace a smaller previous church. It was built according to plans by architect Walter Moser and contains works of art by Max Rüedi and Alfred Huber.

== Geography ==
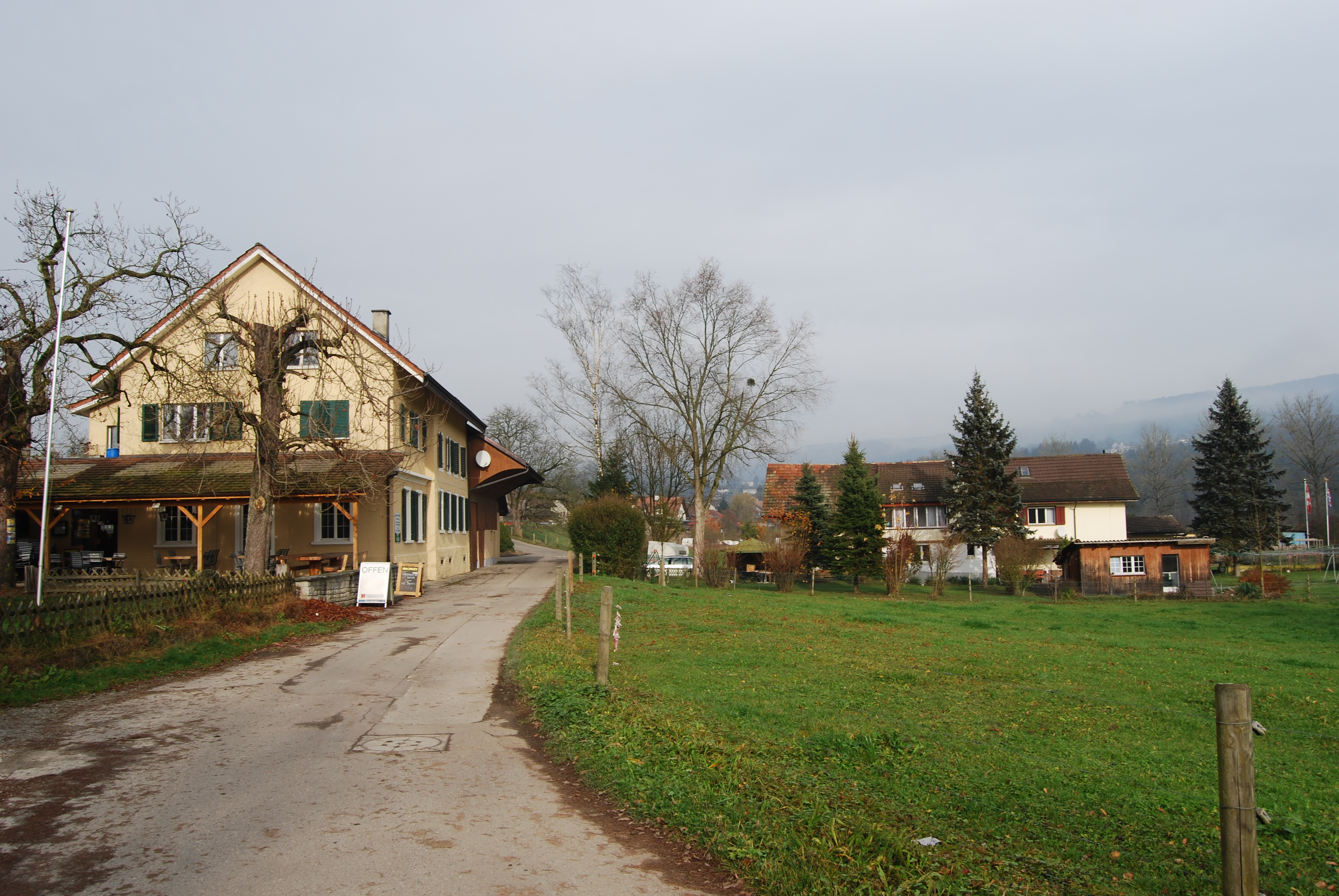
Village of Sulz in the municipality of Künten

Aerial view (1947)

Künten has an area, as of 2006, of 4.9 km^{2} (1.9 sq mi). Of this area, 56.3% is used for agricultural purposes, while 26.9% is forested. Of the rest of the land, 12.7% is settled (buildings or roads) and the remainder (4.1%) is non-productive (rivers or lakes).

The municipality is located in the Baden district. It consists of the village of Künten on the Bremgarten-Fislisbach road and the village of Sulz along the Reuss river valley.

== Coat of arms ==
The blazon of the municipal coat of arms is Per pale Argent a Latin Cross pattee couped and Gules a Bend Wavy Argent.

== Demographics ==
Künten has a population (as of 31 December 2020) of 1,838. As of 2008, 13.7% of the population was made up of foreign nationals. Over the last 10 years the population has grown at a rate of 5.7%. Most of the population (as of 2000) speaks German (93.1%), with Albanian being second most common ( 1.5%) and Turkish being third ( 0.9%).

The age distribution, as of 2008, in Künten is; 169 children or 10.5% of the population are between 0 and 9 years old and 210 teenagers or 13.0% are between 10 and 19. Of the adult population, 207 people or 12.8% of the population are between 20 and 29 years old. 210 people or 13.0% are between 30 and 39, 309 people or 19.1% are between 40 and 49, and 222 people or 13.7% are between 50 and 59. The senior population distribution is 167 people or 10.3% of the population are between 60 and 69 years old, 81 people or 5.0% are between 70 and 79, there are 36 people or 2.2% who are between 80 and 89, and there are 4 people or 0.2% who are 90 and older.

As of 2000, there were 34 homes with 1 or 2 persons in the household, 199 homes with 3 or 4 persons in the household, and 294 homes with 5 or more persons in the household. The average number of people per household was 2.71 individuals. In 2008 there were 316 single family homes (or 48.8% of the total) out of a total of 648 homes and apartments.

In the 2007 federal election the most popular party was the SVP which received 44.8% of the vote. The next three most popular parties were the CVP (20.6%), the FDP (10.7%) and the SP (10.5%).

The entire Swiss population is generally well educated. In Künten about 78.6% of the population (between age 25-64) have completed either non-mandatory upper secondary education or additional higher education (either university or a Fachhochschule). Of the school age population (in the 2008/2009 school year), there are 123 students attending primary school, there are 55 students attending secondary school in the municipality.

The historical population is given in the following table:

Historical population
Year	Pop.	±%
1850	609	—
1900	449	−26.3%
1950	574	+27.8%
2000	1,486	+158.9%

== Heritage sites of national significance ==
The mill at Mühlegasse 2 is listed as a Swiss heritage site of national significance.

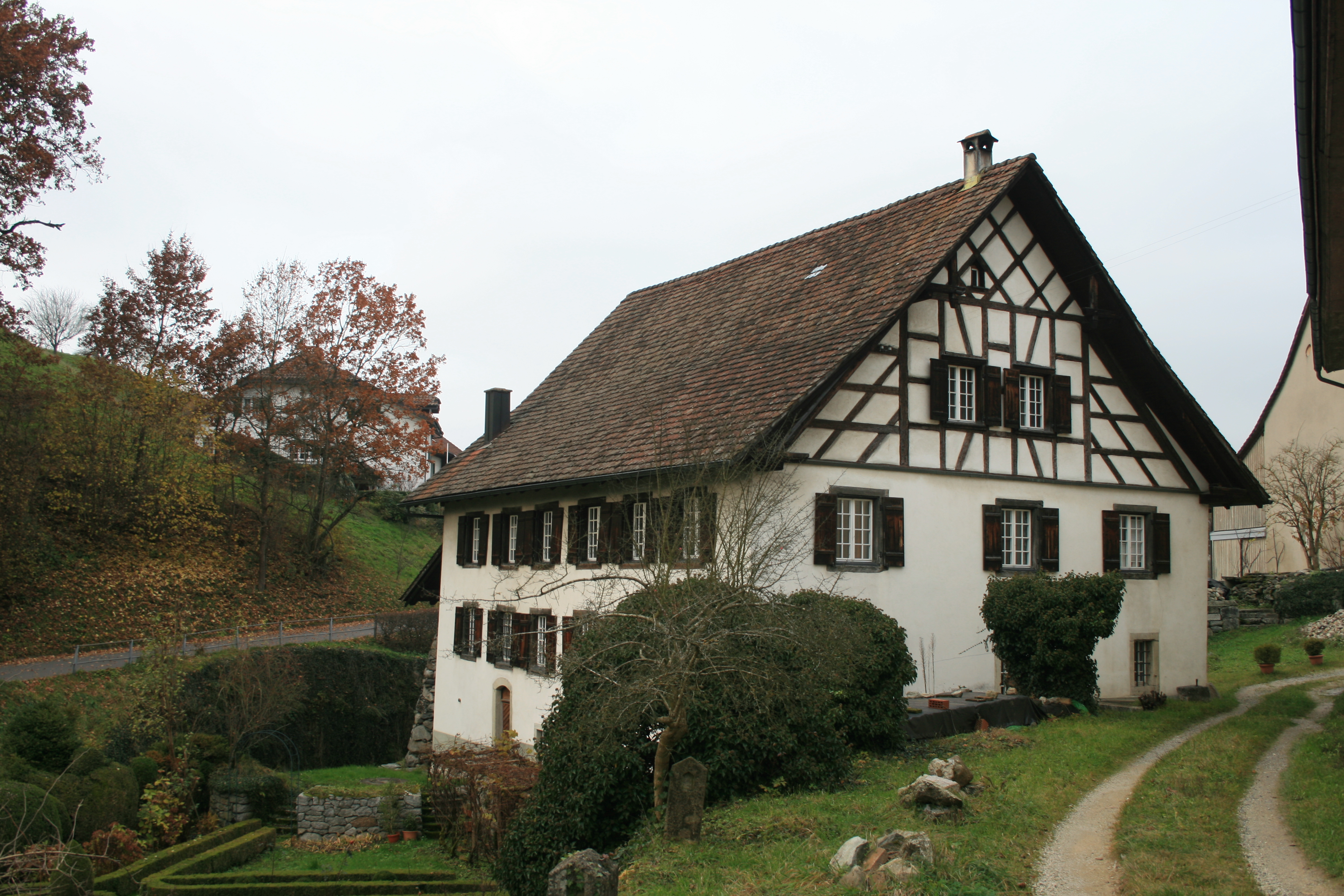
Building of the old Mill on Mühlegasse 2

== Economy ==
As of 2007, Künten had an unemployment rate of 1.33%. As of 2005, there were 48 people employed in the primary economic sector and about 17 businesses involved in this sector. 155 people are employed in the secondary sector and there are 14 businesses in this sector. 120 people are employed in the tertiary sector, with 37 businesses in this sector.

As of 2000 there was a total of 825 workers who lived in the municipality. Of these, 649 or about 78.7% of the residents worked outside Künten while 131 people commuted into the municipality for work. There were a total of 307 jobs (of at least 6 hours per week) in the municipality.

== Religion ==
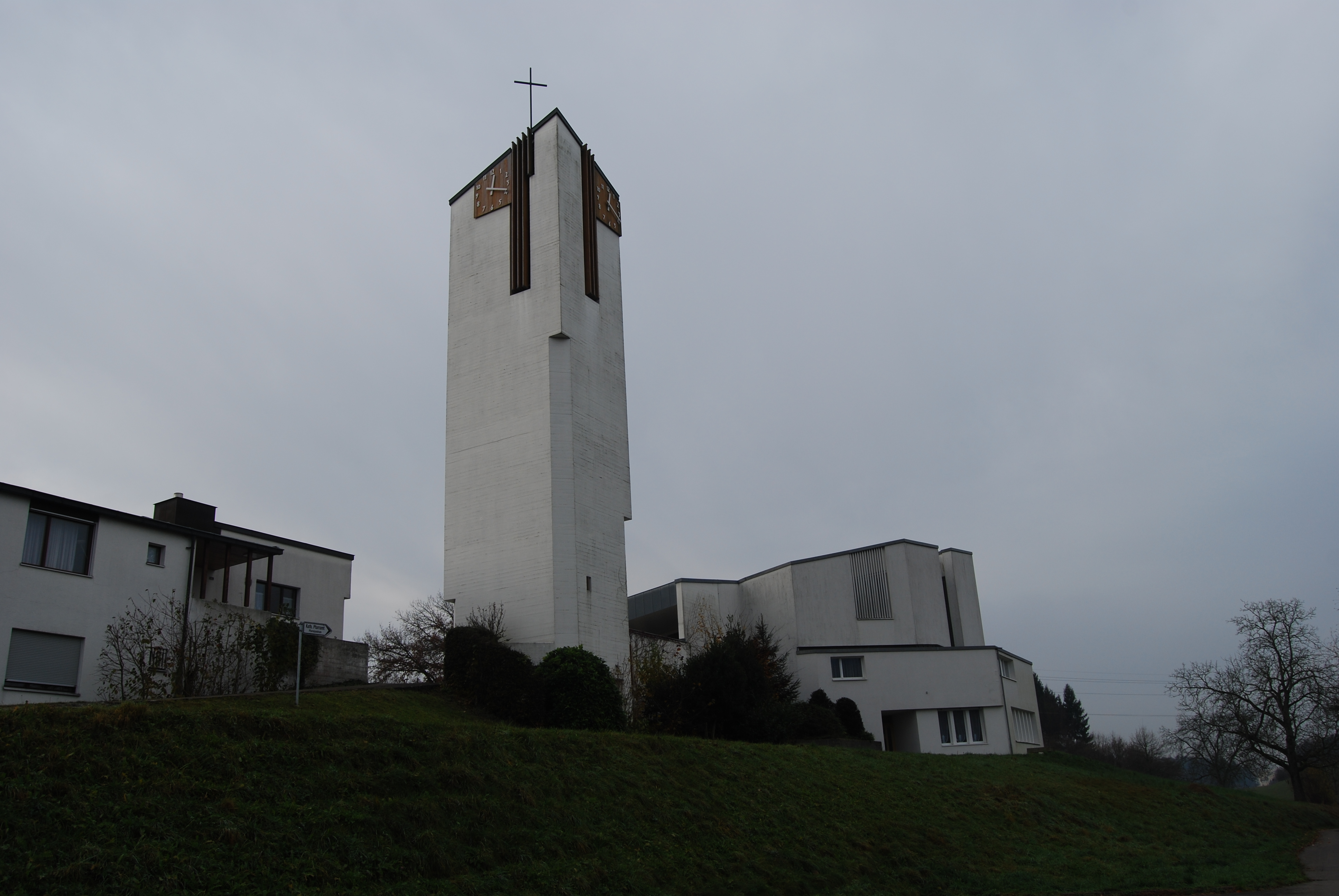
Roman Catholic Church of Künten

From the 2000 census, 891 or 60.0% are Roman Catholic, while 346 or 23.3% belonged to the Swiss Reformed Church. Of the rest of the population, there are 4 individuals (or about 0.27% of the population) who belong to the Christian Catholic faith.
