= County of Baden =

Condominium of the Old Swiss Confederacy

Coordinates: 47°28′N 8°18′E

County of Baden Grafschaft Baden
- 1415–1798
- Flag Coat of arms

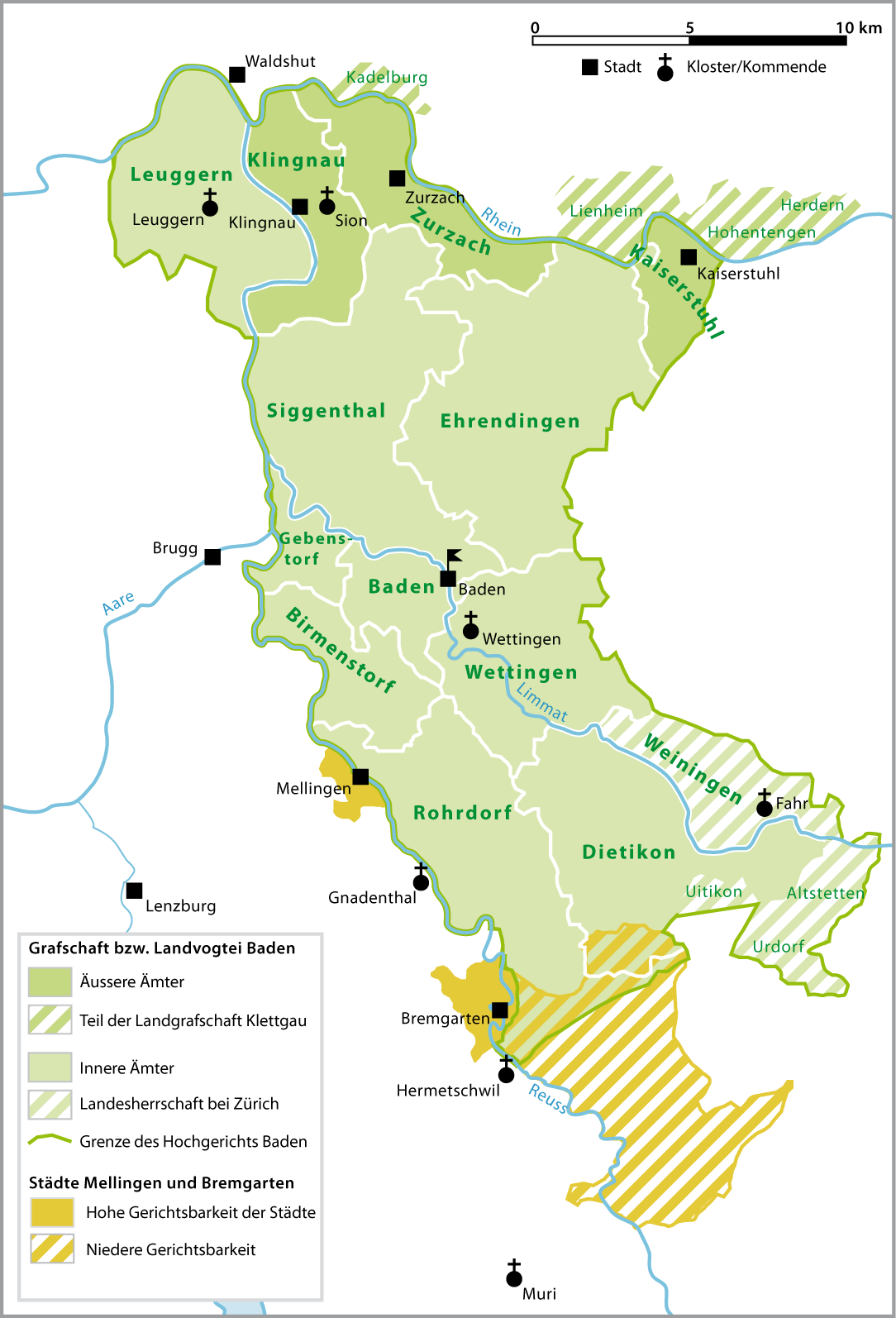
- County of Baden
- Status: Vassal of the Old Swiss Confederacy
- Capital: Baden
- Common languages: German
- Religion: Roman Catholic, Protestant
- Historical era: Middle Ages
  - Acquired by the Habsburgs: 1264
  - Established: 1415
  - Disestablished: 1798
Preceded by	Succeeded by
Habsburg, Switzerland	Canton of Baden

The County of Baden (German: Grafschaft Baden) was a condominium of the Old Swiss Confederacy and is now part of the Swiss canton of Aargau. The county was established in 1415 after the Swiss conquest of the Aargau and was ruled as a shared condominium until 1798 when it became part of the short-lived Canton of Baden.

== History ==
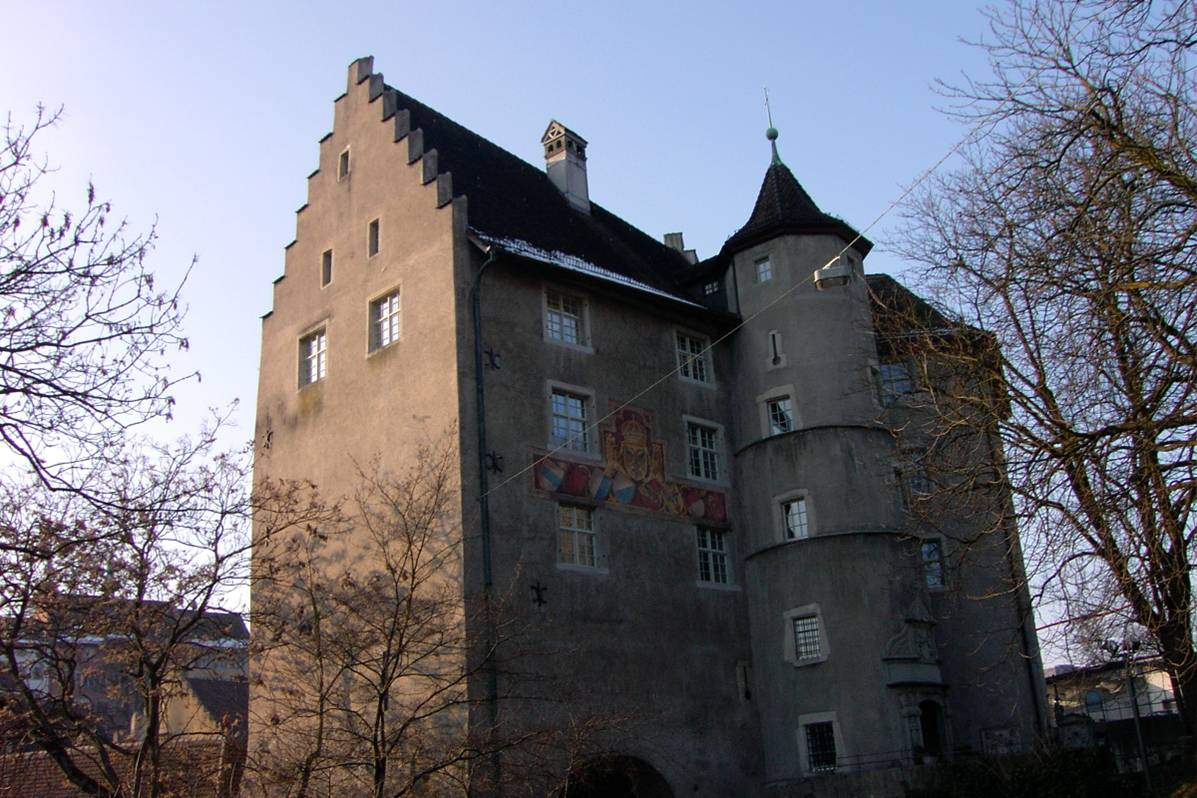
Governor's castle in Baden

The land that became the County of Baden was originally ruled by the Counts of Lenzburg. Once that family's main line died out, it came under the Kyburgs and then in 1264 the Habsburgs. The exact territories in the county changed often but originally included the western part of the Zürichgau and parts of the territory between the Rhine, Aare and Reuss rivers. In the 14th century, the territory of Baden became a triangle between the Limmat and Reuss rivers, though it was later divided further. As part of the Habsburg bailiwick of Aargau, it was managed by a bailiff, who had his seat in the town of Baden.

On 16 November 1414, Emperor Sigismund called the Council of Constance to settle the Western Schism between the three popes (Benedict XIII, Gregory XII, and John XXIII), all of whom claimed legitimacy. Frederick IV of Habsburg sided with John XXIII. When John XXIII was declared an antipope, he fled the city with Frederick's help. The emperor then declared the Habsburg lands forfeited and ordered the neighbouring countries to conquer those lands for the emperor. The city-state of Bern had already pledged their support of the emperor against the Habsburgs in 1414, and so they were ready to invade. The rest of the Confederation quickly followed.

The territory was quickly conquered in 1415 by the Confederation. Under Habsburg rule, Aargau was divided into multiple sections (German: Ämter), which were maintained under the Confederation. Bern, Lucerne and Zurich were each given a portion of the conquered region to administer. The Freie Ämter and the Amt of Baden were collectively administered as subject territories by the rest of the Confederation. Under the Confederation, the Amt of Baden became the County of Baden. The county included the former Ämter of Baden and Siggenthal, the Bishop of Constance's vogtei of Klingnau, Zurzach and Kaiserstuhl as well as the parish of Leuggern on the left side of the Aare.

Initially, ownership of the county was shared between the seven cantons which had participated in the invasion. Starting in 1443 this was expanded into all Eight Cantons or Acht Orte. It was divided into eight inner (Rohrdorf, Birmenstorf, Gebenstorf, Dietikon, Wettingen, Siggenthal, Ehrendingen, Leuggern) and three outer districts (Klingnau, Zurzach, Kaiserstuhl), which included the parishes of Kadelburg, Lienheim and Hohentengen on the right bank of the Rhine.

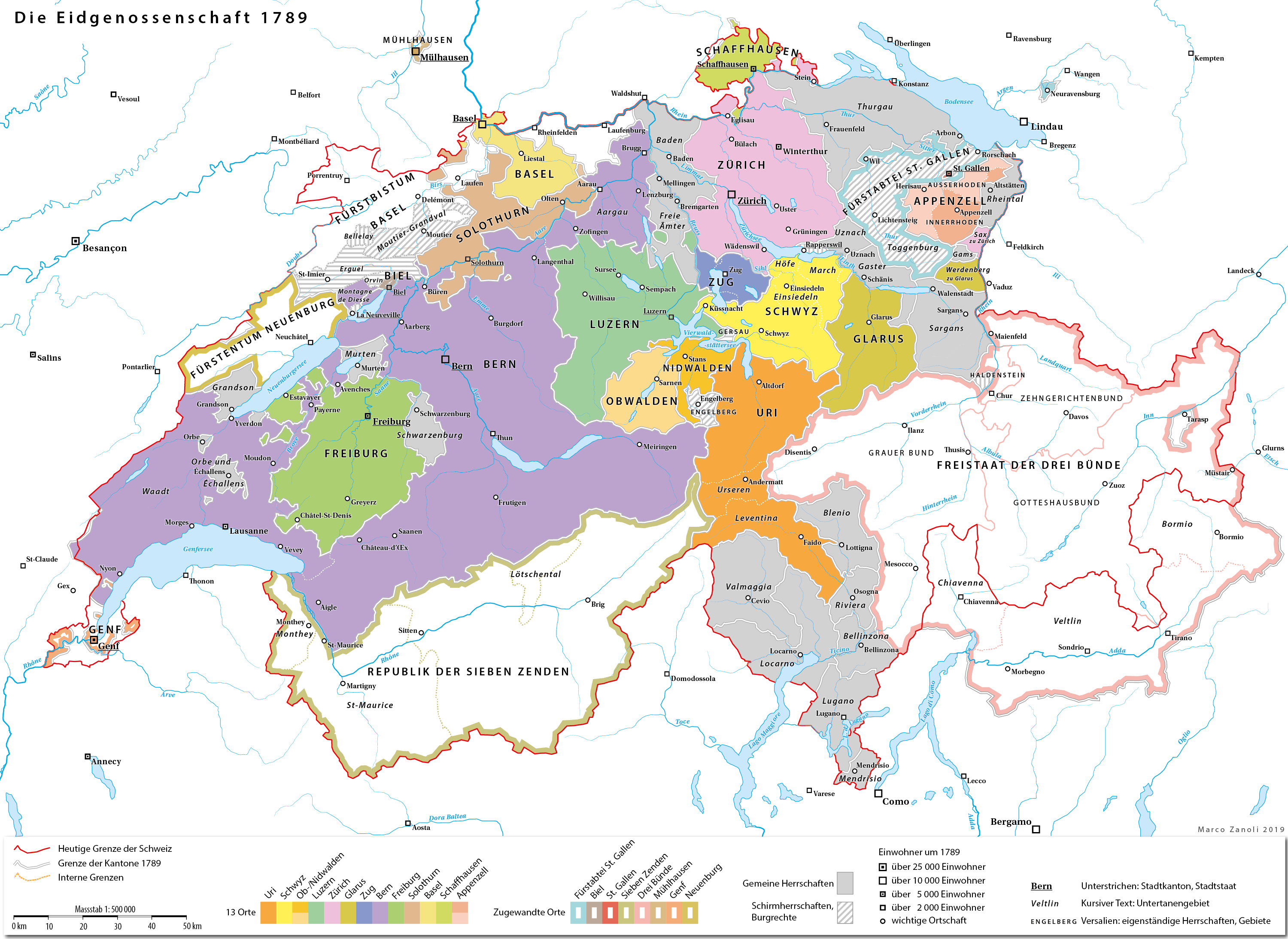
The Old Swiss Confederation, showing the situation of the county of Baden

The Confederates retained much of the Habsburg legal structure, which caused a number of problems. The local nobility had the right to hold the low court in only about one-fifth of the territory. There were over 30 different nobles who had the right to hold courts scattered around the surrounding lands. All these overlapping jurisdictions caused numerous conflicts, but gradually the Confederation was able to acquire these rights in the county. The cities of Baden, Bremgarten and Mellingen became the administrative centres and held the high courts. Together with the courts, the three administrative centres had considerable local autonomy but were ruled by a governor who was appointed by the Acht Orte every two years. After the Protestant victory at the Second Battle of Villmergen, the administration of the county changed slightly. Instead of the Acht Orte appointing a bailiff together, Zurich and Bern each appointed the governor for 7 out of 16 years while Glarus appointed him for the remaining 2 years.

The governor lived in the Landvogteischloss (Governor's Castle) in Baden, which was expanded in 1486–90. The governor had his own lower court and he was the appellate court for the local lords' courts. He appointed some of the local administrators and the high court judges at Baden. The governor cast the deciding vote in the event of a tie in the high court. Due to the limited jurisdiction and the short, two-year appointment, the governor's power was limited. The local courts and village mayors had quite a bit of autonomy.

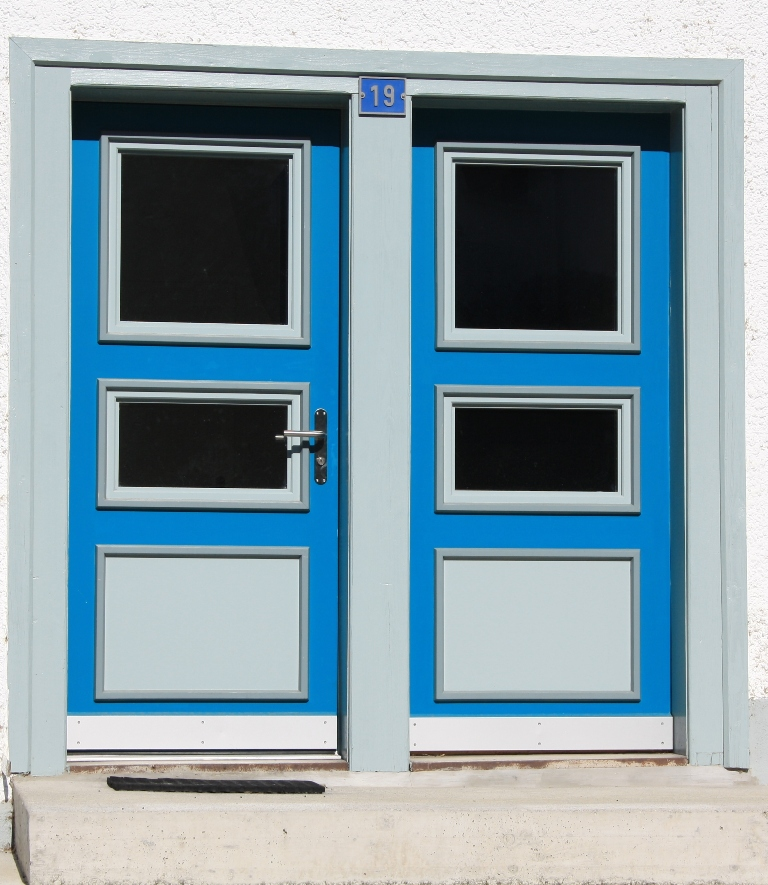
Two separate doors (one for Jews and one for Christians) on a house in Lengnau

The governor's income came from a death tax (converted in 1666 into an annual tax), a tax on people leaving the county, a tolerance tax on the Jews and customs fees. However, customs fees brought in so little that in the 17th century, the right to collect duties was auctioned off to the highest bidder. The county was the only federal condominium in the 17th century where Jews were tolerated. In 1774, they were restricted to just two towns: Endingen and Lengnau. While the rural upper class tried several times to finally expel the Jews, the financial interests of the authorities prevented this. The Jews were directly subordinate to the governor starting in 1696 when they were forced to buy a protecting and shielding letter every 16 years from the governor. The region was rarely profitable and being appointed a governor usually only resulted in modest wealth.

Until the 18th century, the vast majority of residents in the county lived off of agriculture. They mostly grew grain, but in the Limmat, Aare and Surb valleys there was some viticulture. Most of the county's market towns held only local markets, which, however, provided a solid income source for the increasingly degree-indebted county. The chaotic legal structure and fragmented land ownership combined with a tradition of dividing the land among all the heirs in an inheritance prevented any large-scale reforms. The governor tried in the 18th century to reform and standardize laws and ownership across the county, but with limited success. With an ever-changing administration, the county lacked a coherent long-term economic policy or support for reforms. By the end of the 18th century there were no factories or mills and only a few small cottage industries along the border with Zurich. Road construction first became a priority after 1750, when Zurich and Bern began appointing a governor for seven years.

During the Protestant Reformation, some of the municipalities converted to the new faith. However, starting in 1531, some of the old parishes were converted back to the old faith. The governors were appointed from both Catholic and Protestant cantons and since they changed every two years, neither faith gained a majority in the county. The towns of Tegerfelden and Zurzach had a large Reformed majority, while many other towns had a strong minority. The Reformed parishes were under the authority of the ecclesiastical court in Zurich, except for Birmenstorf and Gebenstorf which were under the Bernese court. The Jews of the Surbtal formed a Beth din or a rabbinical court with Tiengen. In the 18th century, they built two large synagogues.

== History since 1798 ==
=== Canton ===
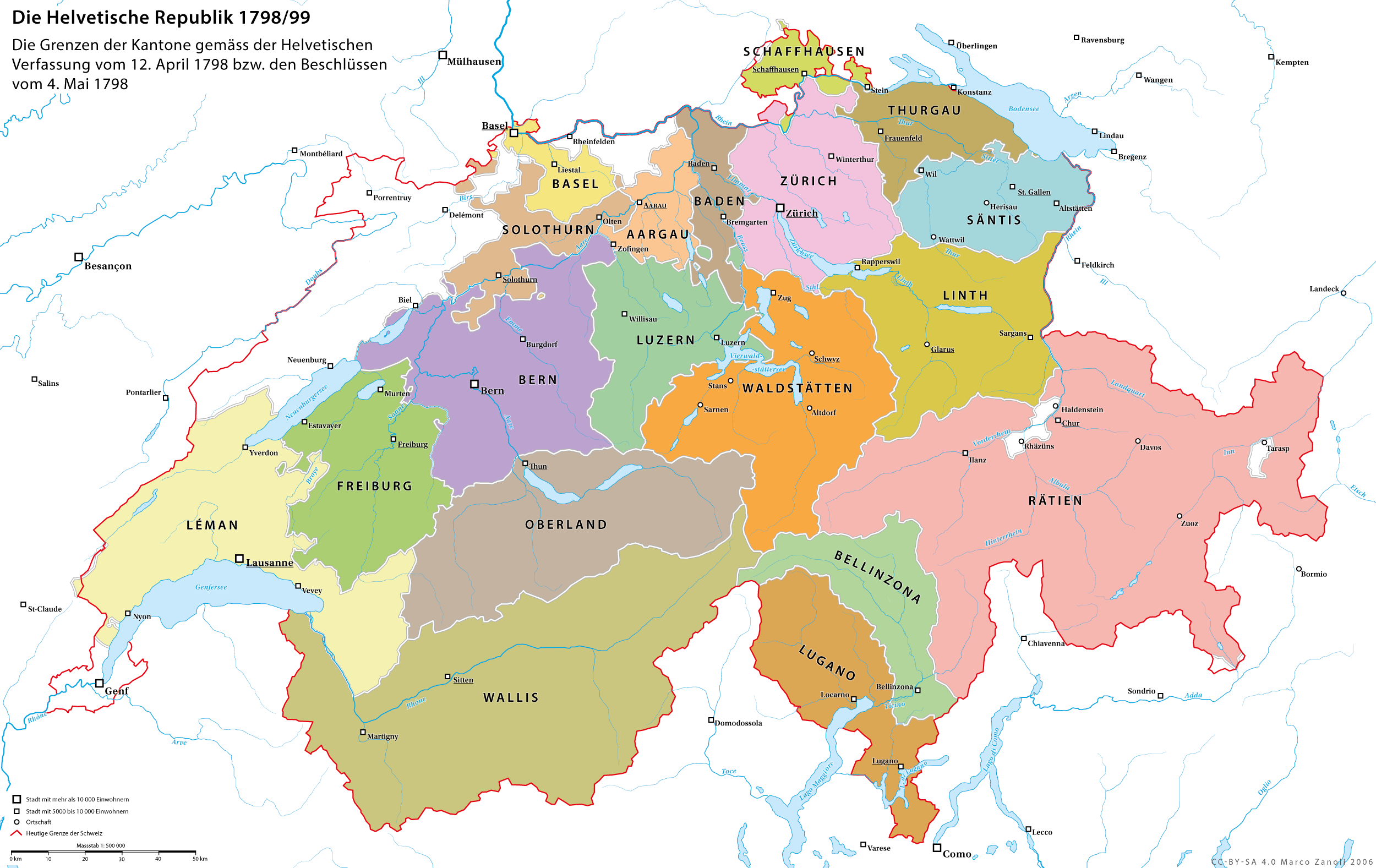
Map of the Helvetic Republic in 1798/99 with the Canton of Baden

The County of Baden was dissolved after the 1798 French invasion. On 19 March 1798, the governments of Zurich and Bern agreed to the creation of the short-lived Canton of Baden in the Helvetic Republic. With the Act of Mediation in 1803, the Canton of Baden was dissolved, becoming part of Aargau.

=== District ===
Portions of the lands of the former County of Baden became the District of Baden, firstly in the Canton of Baden and then in the Canton of Aargau (from 1803).

Upon the merging of the canton of Baden into Aargau in 1803, the district gained the municipalities of Würenlingen, Bellikon, Künten, Remetschwil, Stetten, Mellingen, Wohlenschwil and Mägenwil (from neighbouring districts of the canton of Baden) but had to give up Hüttikon, Oetwil an der Limmat, Dietikon and Schlieren to the Canton of Zurich.

After World War II, this formerly agrarian region saw striking growth and became the district with the largest and densest population in the canton (110,000 in 1990, 715 persons per km2).
