= Johann Amstein =

Landammann of Obwalden (died c. 1547)

- Died: c. 1547
- Title: Landammann of Obwalden
- Term: 1526, 1530, 1533, 1536, 1540, 1544
- Spouses: Barbara Zelger; Katharina Omlin

Johann Amstein (died around 1547) was Landammann (chief magistrate) of Obwalden in 1526, 1530, 1533, 1536, 1540, and 1544. Between 1521 and 1541 he was an envoy to the Federal Diet (Tagsatzung) more than forty times.

== Biography ==
Johann Amstein was presumably the last member of an Obwalden family from Alpnach (the von Wolfenschiessen family). He married first Barbara Zelger, probably a sister of the Nidwalden Landammann Marquard Zelger, and second Katharina Omlin.

Between 1521 and 1541 Amstein was an envoy to the Federal Diet more than forty times. He was Landammann of Obwalden in 1526, 1530, 1533, 1536, 1540, and 1544, and a member of the Court of Fifteen (Fünfzehnergericht) in 1531, 1534, and 1541. He was an envoy at the conclusion of the alliance of the five inner cantons with the future King Ferdinand I in 1529, and for the peace with Zurich after the Second War of Kappel in 1531.

== Bibliography ==
- E. Omlin, Die Landammänner des Standes Obwalden und ihre Wappen, 1966, 110–111

=== Sources ===
- R. Küchler, "Das Protokoll des Fünfzehnergerichts Obwalden 1529–1549, 2 Teile", in Der Geschichtsfreund, 146, 1993, 151–390; 147, 1994, 93–337 (index in part 2)
