= Thomas Zelger =

Landammann of Nidwalden (died 1422)

- Died: 30 June 1422 near Arbedo
- Title: Landammann of Nidwalden
- Term: 1420
- Parents: Marquard Zelger (father); Ida Berlinger (mother)

Thomas Zelger (first mentioned 1418; died 30 June 1422) was Landammann (chief magistrate) of Nidwalden in 1420. He was killed in the Battle of Arbedo in 1422.

== Biography ==
Thomas Zelger was the son of Marquard Zelger and Ida Berlinger. He was the father of Marquard Zelger.

In 1418 Zelger was an envoy to the Federal Diet (Tagsatzung), and in 1420 he was Landammann of Nidwalden. During the Appenzell Wars, in 1420, he took part in the mediation by the Confederates between the Prince-Abbey of St. Gall and Appenzell. In 1422 he was a witness when the people of the Engelberg valley bought their release from the monastery's right of inheritance. Like his brother Jenni, he was killed in the Battle of Arbedo in 1422.

== Bibliography ==
- F. Zelger, Chronik und Genealogie der Zelger aus Unterwalden und von Luzern, 1933, 33–34
- G. Heer, Aus der Vergangenheit von Kloster und Tal Engelberg 1120–1970, 1975, 126–127
