= Niklaus von Zuben =

Landammann of Obwalden (15th century)

- Died: c. 1494/1495
- Title: Landammann of Obwalden
- Term: 1480, 1488, 1494

Niklaus von Zuben (died probably around 1494/1495) was Landammann (chief magistrate) of Obwalden in 1480, 1488, and 1494. Between 1473 and 1489 he was Obwalden's envoy to the Federal Diet (Tagsatzung) more than 50 times.

== Biography ==
Niklaus von Zuben's daughter Elsi married Heinrich Zelger.

From 1470 to 1472 von Zuben was bailiff (Landvogt) of Sargans. Between 1473 and 1489 he was Obwalden's envoy to the Federal Diet more than 50 times. In 1478 he was captain of Unterwalden, and in the same year he was a member of the embassy of the Confederates to King Louis XI of France. In 1478 and 1486 he represented the parishioners of Alpnach before the Obwalden Court of Fifteen (Fünfzehnergericht). He was the governing Landammann in 1480, 1488, and 1494.

== Bibliography ==
- E. Omlin, Die Landammänner des Standes Obwalden und ihre Wappen, 1966, 99, 224
