= Ludwig Zelger =

Landammann of Nidwalden (died 1557)

- Died: before 26 December 1557
- Title: Landammann of Nidwalden
- Term: 1548
- Spouse: Barbara Omlin
- Parents: Marquard Zelger (father); Elsi zun Höffen (mother)

Ludwig Zelger (first mentioned 1540 in Kerns; died before 26 December 1557) was Landammann (chief magistrate) of Nidwalden in 1548. As a captain in French service he took part in the unsuccessful siege of Perpignan in 1542, and in 1557 he suffered a defeat in the Battle of Saint-Quentin.

== Biography ==
Ludwig Zelger was the son of Marquard Zelger and Elsi zun Höffen. He married Barbara Omlin.

Zelger was a landowner, and from 1546 at the latest he was banneret (Bannerherr) of Nidwalden. After he had traveled to Lucerne in 1546 with the treasurer (Säckelmeister) Melchior Stulz to receive "miner herren gelt" ("my lords' money"), probably French pensions, he was fined 100 pounds for breach of the peace. In 1548 he took part in the treaty between Nidwalden and Obwalden concerning representation at the Federal Diet (Tagsatzung), and in the same year he was Landammann of Nidwalden. As a captain in French service he took part in the unsuccessful siege of Perpignan in 1542, and in 1557 he suffered a defeat in the Battle of Saint-Quentin.

== Bibliography ==
- F. Zelger, Chronik und Genealogie der Zelger aus Unterwalden und von Luzern, 1933, 44
