= Heinrich Zelger =

Landammann of Nidwalden (died 1481)

- Died: 1481
- Title: Landammann of Nidwalden
- Term: from 1480
- Spouse: Elsi von Zuben
- Father: Marquard Zelger

Heinrich Zelger (first mentioned 1473; died 1481) was Landammann (chief magistrate) of Nidwalden from 1480. In 1478 he took part in the conclusion of peace after the Burgundian Wars.

== Biography ==
Heinrich Zelger was the son of Marquard Zelger and the brother of Marquard Zelger. He married Elsi von Zuben, daughter of Niklaus von Zuben.

In 1473 Zelger was an envoy to the Federal Diet (Tagsatzung) in St. Gallen. In 1478 he took part in the conclusion of peace after the Burgundian Wars and began to receive a pension from Archduke Sigismund of Habsburg, which may explain Nidwalden's opposition to the recruitment of mercenaries by France. From 1480 he was Landammann of Nidwalden. He was repeatedly an envoy to the Federal Diet.

== Bibliography ==
- F. Zelger, Chronik und Genealogie der Zelger aus Unterwalden und von Luzern, 1933, 36–37 (copy in the Staatsarchiv Nidwalden with a correction of the family tree by R. Durrer)
