= Marquard Zelger (politician, died 1443) =

Landammann of Nidwalden (died 1443)

- Died: 25 May 1443
- Title: Landammann of Nidwalden
- Term: 1428, 1430, 1433, 1438
- Spouse: Margret Zniderist
- Father: Thomas Zelger

Marquard Zelger (first mentioned 1428; died 25 May 1443) was Landammann (chief magistrate) of Nidwalden, mentioned in that office in 1428, 1430, 1433, and 1438. He died in the Old Zurich War as captain of the Nidwalden troops.

== Biography ==
Marquard Zelger was the son of Thomas Zelger. He married Margret Zniderist. He was the father of Marquard and Heinrich Zelger.

Zelger is mentioned as Landammann in 1428, 1430, 1433, and 1438. In 1435 he became the first person from Nidwalden to be bailiff (Landvogt) of Baden. In February 1441 he was an envoy to the Federal Diet (Tagsatzung) in Lucerne, which mediated between Zurich on one side and Schwyz and Glarus on the other. He died in 1443 as captain of the Nidwalden troops in the Battle of Hirzel during the Old Zurich War.

== Bibliography ==
- K. von Deschwanden, "Urkundliches Verzeichniss der Landammänner, Vorgesetzten und Amtsleute des Landes Unterwalden nid dem Wald", in Der Geschichtsfreund, 26, 1871, 29–31
- F. Zelger, Chronik und Genealogie der Zelger aus Unterwalden und von Luzern, 1933, 34–35
