= Marquard Zelger (politician, died 1510) =

Landammann of Nidwalden (died 1510)

- Died: 1510
- Title: Landammann of Nidwalden
- Term: 1492, 1493, 1496, 1506, 1508
- Spouse: Richi am Stein
- Father: Marquard Zelger

Marquard Zelger (first mentioned 1470; died 1510) was Landammann (chief magistrate) of Nidwalden, recorded in that office in 1492, 1493, 1496, 1506, and 1508. During the Burgundian Wars he was a mercenary and mercenary leader in the service of the prince-bishop of Basel.

== Biography ==
Marquard Zelger was the son of Marquard Zelger and the brother of Heinrich Zelger. He married Richi am Stein. His daughter Margret married Heinrich von Matt in 1505.

Because of a marriage dispute concerning his cousin Margret Zelger, Zelger left Nidwalden, and in 1474 he became a citizen of Lucerne. During the Burgundian Wars of 1474–1477 he served the prince-bishop of Basel as a mercenary and mercenary leader. In 1479, after the marriage affair had been settled, he returned to Buochs. From 1484 he was repeatedly an envoy to the Federal Diet (Tagsatzung), and around 1486 he was treasurer (Landsäckelmeister). He is recorded as Landammann of Nidwalden in 1492, 1493, 1496, 1506, and 1508. In 1501, in Basel, where he was possibly a participant in the swearing of the alliance (Bundesschwur), he was declared innocent of a homicide committed earlier. In 1510 he and his son Marquard renounced their citizenship of Lucerne.

== Bibliography ==
- K. von Deschwanden, "Urkundliches Verzeichniss der Landammänner, Vorgesetzten und Amtsleute des Landes Unterwalden nid dem Wald", in Der Geschichtsfreund, 26, 1871, 49–59
- F. Zelger, Chronik und Genealogie der Zelger aus Unterwalden und von Luzern, 1933, 39–41 (copy in the Staatsarchiv Nidwalden with a correction of the family tree by R. Durrer)
