= Niederrohrdorf =

- Municipality
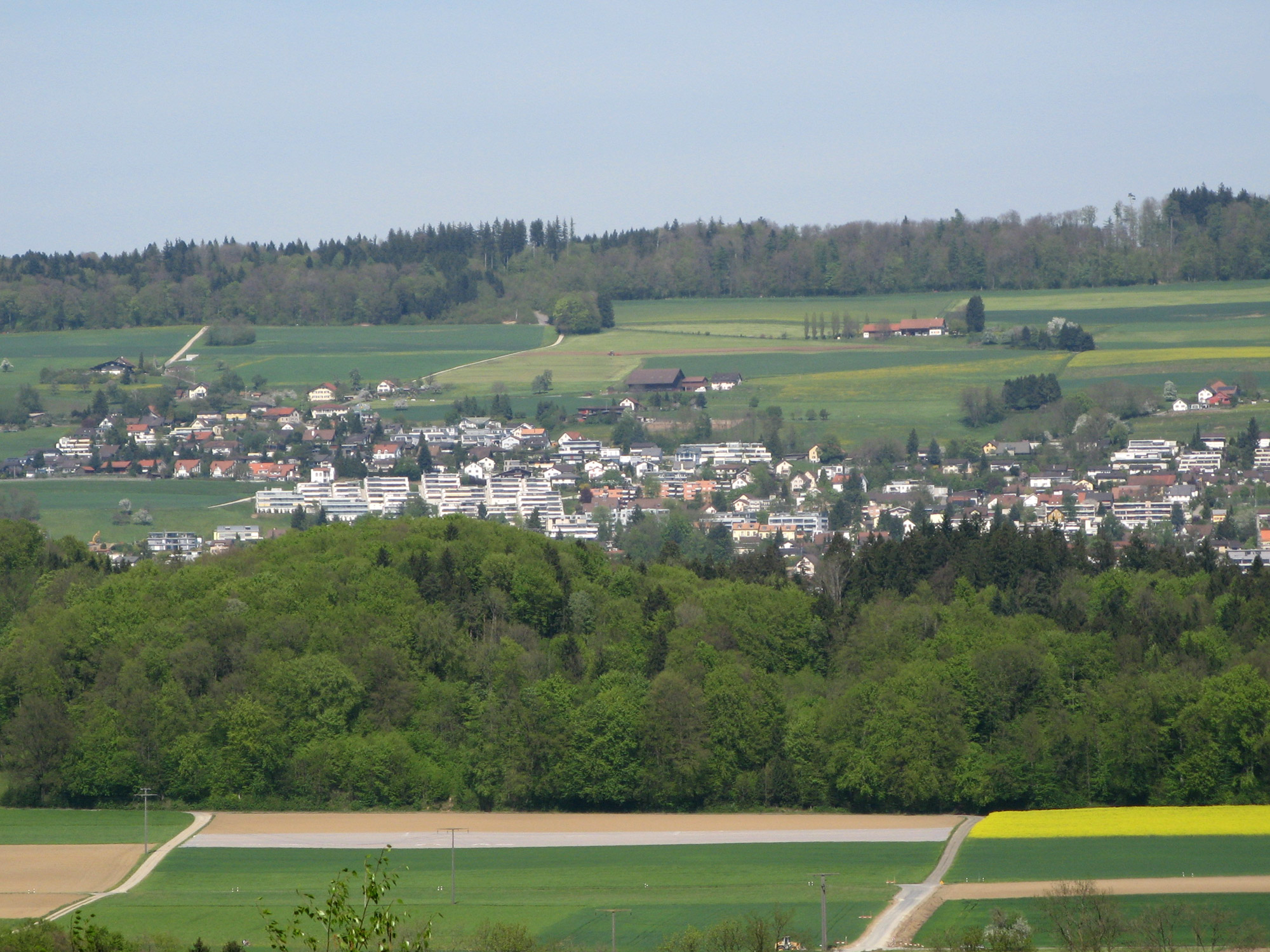

- Flag Coat of arms
- Location of Niederrohrdorf
- Location within Switzerland Location within Canton of Aargau
- Coordinates: 47°25′N 8°19′E
- Country: Switzerland
- Canton: Aargau
- District: Baden

Area
  - Total: 3.33 km^{2} (1.29 sq mi)
- Elevation: 436 m (1,430 ft)

Population (December 2020)
  - Total: 4,225
  - Density: 1,270/km^{2} (3,290/sq mi)
- Time zone: UTC+01:00 (CET)
  - Summer (DST): UTC+02:00 (CEST)
- Postal code: 5443
- SFOS number: 4035
- ISO 3166 code: CH-AG
- Surrounded by: Fislisbach, Mellingen, Oberrohrdorf, Remetschwil, Stetten
- Website: niederrohrdorf.ch

Niederrohrdorf is a municipality in the district of Baden in the canton of Aargau in Switzerland.

== History ==
Niederrohrdorf is first mentioned in 1179 as Rordorf. In 1275 it was mentioned as Nidern Rordorf. In 1854 the municipality of Rohrdorf split into Niederrohrdorf, Oberrohrdorf and Remetschwil.

== Geography ==
Aerial view from 300 m by Walter Mittelholzer (1920)

Niederrohrdorf has an area, as of 2006, of 3.3 km^{2} (1.3 sq mi). Of this area, 45% is used for agricultural purposes, while 29.6% is forested. Of the rest of the land, 24.5% is settled (buildings or roads) and the remainder (0.9%) is non-productive (rivers or lakes).

The municipality is located in the Baden district, on the western foot of the Heitersberg in an ecologically important moorland. It consists of the village of Niederrohrdorf and the hamlets of Holzrüti and Vogelrüti as well as scattered farm houses.

== Coat of arms ==
The blazon of the municipal coat of arms is Gules on a Mount Vert a Lamb passant holding a Flag Argent a Cross Gules on a staff Or.

== Demographics ==
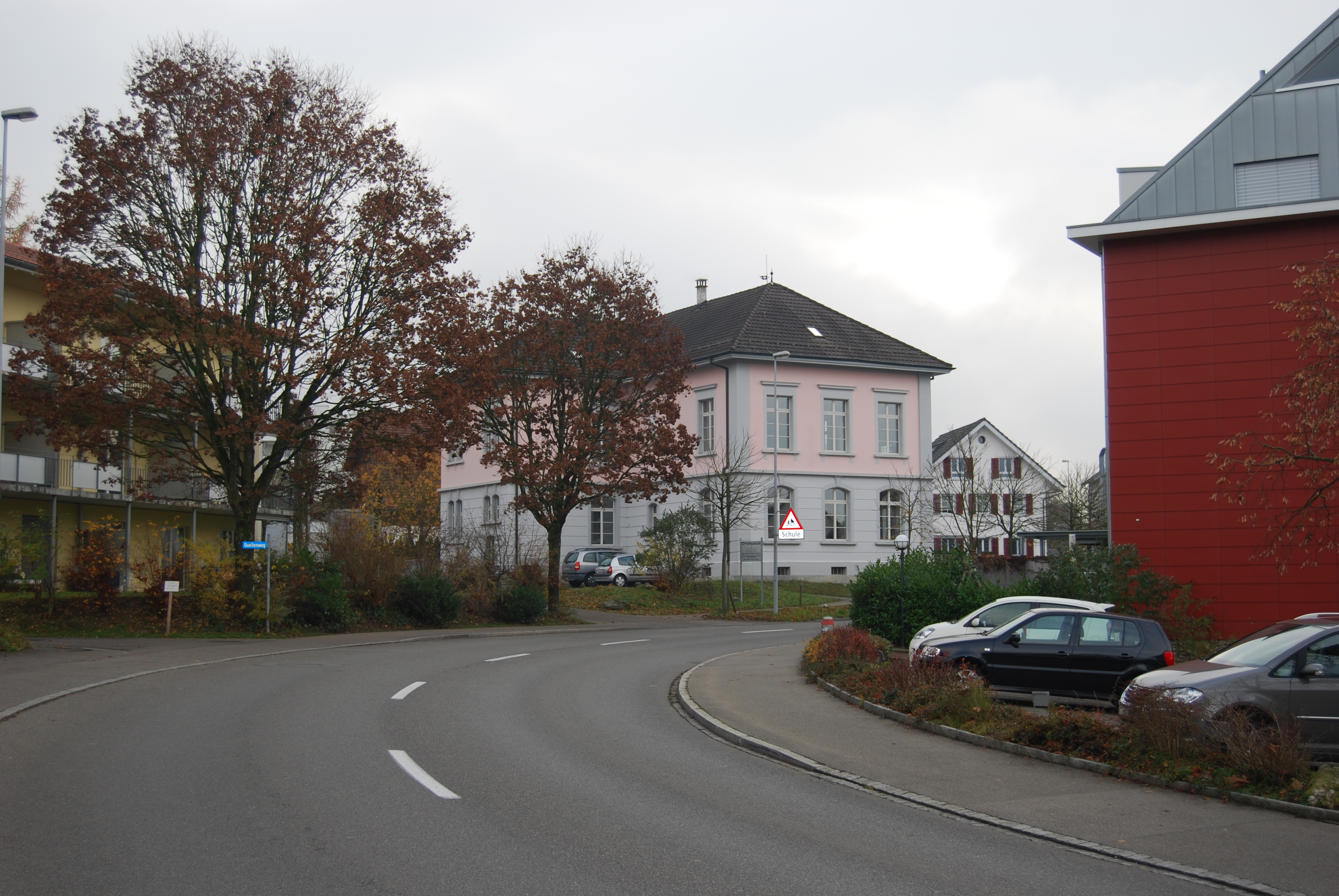
Village school

Niederrohrdorf has a population (as of 31 December 2020) of 4,225. As of 2008, 18.1% of the population was made up of foreign nationals. Over the last 10 years the population has grown at a rate of 19.8%. Most of the population (as of 2000) speaks German (89.1%), with Italian being second most common ( 2.5%) and Turkish being third ( 1.3%).

The age distribution, as of 2008, in Niederrohrdorf is; 324 children or 9.9% of the population are between 0 and 9 years old and 327 teenagers or 10.0% are between 10 and 19. Of the adult population, 432 people or 13.2% of the population are between 20 and 29 years old. 540 people or 16.5% are between 30 and 39, 504 people or 15.4% are between 40 and 49, and 471 people or 14.4% are between 50 and 59. The senior population distribution is 356 people or 10.8% of the population are between 60 and 69 years old, 233 people or 7.1% are between 70 and 79, there are 86 people or 2.6% who are between 80 and 89, and there are 9 people or 0.3% who are 90 and older.

As of 2000, there were 64 homes with 1 or 2 persons in the household, 491 homes with 3 or 4 persons in the household, and 417 homes with 5 or more persons in the household. The average number of people per household was 2.45 individuals. In 2008 there were 519 single family homes (or 34.5% of the total) out of a total of 1,503 homes and apartments.

In the 2007 federal election the most popular party was the SVP which received 36.4% of the vote. The next three most popular parties were the FDP (17.3%), the CVP (15.8%) and the SP (15.4%).

In Niederrohrdorf about 81% of the population (between age 25–64) have completed either non-mandatory upper secondary education or additional higher education (either university or a Fachhochschule). Of the school age population (in the 2008/2009 school year), there are 199 students attending primary school, there are 126 students attending secondary school in the municipality.

The historical population is given in the following table:

Historical population
Year	Pop.	±%
1780	255	—
1803	396	+55.3%
1900	631	+59.3%
1950	1,074	+70.2%
2000	2,443	+127.5%

== Economy ==
As of 2007, Niederrohrdorf had an unemployment rate of 2.17%. As of 2005, there were 57 people employed in the primary economic sector and about 15 businesses involved in this sector. 350 people are employed in the secondary sector and there are 32 businesses in this sector. 323 people are employed in the tertiary sector, with 81 businesses in this sector.

As of 2000 there were 1,298 total workers who lived in the municipality. Of these, 1,044 or about 80.4% of the residents worked outside Niederrohrdorf while 438 people commuted into the municipality for work. There were a total of 692 jobs (of at least 6 hours per week) in the municipality.

== Religion ==
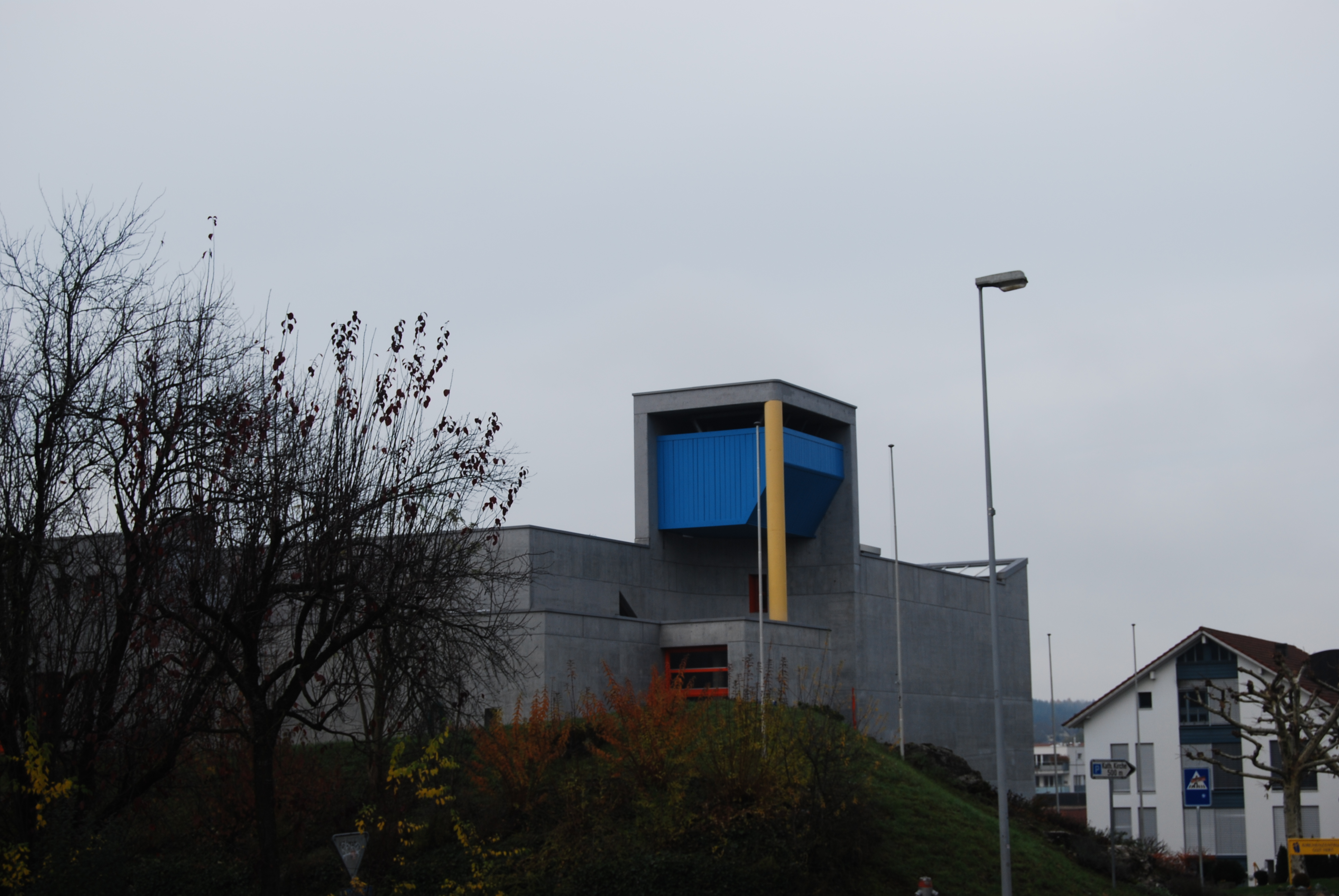
Church center Gut Hirt at Niederrohrdorf

From the 2000 census, 1,251 or 51.2% are Roman Catholic, while 662 or 27.1% belonged to the Swiss Reformed Church. Of the rest of the population, there are 17 individuals (or about 0.70% of the population) who belong to the Christian Catholic faith.
