= Baden District, Aargau =

Coordinates: 47°28′N 8°18′E

Bezirk Baden Baden District
- District
- Country: Switzerland
- Canton: Aargau
- Capital: Baden

Area
  - Total: 153.07 km^{2} (59.10 sq mi)

Population (2020)
  - Total: 146,064
  - Density: 954.23/km^{2} (2,471.4/sq mi)
- Time zone: UTC+1 (CET)
  - Summer (DST): UTC+2 (CEST)
- Municipalities: 25

Baden District is a district in the canton of Aargau, Switzerland. The district capital is the town of Baden and the largest municipality is Wettingen, located in the Limmat Valley (German: Limmattal). The district has a total of 25 municipalities, an area of 153.07 km^{2} (59.10 sq mi), and a population (as of 2014) of about 138,000.

== Geography ==
Baden District has an area, as of 1997, of 153.09 km^{2} (59.11 sq mi). Of this area, 37.1% is used for agricultural purposes, while 38.5% is forested. The rest of the land, (22.4%) is settled.

== History ==
The district is descended from the historic County of Baden, which was dissolved in 1798 upon the creation of the short-lived Canton of Baden (1798–1803). The first district of Baden existed during the existence of that canton, covering part of the former county, and upon its merging into the canton of Aargau, the contemporary district was formed.

Upon the merging of the canton of Baden into Aargau in 1803, the district gained the municipalities of Würenlingen, Bellikon, Künten, Remetschwil, Stetten, Mellingen, Wohlenschwil and Mägenwil (from neighbouring districts of the canton of Baden) but had to give up Hüttikon, Oetwil an der Limmat, Dietikon and Schlieren to the Canton of Zurich.

== Demographics ==
Baden District has a population of 146,064 (as of 31 December 2020).

As of 2000, there were 6,801 homes with 1 or 2 persons in the household, 26,662 homes with 3 or 4 persons in the household, and 15,363 homes with 5 or more persons in the household. The average number of people per household was 2.28 individuals. In 2008 there were 16,394 single family homes (or 27.4% of the total) out of a total of 59,766 homes and apartments.

Of the school age population (in the 2008/2009 school year), there are 8,595 students attending primary school, there are 3,206 students attending secondary school, there are 1,949 students attending tertiary or university level schooling, there are 25 students who are seeking a job after school in the municipality.

== Economy ==
As of 2000 there were 63,243 residents who worked in the district, while 48,284 residents worked outside the district and 36,923 people commuted into the district for work.

== Religion ==
From the 2000 census, 54,408 or 46.7% are Roman Catholic, while 32,482 or 27.9% belonged to the Swiss Reformed Church. Of the rest of the population, there are 207 individuals (or about 0.18% of the population) who belong to the Christian Catholic faith.

== Municipalities ==
Coat of arms	Name	Population (31 December 2020)	Area in km²
Baden	Baden	19,621	14.72
Bellikon	Bellikon	1,544	4.94
Bergdietikon	Bergdietikon	2,909	5.94
Birmenstorf	Birmenstorf	2,962	7.80
Ehrendingen	Ehrendingen	4,880	7.31
Ennetbaden	Ennetbaden	3,486	2.11
Fislisbach	Fislisbach	5,578	5.05
Freienwil	Freienwil	1,110	3.99
Gebenstorf	Gebenstorf	5,514	5.64
Killwangen	Killwangen	2,051	2.43
Künten	Künten	1,838	4.89
Mägenwil	Mägenwil	2,139	3.48
Mellingen	Mellingen	5,865	4.86
Neuenhof	Neuenhof	8,954	5.37
Niederrohrdorf	Niederrohrdorf	4,225	3.33
Oberrohrdorf	Oberrohrdorf	4,037	4.30
Obersiggenthal	Obersiggenthal	8,661	8.36
Remetschwil	Remetschwil	2,023	3.88
Spreitenbach	Spreitenbach	12,126	8.60
Stetten	Stetten	2,224	4.41
Untersiggenthal	Untersiggenthal	7,229	8.28
Wettingen	Wettingen	21,099	10.59
Wohlenschwil	Wohlenschwil	1,677	4.39
Würenlingen	Würenlingen	4,838	9.37
Würenlos	Würenlos	6,511	9.03
	Total	146,064	153.07

=== Mergers ===
The following changes to the district's municipalities have occurred since 2000:

- 2006: Oberehrendingen and Unterehrendingen combined to create Ehrendingen
- 2024: Turgi was merged into Baden
