= Marquard Zelger (politician, died 1535) =

Landammann of Nidwalden (died 1535)

- Died: 1535
- Title: Landammann of Nidwalden
- Term: 1521, 1524, 1526, 1528
- Spouses: Ita Gruber; Anni am Stein; Elsi zun Höffen; Elsi von Büren; Wiborad Wichbalmer
- Father: Marquard Zelger

Marquard Zelger (first mentioned 1510; died 1535) was Landammann (chief magistrate) of Nidwalden in 1521, 1524, 1526, and 1528. In the Second War of Kappel in 1531 he led the vanguard.

== Biography ==
Marquard Zelger was the son of Marquard Zelger and probably the brother-in-law of Johann Amstein. He married five times; his wives were, in order, Ita Gruber, Anni am Stein, Elsi zun Höffen, Elsi von Büren, and Wiborad Wichbalmer. Ludwig Zelger was his son with Elsi zun Höffen.

In 1510 Zelger and his father renounced their citizenship of Lucerne. In 1517 he served as an envoy of Nidwalden for the first time. In 1521, as Landammann, he took part in the alliance with France; in 1541 a court rejected the accusation of corruption connected with it. Zelger was Landammann again in 1524, 1526, and 1528, and from 1521 to 1528 he was Nidwalden's most frequent envoy to the Federal Diet (Tagsatzung). In 1530 he was one of the mediators of the peace between Bern and Savoy. He contributed significantly to the decision to go to war against the Reformed cantons. In the Second War of Kappel in 1531 he led the vanguard. From 1533 to 1535 he served as a judge.

== Bibliography ==
- F. Zelger, Chronik und Genealogie der Zelger aus Unterwalden und von Luzern, 1933, 42–43
