= Oberrohrdorf =

- Municipality
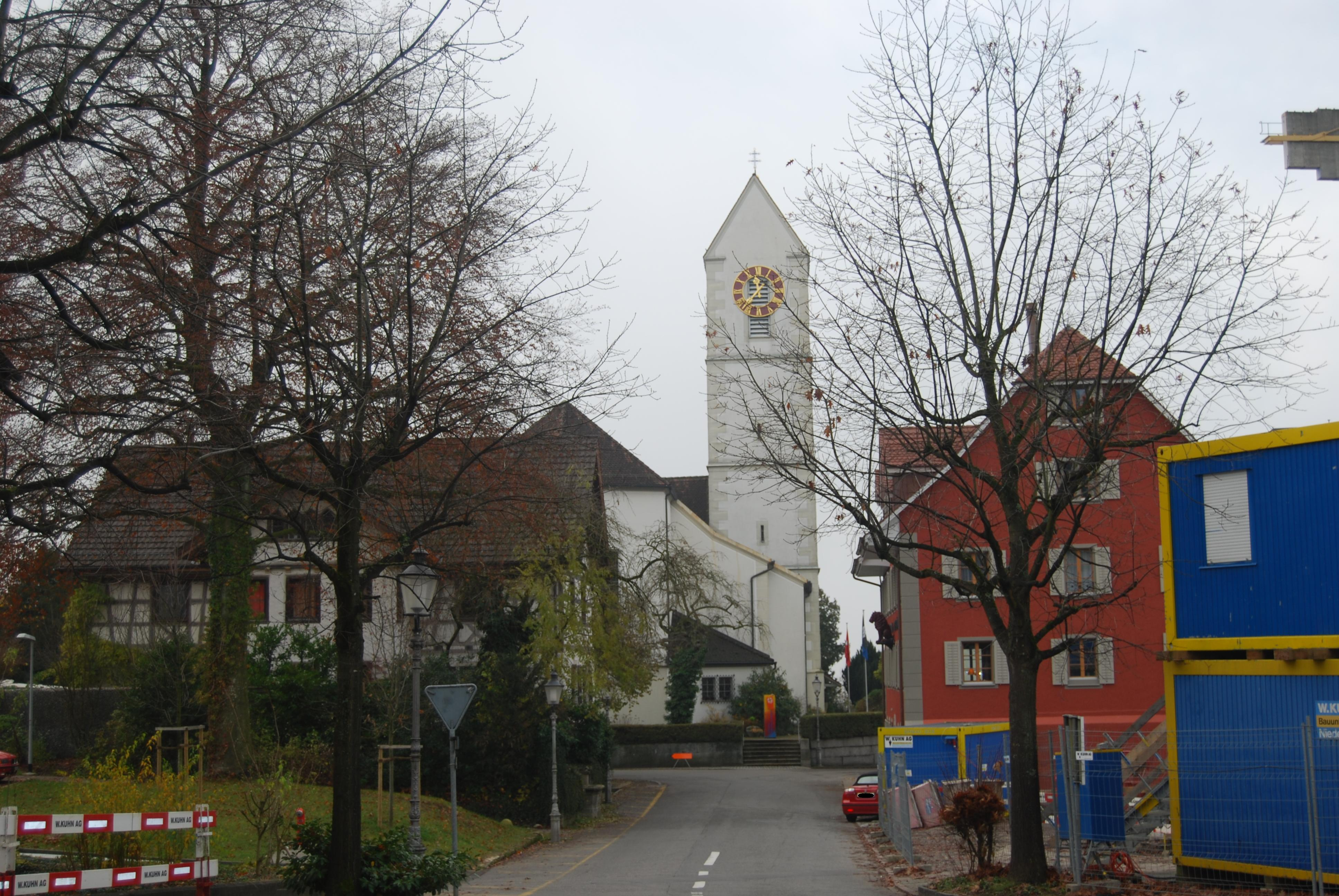

- Flag Coat of arms
- Location of Oberrohrdorf
- Location within Switzerland Location within Canton of Aargau
- Coordinates: 47°25′N 8°19′E
- Country: Switzerland
- Canton: Aargau
- District: Baden

Area
  - Total: 4.30 km^{2} (1.66 sq mi)
- Elevation: 493 m (1,617 ft)
- Highest elevation (Heitersberg): 702 m (2,303 ft)

Population (December 2020)
  - Total: 4,037
  - Density: 939/km^{2} (2,430/sq mi)
- Time zone: UTC+01:00 (CET)
  - Summer (DST): UTC+02:00 (CEST)
- Postal code: 5452
- SFOS number: 4037
- ISO 3166 code: CH-AG
- Surrounded by: Fislisbach, Killwangen, Neuenhof, Niederrohrdorf, Remetschwil, Spreitenbach
- Website: oberrohrdorf.ch

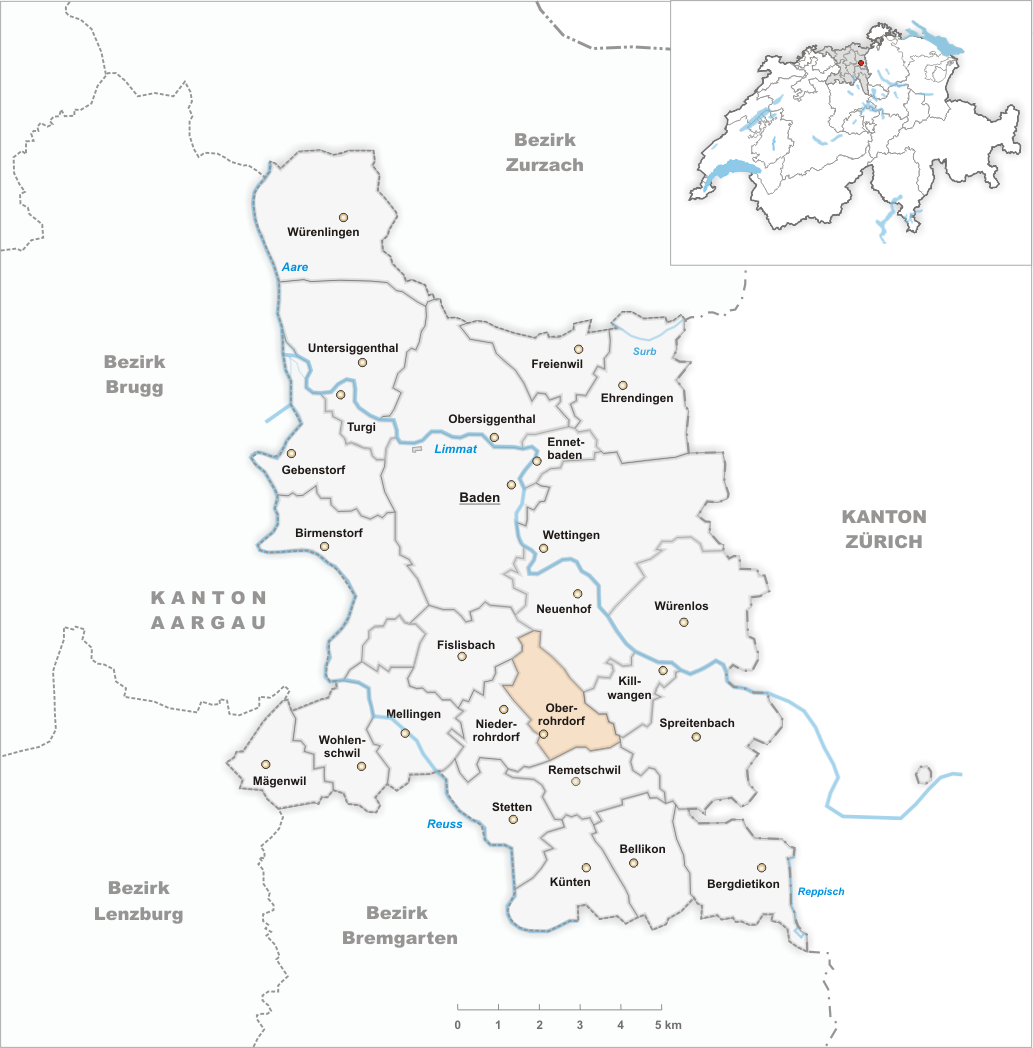
Oberrohrdorf

Oberrohrdorf is a municipality in the district of Baden in the canton of Aargau in Switzerland.

== History ==
Aerial view (1957)

Oberrohrdorf is first mentioned in 1179 as Rordorf. Around 1303-08 it was mentioned as ze Oberen-Rordorf. The hamlet of Staretschwil was first mentioned in 1124 as Starchoswilare. In 1854 the municipality of Rohrdorf split into Niederrohrdorf, Oberrohrdorf and Remetschwil.

== Geography ==
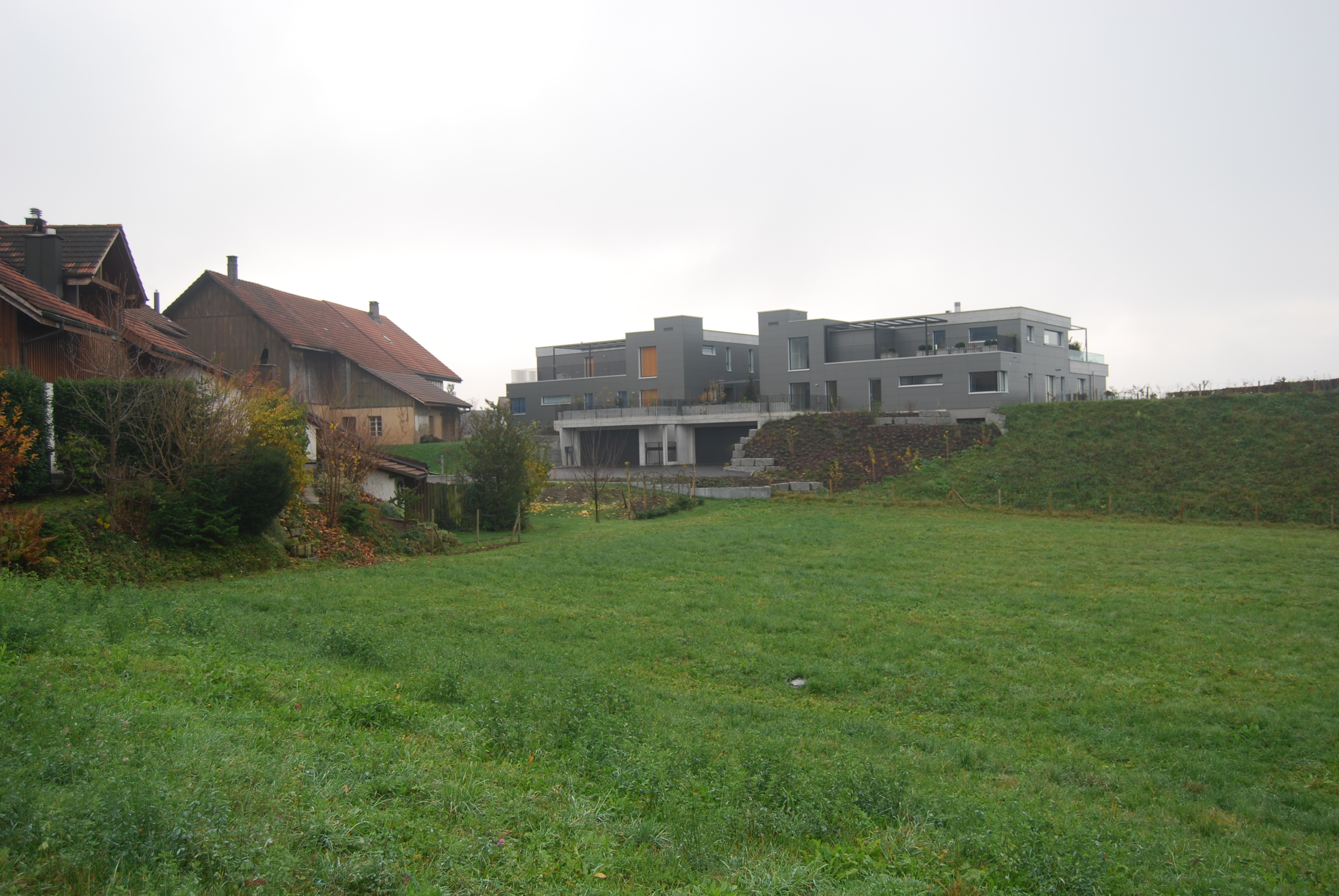
Oberrohrdorf

Oberrohrdorf has an area, as of 2006, of 4.3 km^{2} (1.7 sq mi). Of this area, 39.8% is used for agricultural purposes, while 39.5% is forested. The rest of the land, (20.7%) is settled.

The municipality is located in the Baden district on western flank of the Heitersberg. It consists of the village of Oberrohrdorf and the hamlet of Staretschwil.

== Coat of arms ==
The blazon of the municipal coat of arms is Gules a Royal Orb Or crossed with Cross Patriarchal of the same topped and in chief a Mullet Argent all between two Bulrushes proper issuant from Coupeaux Vert.

== Demographics ==
Oberrohrdorf has a population (as of 31 December 2020) of 4,037. As of 2008, 15.2% of the population was made up of foreign nationals. Over the last 10 years the population has grown at a rate of 10.7%. Most of the population (as of 2000) speaks German (91.0%), with Italian being second most common ( 1.2%) and Albanian being third ( 1.1%).

The age distribution, as of 2008, in Oberrohrdorf is; 292 children or 7.9% of the population are between 0 and 9 years old and 411 teenagers or 11.1% are between 10 and 19. Of the adult population, 451 people or 12.2% of the population are between 20 and 29 years old. 426 people or 11.5% are between 30 and 39, 604 people or 16.3% are between 40 and 49, and 540 people or 14.6% are between 50 and 59. The senior population distribution is 512 people or 13.8% of the population are between 60 and 69 years old, 349 people or 9.4% are between 70 and 79, there are 112 people or 3.0% who are between 80 and 89, and there are 7 people or 0.2% who are 90 and older.

As of 2000, there were 96 homes with 1 or 2 persons in the household, 605 homes with 3 or 4 persons in the household, and 645 homes with 5 or more persons in the household. The average number of people per household was 2.47 individuals. In 2008 there were 706 single family homes (or 42.4% of the total) out of a total of 1,664 homes and apartments.

In the 2007 federal election the most popular party was the SVP which received 30.7% of the vote. The next three most popular parties were the FDP (20.5%), the CVP (18.8%) and the SP (14.2%).

In Oberrohrdorf about 82.3% of the population (between age 25–64) have completed either non-mandatory upper secondary education or additional higher education (either university or a Fachhochschule). Of the school age population (in the 2008/2009 school year), there are 214 students attending primary school, there are 103 students attending secondary school in the municipality.

The historical population is given in the following table:

Historical population
Year	Pop.	±%
1780	267	—
1803	185	−30.7%
1860	594	+221.1%
1900	625	+5.2%
1950	815	+30.4%
1975	2,663	+226.7%
1980	2,888	+8.4%
1990	3,345	+15.8%
2000	3,364	+0.6%

== Economy ==
As of 2007, Oberrohrdorf had an unemployment rate of 2.14%. As of 2005, there were 39 people employed in the primary economic sector and about 13 businesses involved in this sector. 118 people are employed in the secondary sector and there are 21 businesses in this sector. 339 people are employed in the tertiary sector, with 86 businesses in this sector.

As of 2000 there were 1,725 total workers who lived in the municipality. Of these, 1,485 or about 86.1% of the residents worked outside Oberrohrdorf while 199 people commuted into the municipality for work. There were a total of 439 jobs (of at least 6 hours per week) in the municipality.

== Religion ==
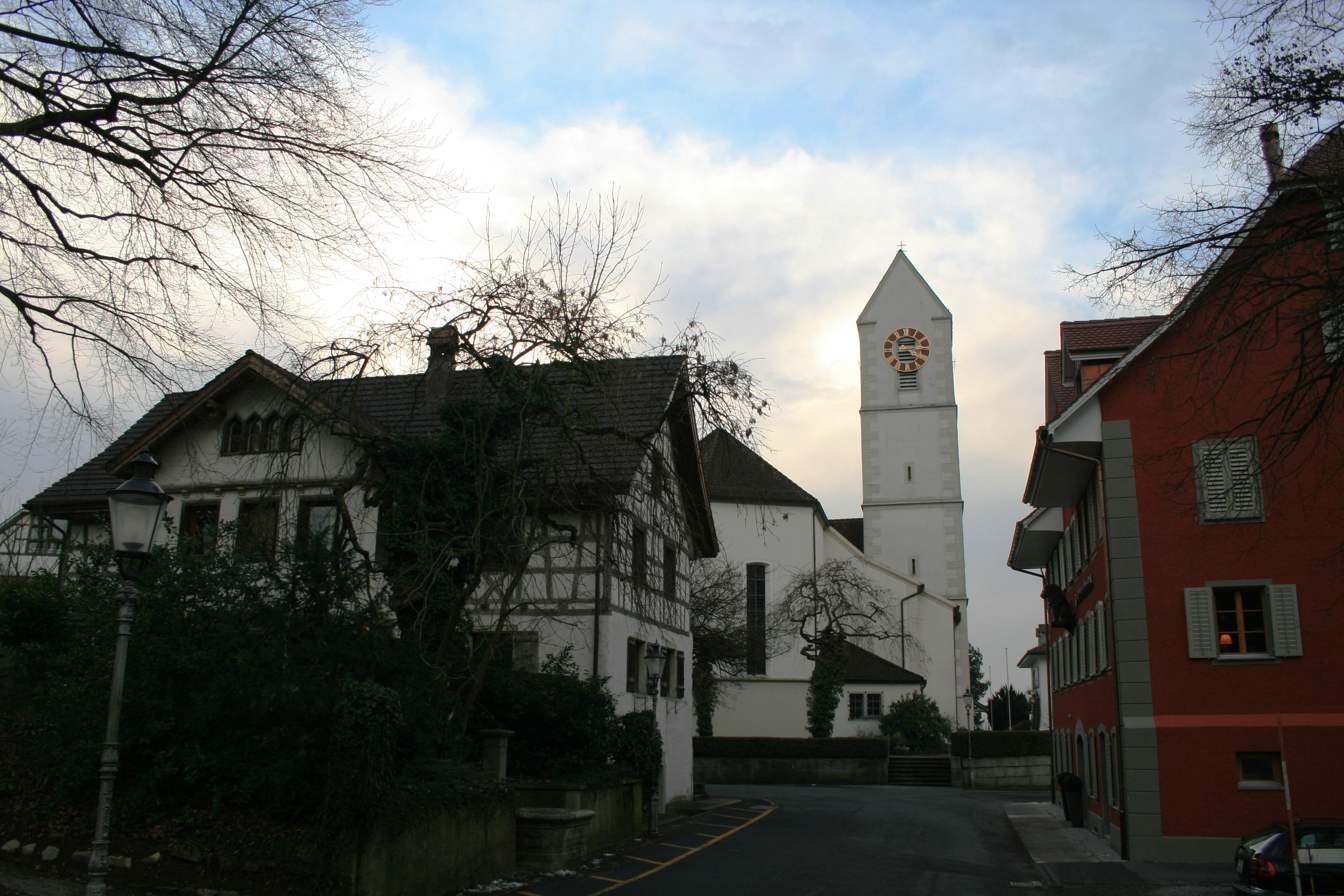
Roman Catholic Church of Oberrohrdorf

From the 2000 census, 1,566 or 46.6% are Roman Catholic, while 1,111 or 33.0% belonged to the Swiss Reformed Church. Of the rest of the population, there are 8 individuals (or about 0.24% of the population) who belong to the Christian Catholic faith.
