= Stetten, Aargau =

Stetten
- Municipality
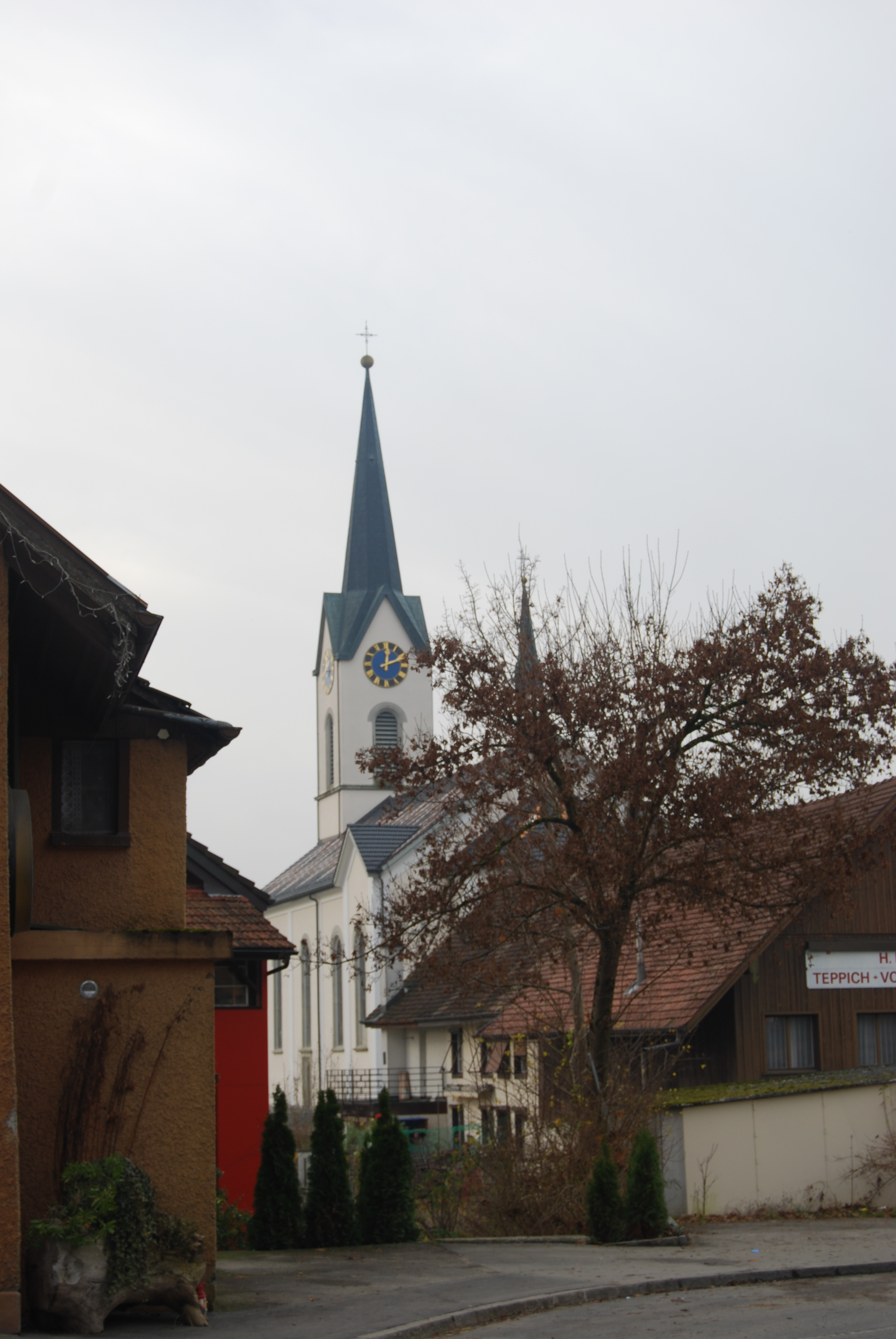

- Flag Coat of arms
- Location of Stetten
- Location within Switzerland Location within Canton of Aargau
- Coordinates: 47°24′N 8°18′E
- Country: Switzerland
- Canton: Aargau
- District: Baden

Area
  - Total: 4.41 km^{2} (1.70 sq mi)
- Elevation: 383 m (1,257 ft)

Population (December 2020)
  - Total: 2,224
  - Density: 504/km^{2} (1,310/sq mi)
- Time zone: UTC+01:00 (CET)
  - Summer (DST): UTC+02:00 (CEST)
- Postal code: 5608
- SFOS number: 4041
- ISO 3166 code: CH-AG
- Surrounded by: Künten, Mellingen, Niederrohrdorf, Niederwil, Remetschwil, Tägerig
- Website: www.stetten-ag.ch

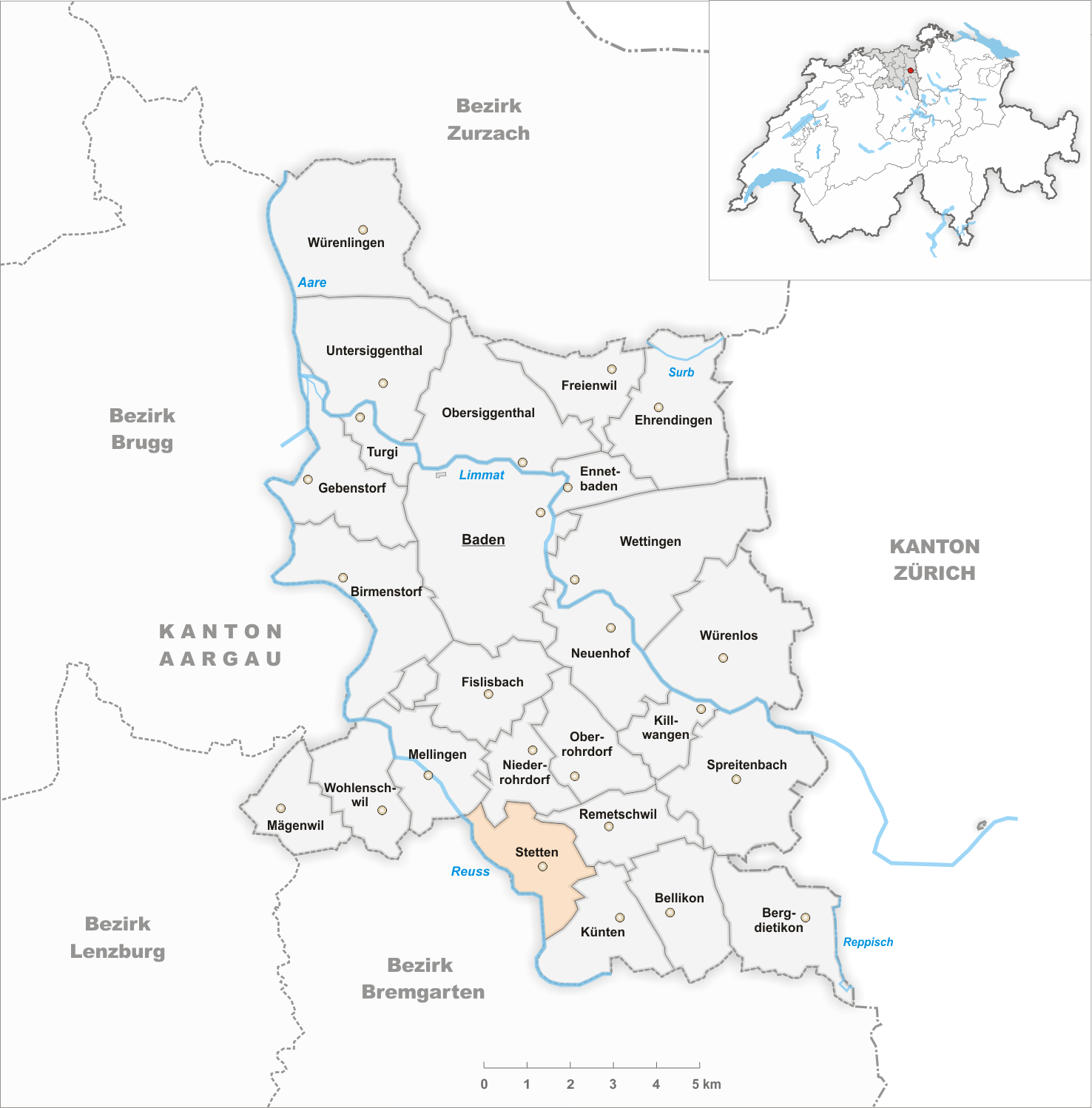
Stetten

Stetten is a municipality in the district of Baden in the canton of Aargau in Switzerland.

== Geography ==
Aerial view (1946)

Stetten has an area, as of 2006, of 4.4 square kilometers (1.7 sq mi). Of this area, 50.2% is used for agricultural purposes, while 27.7% is forested. Of the rest of the land, 16.7% is settled (buildings or roads) and the remainder (5.4%) is non-productive (rivers or lakes).

== Coat of arms ==
The blazon of the municipal coat of arms is Gules a Cross Lorraine pattee fitchy patonce Argent and in chief two Mullets of Five of the same.

== Demographics ==
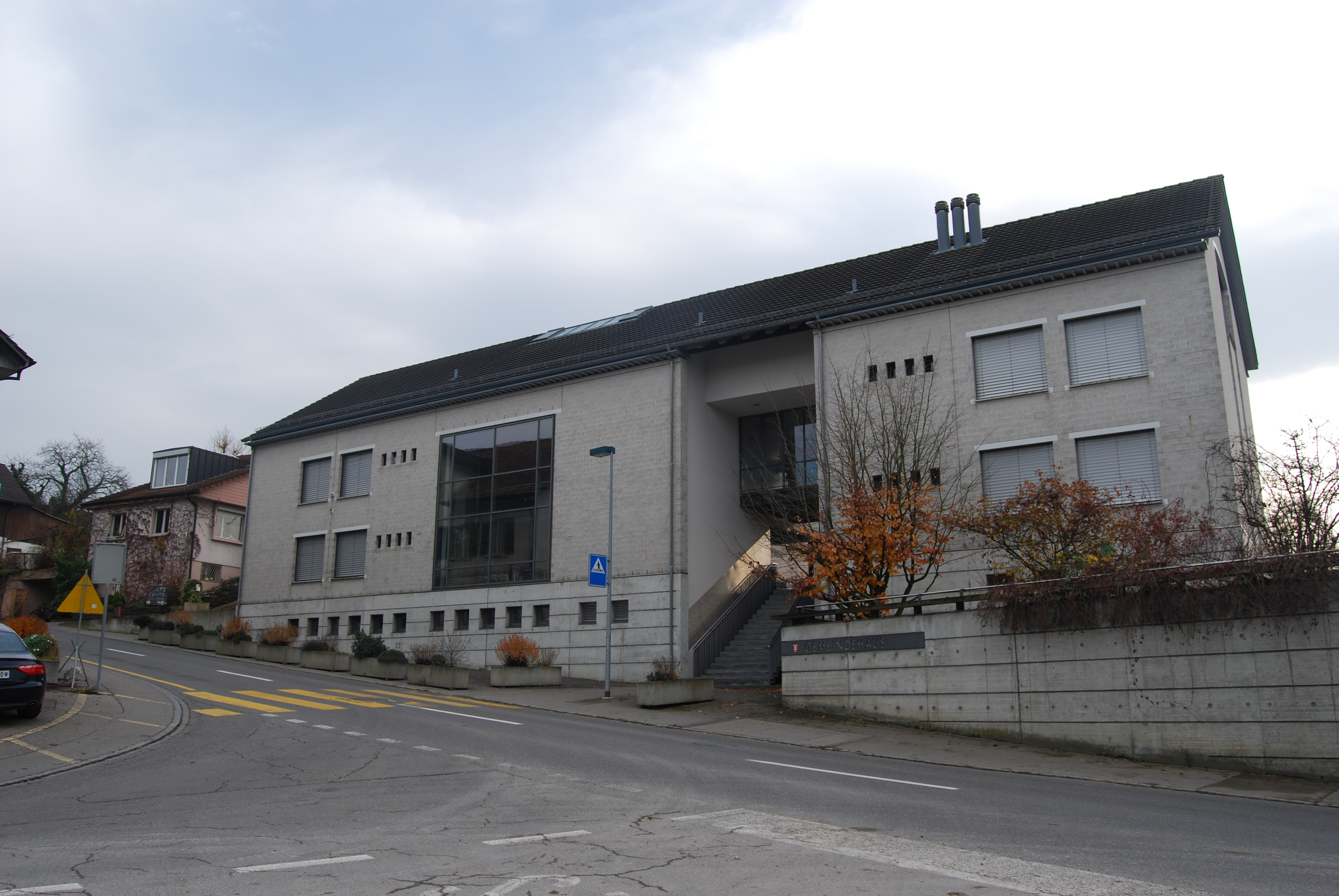
Municipal administration

Stetten has a population (as of 31 December 2020) of 2,224. As of 2008, 18.8% of the population was made up of foreign nationals. Over the last 10 years the population has decreased at a rate of -0.6%. Most of the population (as of 2000) speaks German (90.1%), with Albanian being second most common ( 2.5%) and Italian being third ( 1.9%).

The age distribution, as of 2008, in Stetten is; 164 children or 10.6% of the population are between 0 and 9 years old and 221 teenagers or 14.3% are between 10 and 19. Of the adult population, 208 people or 13.4% of the population are between 20 and 29 years old. 194 people or 12.5% are between 30 and 39, 271 people or 17.5% are between 40 and 49, and 240 people or 15.5% are between 50 and 59. The senior population distribution is 138 people or 8.9% of the population are between 60 and 69 years old, 81 people or 5.2% are between 70 and 79, there are 26 people or 1.7% who are between 80 and 89, and there are 4 people or 0.3% who are 90 and older.

As of 2000, there were 24 homes with 1 or 2 persons in the household, 244 homes with 3 or 4 persons in the household, and 286 homes with 5 or more persons in the household. The average number of people per household was 2.70 individuals. In 2008 there were 338 single family homes (or 50.1% of the total) out of a total of 675 homes and apartments. There were a total of 2 empty apartments for a 0.3% vacancy rate. As of 2007, the construction rate of new housing units was 4.6 new units per 1000 residents.

In the 2007 federal election the most popular party was the SVP which received 36.2% of the vote. The next three most popular parties were the CVP (16.5%), the FDP (15.9%) and the SP (14%).

In Stetten about 78.2% of the population (between age 25-64) have completed either non-mandatory upper secondary education or additional higher education (either university or a Fachhochschule). Of the school age population (in the 2008/2009 school year), there are 137 students attending primary school, there are 51 students attending secondary school in the municipality.

The historical population is given in the following table:

Historical population
Year	Pop.	±%
1975	960	—
1980	972	+1.2%
1990	1,407	+44.8%
2000	1,587	+12.8%

== Economy ==
As of 2007, Stetten had an unemployment rate of 1.64%. As of 2005, there were 69 people employed in the primary economic sector and about 19 businesses involved in this sector. 458 people are employed in the secondary sector and there are 31 businesses in this sector. 215 people are employed in the tertiary sector, with 51 businesses in this sector.

As of 2000 there were 839 total workers who lived in the municipality. Of these, 636 or about 75.8% of the residents worked outside Stetten while 442 people commuted into the municipality for work. There were a total of 645 jobs (of at least 6 hours per week) in the municipality. Of the working population, 11.8% used public transportation to get to work, and 55.2% used a private car.

== Religion ==
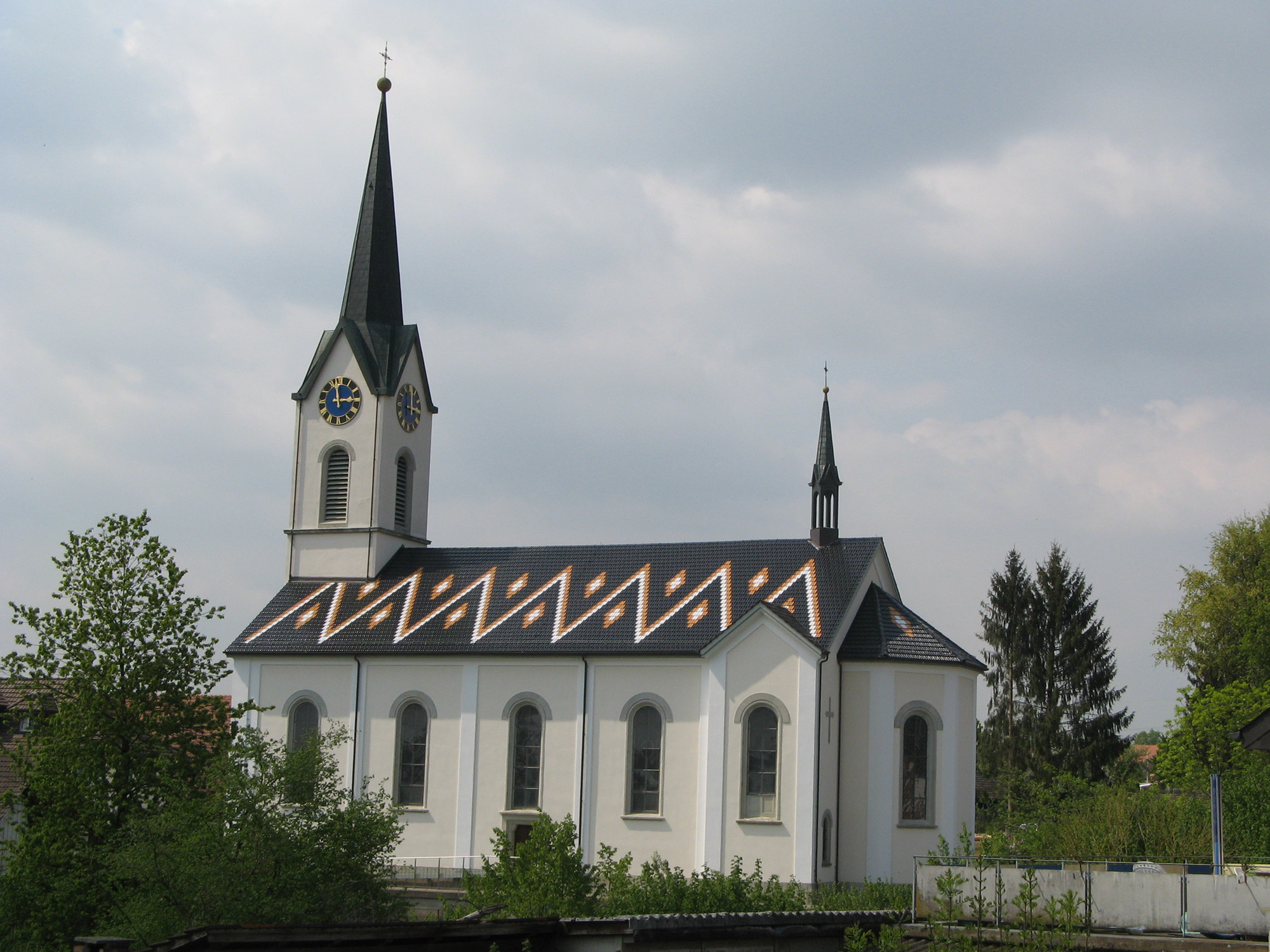
Roman Catholic Church in Stetten

From the 2000 census, 831 or 53.7% are Roman Catholic, while 395 or 25.5% belonged to the Swiss Reformed Church. Of the rest of the population, there is 1 individual who belongs to the Christian Catholic faith.
