= Remetschwil =

- Municipality
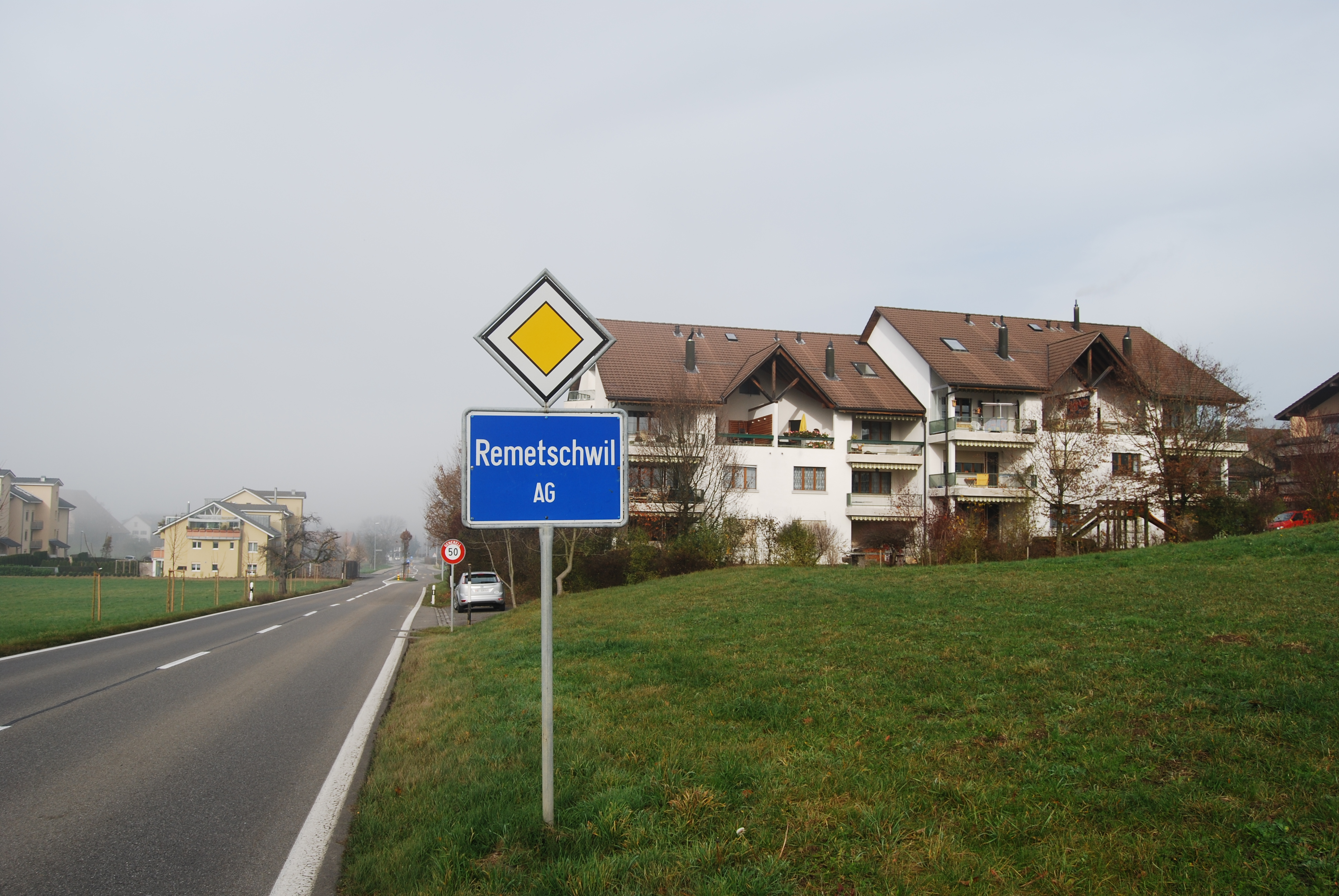

- Flag Coat of arms
- Location of Remetschwil
- Location within Switzerland Location within Canton of Aargau
- Coordinates: 47°25′N 8°20′E
- Country: Switzerland
- Canton: Aargau
- District: Baden

Area
  - Total: 3.88 km^{2} (1.50 sq mi)
- Elevation: 524 m (1,719 ft)

Population (December 2020)
  - Total: 2,023
  - Density: 521/km^{2} (1,350/sq mi)
- Time zone: UTC+01:00 (CET)
  - Summer (DST): UTC+02:00 (CEST)
- Postal code: 5453
- SFOS number: 4039
- ISO 3166 code: CH-AG
- Surrounded by: Bellikon, Künten, Niederrohrdorf, Oberrohrdorf, Spreitenbach, Stetten
- Website: www.remetschwil.ch

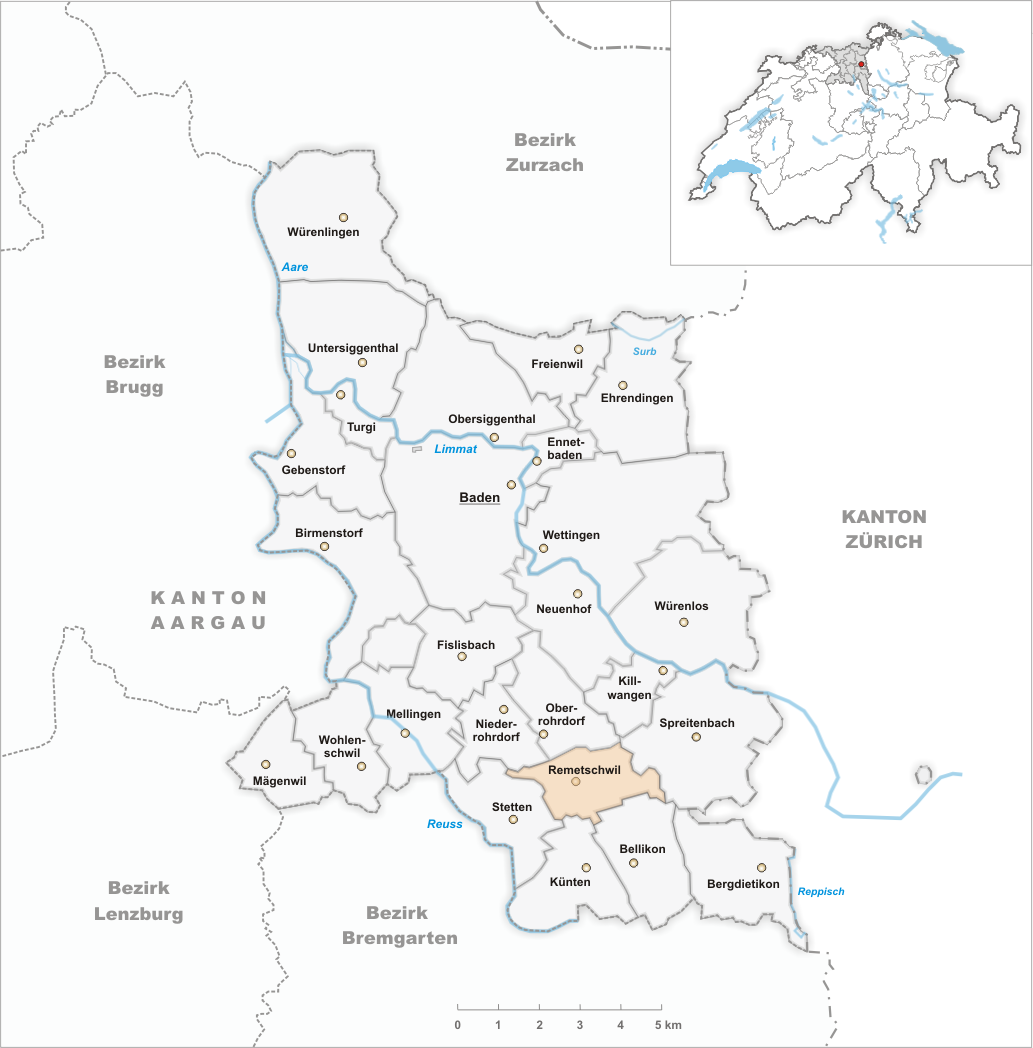
Remetschwil

Remetschwil is a municipality in the district of Baden in the canton of Aargau in Switzerland.

== History ==
Remetschwil is first mentioned in 1184 as Reimiswilare. In 1854 the independent municipality was created when Rohrdorf split into Niederrohrdorf, Oberrohrdorf and Remetschwil.

== Geography ==
Aerial view (1952)

Remetschwil has an area, as of 2006, of 3.9 km^{2} (1.5 sq mi). Of this area, 59.2% is used for agricultural purposes, while 24.2% is forested. Of the rest of the land, 16.4% is settled (buildings or roads) and the remainder (0.3%) is non-productive (rivers or lakes).

The municipality is located in the Baden district, on the south-west flank of the Heitersberg. It consists of the village of Remetschwil and the hamlets of Busslingen in the Reuss valley and Sennhof on the Heitersberg.

== Coat of arms ==
The blazon of the municipal coat of arms is Per fess Or a Buck passant regardant Gules and Gules a Royal Orb Or.

== Demographics ==
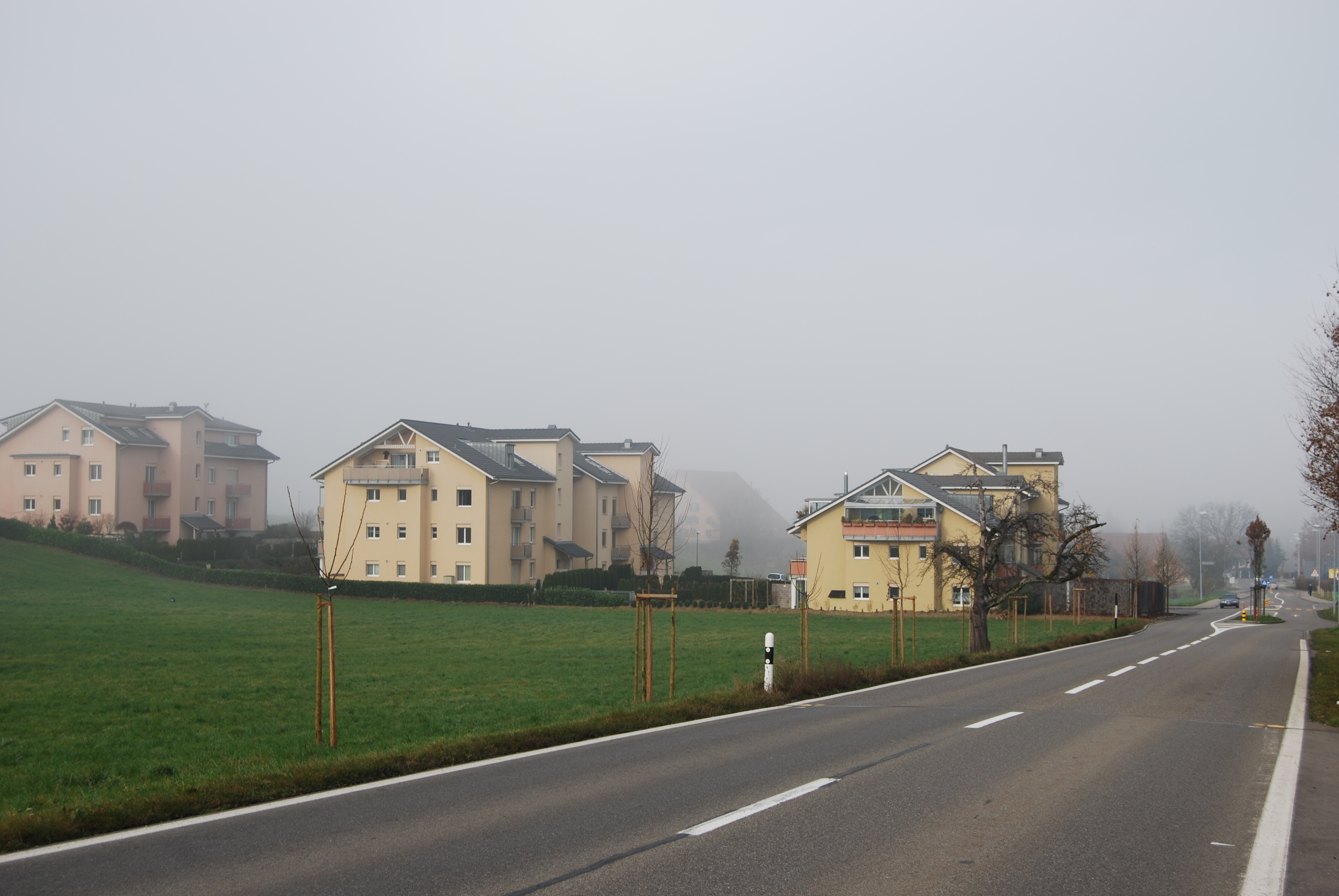
Apartment buildings in Remetschwil

Remetschwil has a population (as of 31 December 2020) of 2,023. As of 2008, 12.3% of the population was made up of foreign nationals. Over the last 10 years the population has grown at a rate of 20.6%. Most of the population (as of 2000) speaks German (93.8%), with Italian being second most common (1.4%) and Albanian being third (0.9%).

The age distribution, as of 2008, in Remetschwil is; 226 children or 11.5% of the population are between 0 and 9 years old and 266 teenagers or 13.6% are between 10 and 19. Of the adult population, 189 people or 9.7% of the population are between 20 and 29 years old. 224 people or 11.4% are between 30 and 39, 423 people or 21.6% are between 40 and 49, and 308 people or 15.7% are between 50 and 59. The senior population distribution is 208 people or 10.6% of the population are between 60 and 69 years old, 78 people or 4.0% are between 70 and 79, there are 28 people or 1.4% who are between 80 and 89, and there are 7 people or 0.4% who are 90 and older.

As of 2000, there were 30 homes with 1 or 2 persons in the household, 206 homes with 3 or 4 persons in the household, and 390 homes with 5 or more persons in the household. The average number of people per household was 2.72 individuals. In 2008 there were 449 single family homes (or 58.5% of the total) out of a total of 768 homes and apartments.

In the 2007 federal election the most popular party was the SVP which received 34.4% of the vote. The next three most popular parties were the CVP (18.2%), the FDP (16.3%) and the SP (14.4%).

In Remetschwil about 85.9% of the population (between age 25-64) have completed either non-mandatory upper secondary education or additional higher education (either university or a Fachhochschule). Of the school age population (in the 2008/2009 school year), there are 164 students attending primary school in the municipality.

The historical population is given in the following table:

Historical population
| Year | Pop. | ±% |
|---|---|---|
| 1780 | 221 | — |
| 1803 | 290 | +31.2% |
| 1860 | 575 | +98.3% |
| 1900 | 482 | −16.2% |
| 1950 | 490 | +1.7% |
| 2000 | 1,759 | +259.0% |

== Economy ==
As of 2007, Remetschwil had an unemployment rate of 2%. As of 2005, there were 43 people employed in the primary economic sector and about 15 businesses involved in this sector. 173 people are employed in the secondary sector and there are 24 businesses in this sector. 183 people are employed in the tertiary sector, with 54 businesses in this sector.

As of 2000 there were 959 total workers who lived in the municipality. Of these, 800 or about 83.4% of the residents worked outside Remetschwil while 232 people commuted into the municipality for work. There were a total of 391 jobs (of at least 6 hours per week) in the municipality.

== Religion ==
From the 2000 census, 830 or 47.2% are Roman Catholic, while 568 or 32.3% belonged to the Swiss Reformed Church. Of the rest of the population, there are 6 individuals (or about 0.34% of the population) who belong to the Christian Catholic faith.
