= Fislisbach =

- Municipality
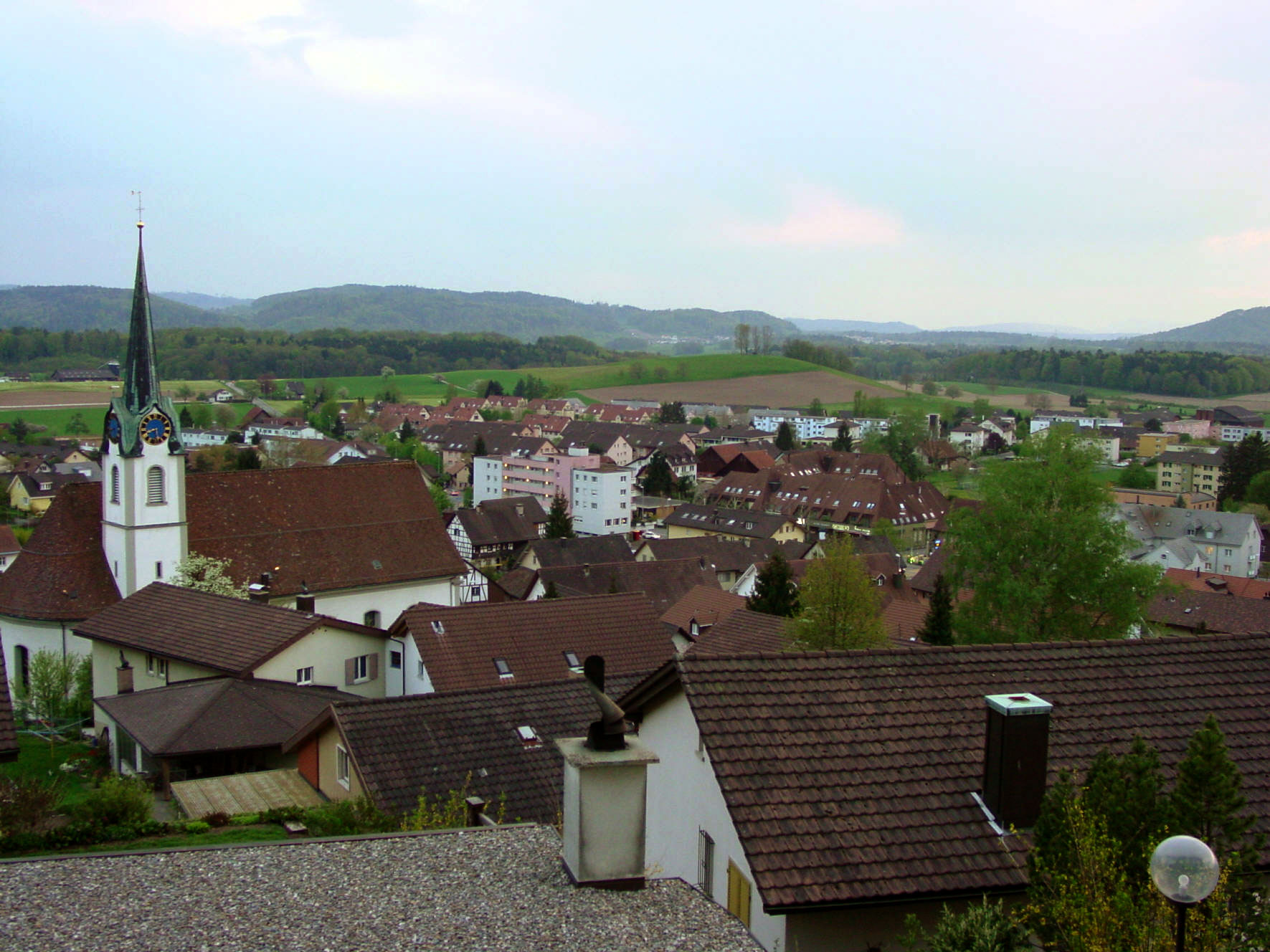
- Fislisbach village from Buech hill

- Flag Coat of arms
- Location of Fislisbach
- Location within Switzerland Location within Canton of Aargau
- Coordinates: 47°26′N 8°18′E
- Country: Switzerland
- Canton: Aargau
- District: Baden

Area
  - Total: 5.05 km^{2} (1.95 sq mi)
- Elevation: 426 m (1,398 ft)

Population (December 2020)
  - Total: 5,578
  - Density: 1,100/km^{2} (2,860/sq mi)
- Time zone: UTC+01:00 (CET)
  - Summer (DST): UTC+02:00 (CEST)
- Postal code: 5442
- SFOS number: 4027
- ISO 3166 code: CH-AG
- Surrounded by: Baden, Birmenstorf, Mellingen, Neuenhof, Niederrohrdorf, Oberrohrdorf
- Twin towns: Le Chambon-sur-Lignon (France)
- Website: fislisbach.ch

Fislisbach is a municipality in the district of Baden in the canton of Aargau in Switzerland.

== History ==
Fislisbach is first mentioned in 1184 as Vicelisbach.

== Geography ==
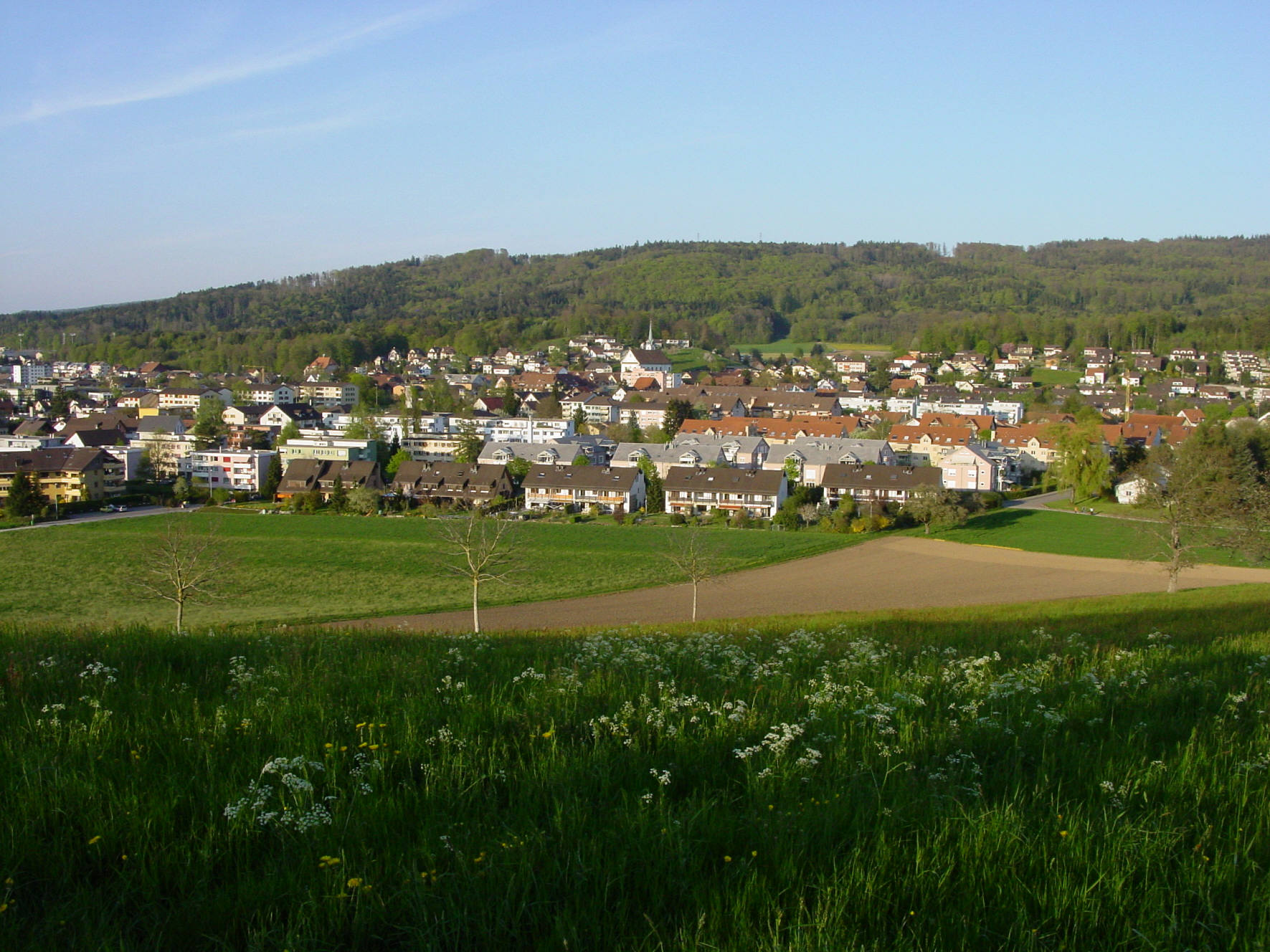
Fislisbach from Boll hill

Aerial view from 300 m by Walter Mittelholzer (1920)

As of 2006, Fislisbach has an area of 5.1 km^{2} (2.0 sq mi). Of this area, 47.5% is used for agricultural purposes, while 30.6% is forested. The rest of the land, (22%) is settled.

The municipality is located in the Baden district beneath the Heitersberg. It consists of the linear village of Fislisbach and scattered single and multifamily housing developments.

== Coat of arms ==
The blazon of the municipal coat of arms is Azure a Cross Lorraine pattee fitchy patonce Argent

== Demographics ==
Fislisbach has a population (as of 31 December 2020) of 5,578. As of 2008, 22.5% of the population was made up of foreign nationals. Over the last 10 years, the population has grown at a rate of 6%. Most of the population (as of 2000) speaks German (87.0%), with Italian being second most common (2.8%) and Serbo-Croatian being third (1.6%).

The age distribution, as of 2008, in Fislisbach is; 507 children or 10.0% of the population are between 0 and 9 years old and 544 teenagers or 10.7% are between 10 and 19. Of the adult population, 654 people or 12.9% of the population are between 20 and 29 years old. 736 people or 14.5% are between 30 and 39, 853 people or 16.9% are between 40 and 49, and 664 people or 13.1% are between 50 and 59. The senior population distribution is 593 people or 11.7% of the population are between 60 and 69 years old, 351 people or 6.9% are between 70 and 79, there are 140 people or 2.8% who are between 80 and 89, and there are 19 people or 0.4% who are 90 and older.

As of 2000, there were 163 homes with 1 or 2 persons in the household, 1,231 homes with 3 or 4 persons in the household, and 646 homes with 5 or more persons in the household. The average number of people per household was 2.32 individuals. In 2008, there were 642 single family homes (or 26.8% of the total) out of a total of 2,396 homes and apartments.

In the 2007, federal election the most popular party was the SVP which received 33.6% of the vote. The next three most popular parties were the SP (18.4%), the CVP (17.5%), and the FDP (14.5%).

The entire Swiss population is generally well-educated. In Fislisbach, about 77% of the population (between age 25-64) have completed either non-mandatory upper secondary education or additional higher education (either university or a Fachhochschule). Of the school age population (in the 2008/2009 school year), there are 382 students attending primary school, there are 130 students attending secondary school in the municipality.

The historical population is given in the following table:

Historical population
Year	Pop.	±%
1799	342	—
1850	685	+100.3%
1900	676	−1.3%
1950	1,334	+97.3%
1970	3,370	+152.6%
1975	3,733	+10.8%
1980	3,882	+4.0%
1990	4,438	+14.3%
2000	4,974	+12.1%

== Sport ==
Local football team FC Baden play at the Esp Stadium in the village.

== Economy ==
As of 2007, Fislisbach had an unemployment rate of 2.48%. As of 2005, there were 102 people employed in the primary economic sector and about 15 businesses involved in this sector. 229 people are employed in the secondary sector and there are 30 businesses in this sector. 788 people are employed in the tertiary sector, with 129 businesses in this sector.

As of 2000 there were 2,751 total workers who lived in the municipality. Of these, 2,321 or about 84.4% of the residents worked outside Fislisbach while 582 people commuted into the municipality for work. There were a total of 1,012 jobs (of at least 6 hours per week) in the municipality.

== Transportation ==
It can be accessed by the nearby A1 motorway. The Mellingen Heitersberg railway station is 1.5 km from the village.

== Religion ==
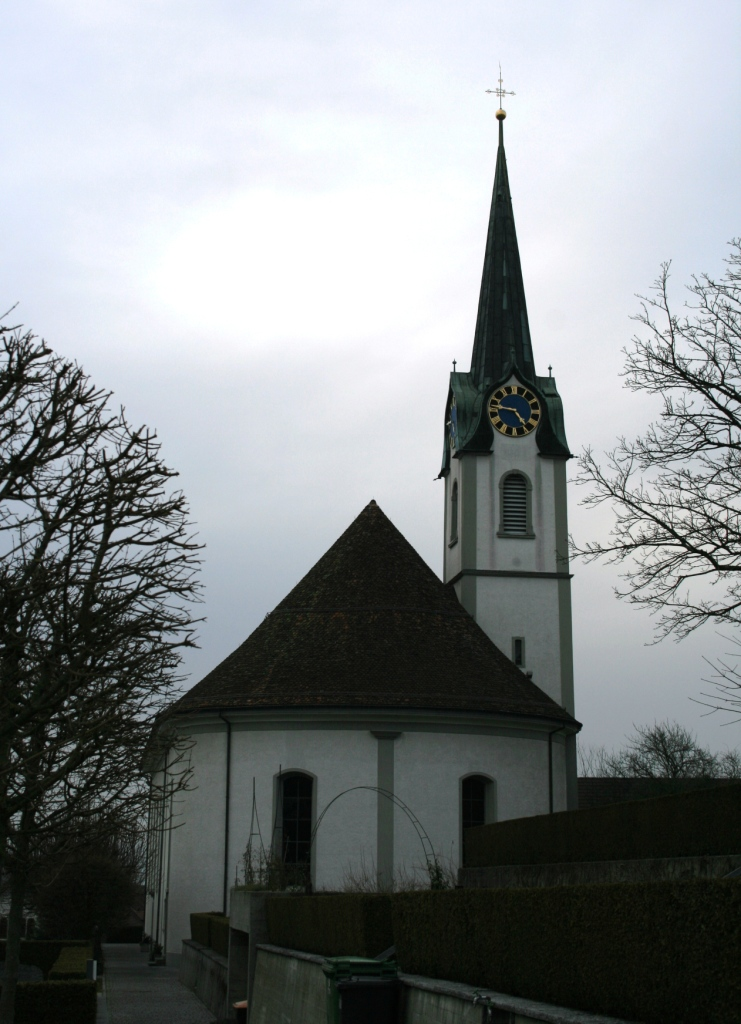
Fislisbach Roman Catholic Church

From the 2000 census, 2,672 or 53.7% are Roman Catholic, while 1,298 or 26.1% belonged to the Swiss Reformed Church. Of the rest of the population, there are 13 individuals (or about 0.26% of the population) who belong to the Christian Catholic faith.
