= Killwangen-Spreitenbach railway station =

Railway station in Killwangen, Switzerland

Killwangen-Spreitenbach
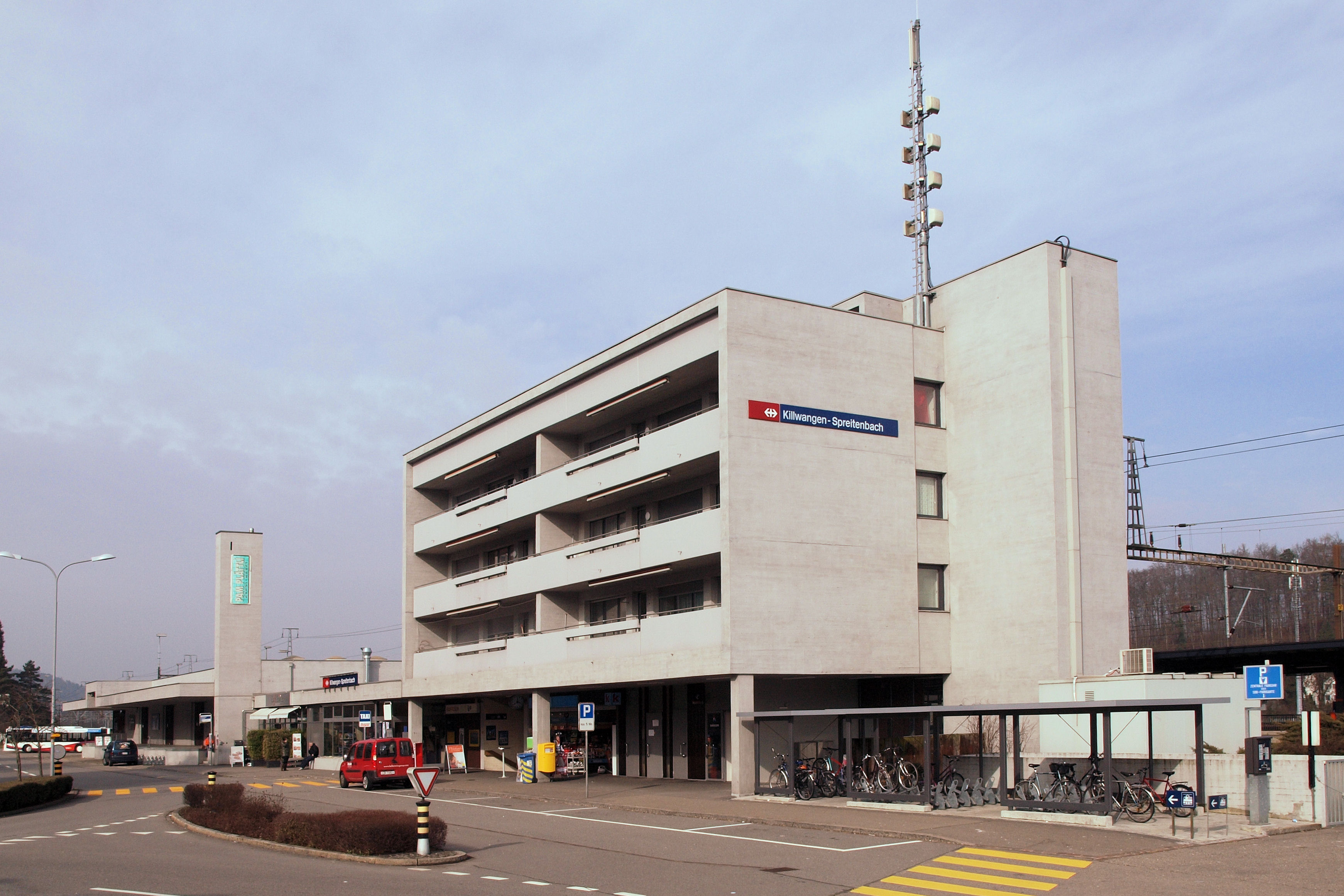
- The station building in 2010

General information
- Location: Bahnhofstrasse; Killwangen, Aargau; Switzerland
- Coordinates: 47°26′00″N 8°21′15″E
- Elevation: 393 m (1,289 ft)
- Owner: Swiss Federal Railways (since 1902); Schweizerische Nordostbahn (1853-1902); Schweizerische Nordbahn (1848-1853)
- Lines: Heitersberg railway line; Wettingen–Effretikon railway line; Zürich–Baden railway line
- Distance: 16.1 km (10.0 mi) from Zürich HB
- Train operators: Swiss Federal Railways
- Connections: Trams in Zürich: 20; Regionale Verkehrsbetriebe Baden-Wettingen

Other information
- Fare zone: 572 (Tarifverbund A-Welle)

History
- Opened: 1848
- Former names: Killwangen (until 1912)

Services
Preceding station	Zurich S-Bahn	Following station
Mellingen Heitersberg towards Aarau	S11	Dietikon towards Seuzach or Wila
Neuenhof towards Brugg AG	S12	Dietikon towards Schaffhausen or Wil
Neuenhof towards Aarau	SN1 Limited service	Dietikon towards Winterthur
Mellingen Heitersberg towards Olten	SN11 Limited service	Dietikon towards Winterthur
Location
- Location within Switzerland Location within Canton of Aargau

Killwangen-Spreitenbach railway station (German: Bahnhof Killwangen-Spreitenbach) is a railway station in the municipality of Killwangen in the Swiss canton of Aargau. As the name suggests, the station also serves the adjacent municipality of Spreitenbach.

The station is located on the Zürich–Baden railway line, just east of the point where the newer route via the Heitersberg Tunnel diverges from the original line via Baden. There is also a freight-only connection to the Wettingen–Effretikon railway line. The station is served by services S11 and S12 of the Zurich S-Bahn.

The station is the western terminus of the Limmattal light rail line (line 20) from Zürich Altstetten station, providing local service along the Limmat Valley. The line opened in December 2022.

== Services ==
As of the December 2023 timetable change, the following services stop at Killwangen-Spreitenbach, including two nighttime services (SN1, SN11):

- Zurich S-Bahn:
  - S11: half-hourly service between Aarau and Winterthur; hourly service to Seuzach or Sennhof-Kyburg; rush-hour service to Wila.
  - S12: half-hourly service between Brugg AG and Winterthur; hourly service to Schaffhausen or Wil.
  - SN1: on Friday and Saturday night, hourly service between Aarau and Winterthur via Zürich Stadelhofen.
  - SN11: on Friday and Saturday night, hourly service between Winterthur and Olten.

The S11 and S12 combine for service every fifteen minutes between Killwangen-Spreitenbach and Winterthur.

== See also ==
- Rail transport in Switzerland
