= Wettingen railway station =

Railway station in Switzerland

Wettingen
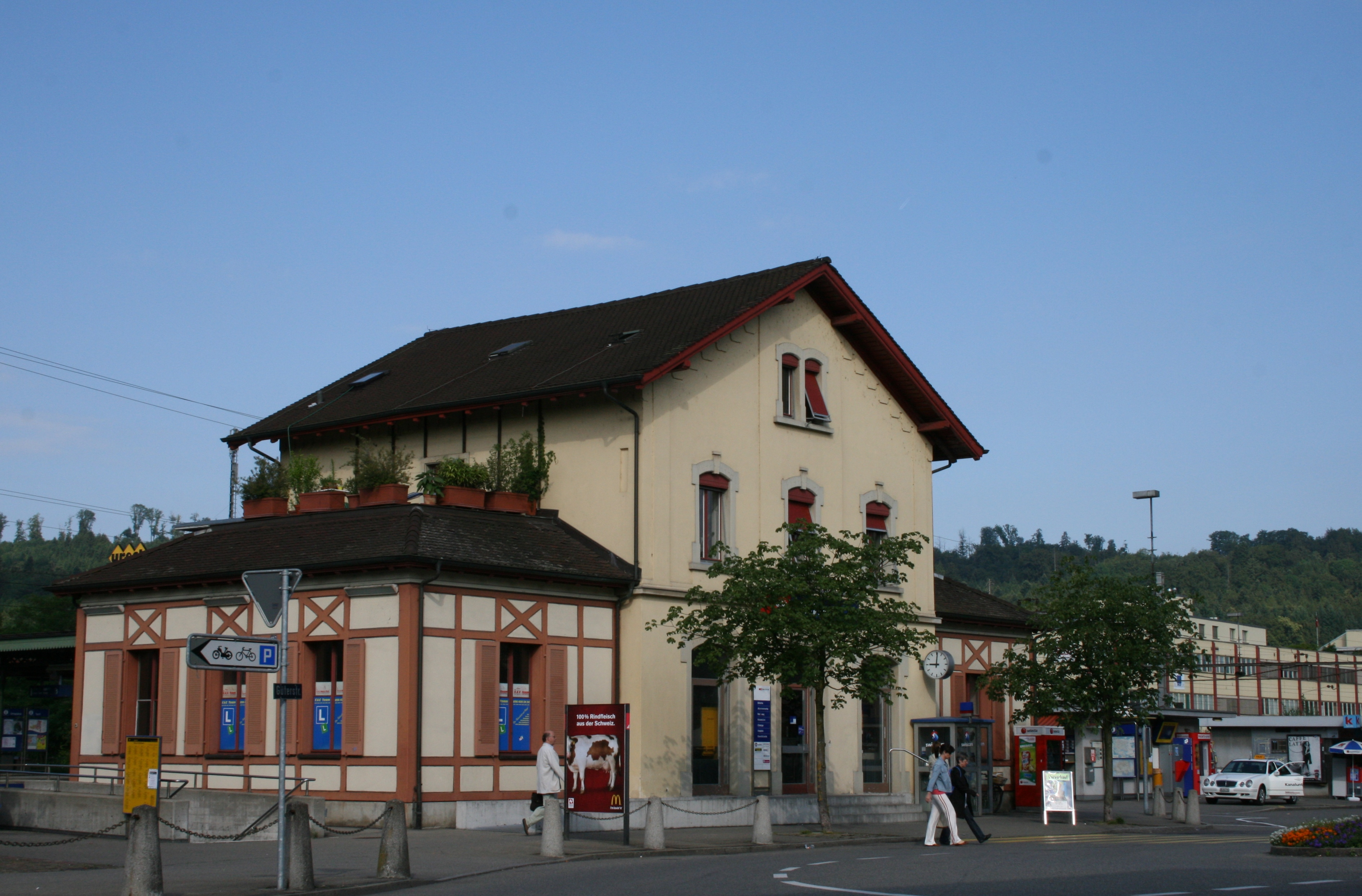
- The station building in 2009

General information
- Location: Bahnhofstrasse; Wettingen, Aargau; Switzerland
- Coordinates: 47°27′35″N 8°18′58″E
- Owner: Swiss Federal Railways (since 1902); Schweizerische Nordostbahn (1876–1902)
- Lines: Zürich–Baden railway line; Furttal railway line
- Train operators: Swiss Federal Railways
- Connections: Schräglift Webermühle; Regionale Verkehrsbetriebe Baden-Wettingen

Other information
- Fare zone: 570 (Tarifverbund A-Welle)

History
- Opened: 1876

Services
Preceding station	SBB CFF FFS	Following station
Baden towards Olten	RE12	Terminus
Preceding station	Zurich S-Bahn	Following station
Baden Terminus	S6	Würenlos towards Uetikon
Baden towards Brugg AG	S12	Neuenhof towards Schaffhausen or Wil
Baden towards Koblenz	S19 Limited service	Dietikon towards Pfäffikon ZH
Baden towards Aarau	SN1 Limited service	Neuenhof towards Winterthur
Location

Wettingen railway station (German: Bahnhof Wettingen) is a railway station in the municipality of Wettingen in the Swiss canton of Aargau. The station is located on the Zürich to Baden main line, just west of the point where the Furttal line joins the main line.

== Services ==
As of the December 2023 timetable change, the following services stop at Wettingen:

- RegioExpress: hourly service to Olten.
- Zürich S-Bahn:
  - S6: half-hourly service between Baden and Uetikon.
  - S12: half-hourly service between Brugg AG and Winterthur; hourly service to Schaffhausen or Wil.
  - S19: peak-hour service between Koblenz and Pfäffikon ZH.
  - SN1: on Friday and Saturday night, hourly service between Aarau and Winterthur via Zürich Stadelhofen.

Schräglift Webermühle provides access from the nearby Webermühle quarter in neighboring Neuenhof.

== See also ==
- Rail transport in Switzerland
