= Neuenhof railway station =

Railway station in Neuenhof, Switzerland

Neuenhof
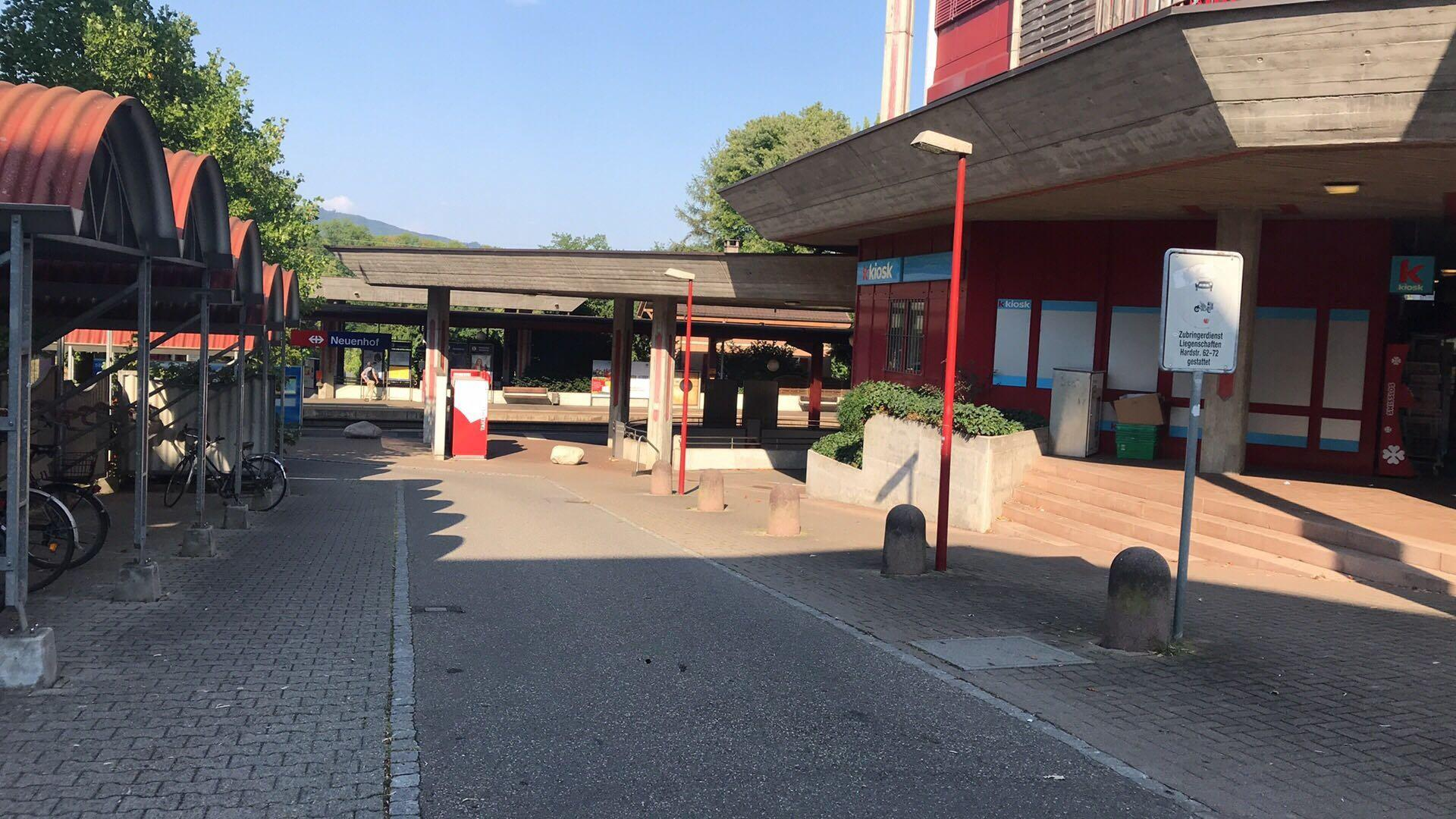
- The station in 2018

General information
- Location: Hardstrasse; Neuenhof, Aargau; Switzerland
- Coordinates: 47°27′01″N 8°19′53″E
- Owner: Swiss Federal Railways
- Line: Zürich–Baden railway line
- Train operators: Swiss Federal Railways

Other information
- Fare zone: 570 (Tarifverbund A-Welle)

History
- Opened: May 1990

Services
Preceding station	Zurich S-Bahn	Following station
Wettingen towards Brugg AG	S12	Killwangen-Spreitenbach towards Schaffhausen or Wil
Wettingen towards Aarau	SN1 Limited service	Killwangen-Spreitenbach towards Winterthur
Location

Neuenhof railway station (German: Bahnhof Neuenhof) is a railway station in the municipality of Neuenhof in the Swiss canton of Aargau. The station is located on the Zürich–Baden railway.

== Services ==
As of the December 2023 timetable change, the following services stop at Neuenhof:

- Zürich S-Bahn:
  - S12: half-hourly service between Brugg AG and Winterthur; hourly service to Schaffhausen or Wil.
  - SN1: on Friday and Saturday night, hourly service between Aarau and Winterthur via Zürich Stadelhofen.

== See also ==
- Rail transport in Switzerland
