= Dietikon railway station =

Railway station in Switzerland

Dietikon
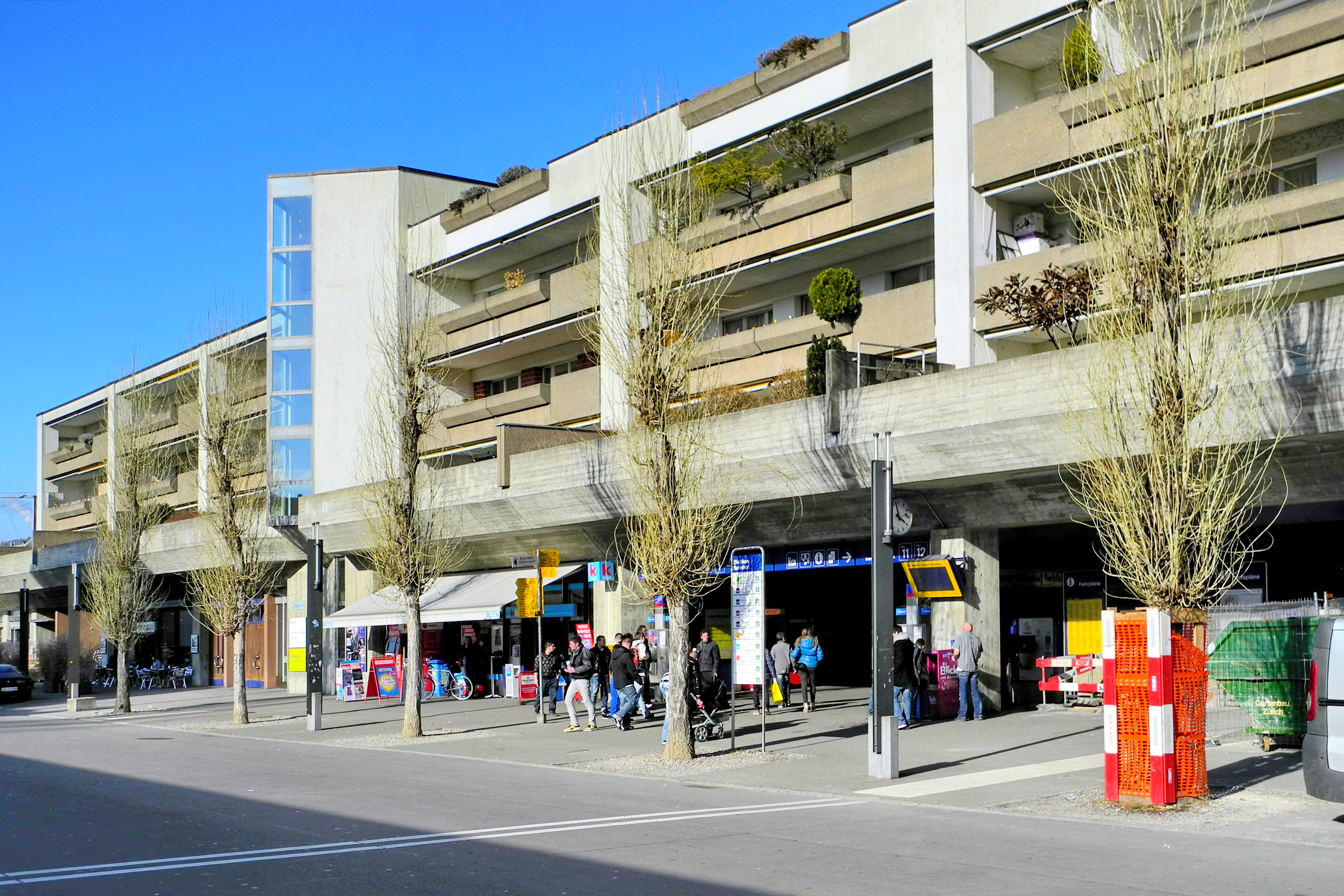
- The current station building in 2012

General information
- Location: Bahnhofplatz; Dietikon, Canton of Zürich; Switzerland
- Coordinates: 47°24′22″N 8°24′18″E
- Elevation: 388 m (1,273 ft)
- Owner: Swiss Federal Railways (since 1902); Schweizerische Nordostbahn (1853-1902); Schweizerische Nordbahn (1847-1853)
- Operator: Aargau Verkehr AG; Swiss Federal Railways
- Lines: Zurich–Baden railway line; Bremgarten–Dietikon railway line
- Platforms: 2 island platforms, 1 side platform
- Tracks: 5
- Train operators: Swiss Federal Railways
- Connections: ZVV
- Tram: AVA tram line 20
- Bus: VBZ bus lines 301 305 306 309 314

Other information
- Fare zone: 154 (ZVV)

History
- Opened: 1847
- Rebuilt: 1860s and 1970s

Passengers
- 2025: 21,200 per day (SBB, SOB)
- Rank: 34 out of 1,095 (Note: Tied with Brig railway station.)

Services
Preceding station	SBB CFF FFS	Following station
Baden towards Basel SBB	IR 36	Zürich Altstetten towards Zürich Airport
Preceding station	Zurich S-Bahn	Following station
Killwangen-Spreitenbach towards Aarau	S11	Glanzenberg towards Seuzach or Wila
Killwangen-Spreitenbach towards Brugg AG	S12	Glanzenberg towards Schaffhausen or Wil
Schöneggstrasse towards Wohlen	S17	Terminus
Wettingen towards Koblenz	S19	Zürich Altstetten towards Pfäffikon ZH
Othmarsingen towards Muri AG	S42	Zürich Altstetten towards Zürich HB
Killwangen-Spreitenbach towards Aarau	SN1 Limited service	Glanzenberg towards Winterthur
Killwangen-Spreitenbach towards Olten	SN11 Limited service	Glanzenberg towards Winterthur
Location
- Location within Switzerland Location within Canton of Zürich

Dietikon railway station (German: Bahnhof Dietikon) is a railway station in the Swiss canton of Zurich, situated in the city of Dietikon in the Limmat Valley. The station is located on the Swiss Federal Railway's Zürich to Olten main line and is also the terminus of the metre gauge Bremgarten–Dietikon railway (BD). The station lies within fare zone 154 of the Zürcher Verkehrsverbund (ZVV).

== History ==
The first station on the site was built by the Swiss Northern Railway in 1847, as part of their pioneering line from Zürich to Baden, and hence was one of the first railway stations in Switzerland. The original station building was constructed on the northern side of the railway line and still exists, albeit now used as a rail enthusiasts' club.

The original station was replaced in the 1860s by a new building on the southern, city centre, side of the line. This in turn was replaced in the 1970s by the current large station building on the same side of the line.

== Operation ==
The station has five through platforms on the main line, two terminal platforms on the Bremgarten–Dietikon railway (S17) and, since 2022, two terminal platforms on the Limmattal light rail line (Limmattalbahn), which is operated by AVA.

Whilst the Bremgarten–Dietikon terminal platforms are alongside their main line equivalents, trains approach them via street running track through the centre of Dietikon and across the station frontage. Also in the station frontage is a large covered bus station, used by local and regional bus services, and the Limmattalbahn (tram route 20), which operates between Altstetten and Killwangen-Spreitenbach over Dietikon using mostly its own tracks.

=== Services ===
As of the December 2023 timetable change, the following long-distance and S-Bahn services stop at Dietikon:

- InterRegio: hourly service between Zurich Airport and Basel SBB.
- Zurich S-Bahn:
  - S11: half-hourly service between Aarau and Winterthur; hourly service to Seuzach or Sennhof-Kyburg; rush-hour service to Wila.
  - S12: half-hourly service between Brugg AG and Winterthur; hourly service to Schaffhausen or Wil.
  - S17: half-hourly service to Wohlen via Bremgarten.
  - S19: hourly service to Koblenz via Baden (during peak hours), half-hourly to Effretikon (during peak hours to Pfäffikon ZH) via Zürich HB.
  - S42: peak-hour service between Muri AG and Zürich HB.

During the day, the three regular S-Bahn services (S11, S12, and S19) combine for six trains per hour to Zürich HB.

During weekends, there are also two nighttime S-Bahn services (SN1, SN11) calling at the station, offered by ZVV:

- SN1: on Friday and Saturday night, hourly service between Aarau and Winterthur via Zürich Stadelhofen.
- SN11: on Friday and Saturday night, hourly service between Winterthur and Olten.

Tram

Limmattalbahn line 20: Killwangen-Spreitenbach – Dietikon – Schlieren – Zürich Altstetten

== See also ==
- Rail transport in Switzerland
