= Spanisch Brötli =

Speciality pastry from Baden, Switzerland

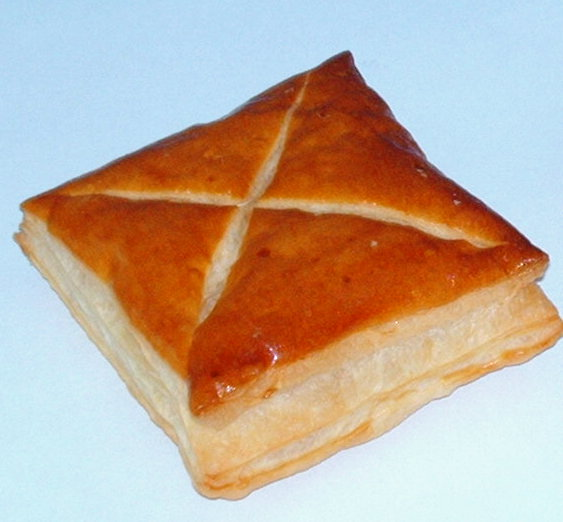
- Alternative names: Spanisch Brödli, Spanischbrötli, Spanischbrödli
- Type: Pastry
- Course: Dessert / snack
- Place of origin: Switzerland
- Region or state: Baden
- Serving temperature: At room temperature or just after cooling
- Main ingredients: Flour, hazelnuts, apricot jam

Spanisch Brötli (English: "Spanish bun", also known as Spanisch Brödli, Spanischbrötli or Spanischbrödli) is a speciality pastry from Baden, Switzerland. It is a light, flaky pastry filled with a mix of roasted, crushed hazelnuts and apricot jam. Its structure has a square of dough for the lower portion, apricot and hazelnut filling for the middle portion, and a square of dough for the upper portion. It has an "X" (or "cross") cut into the top to allow for the food to vent hot air during baking.

== History ==
Spanisch Brötli were first mentioned in a 1701 book by Samuel Hottinger about the city and baths of Baden. Brötli were very popular among the wealthy people of Zürich, so their servants had to travel 25 km to Baden by foot over night to purchase brötli in the early morning hours and bring them back to Zürich in time for breakfast.

In 1847 the Swiss Northern Railway was opened, connecting Zürich and Baden. This allowed Spanisch Brötli to be brought to Zürich in just 45 minutes, leading to the line being informally known as the Spanisch-Brötli-Bahn from then on.

During the 20th century these pastries fell out of favour and were almost forgotten until local bakeries revived the recipe in 2007, creating some new variants. Nowadays the pastry is sold under a trademark Spanischbrödli.

== See also ==
- Culinary Heritage of Switzerland
