= Schräglift Webermühle =

Inclined elevator in Wettingen, Aargau, Switzerland

Overview
- Status: In operation
- Locale: Wettingen, Aargau, Switzerland
- Coordinates: 47.458241°N 8.315261°E
- Termini: Webermühle (47.458192°N 8.315092°E); Wettingen at Alberich-Zwyssig-Strasse (47.45828°N 8.31538°E)
- Stations: 2

Service
- Type: Funicular (inclined elevator)
- Rolling stock: 1

History
- Opened: 15 September 2016 (8 years ago)
- Webermühle built: 1971
- Construction permit: 2011

Technical
- Electrification: from opening

Schräglift Webermühle is an inclined lift at Limmat river in Wettingen, Aargau, Switzerland. The lift connects the Webermühle residential area in Neuenhof to the Wettingen railway station above. It has a difference of elevation of 20 m. The lower station is located next to the pedestrian bridge to Webermühle. A footpath along the river leads to Spinnerei Wettingen. The upper station is on Alberich-Zwyssig-Strasse. It is open to the public during daytime.

== History ==
The lift was built by Inauen-Schätti in 2016 when the Webermühle building complex was restored. Initially planned for July 2016, it was open in September 2016. The construction permit was sought in 2011. The de-forested area was compensated.
