= Spreitenbach =

- Municipality
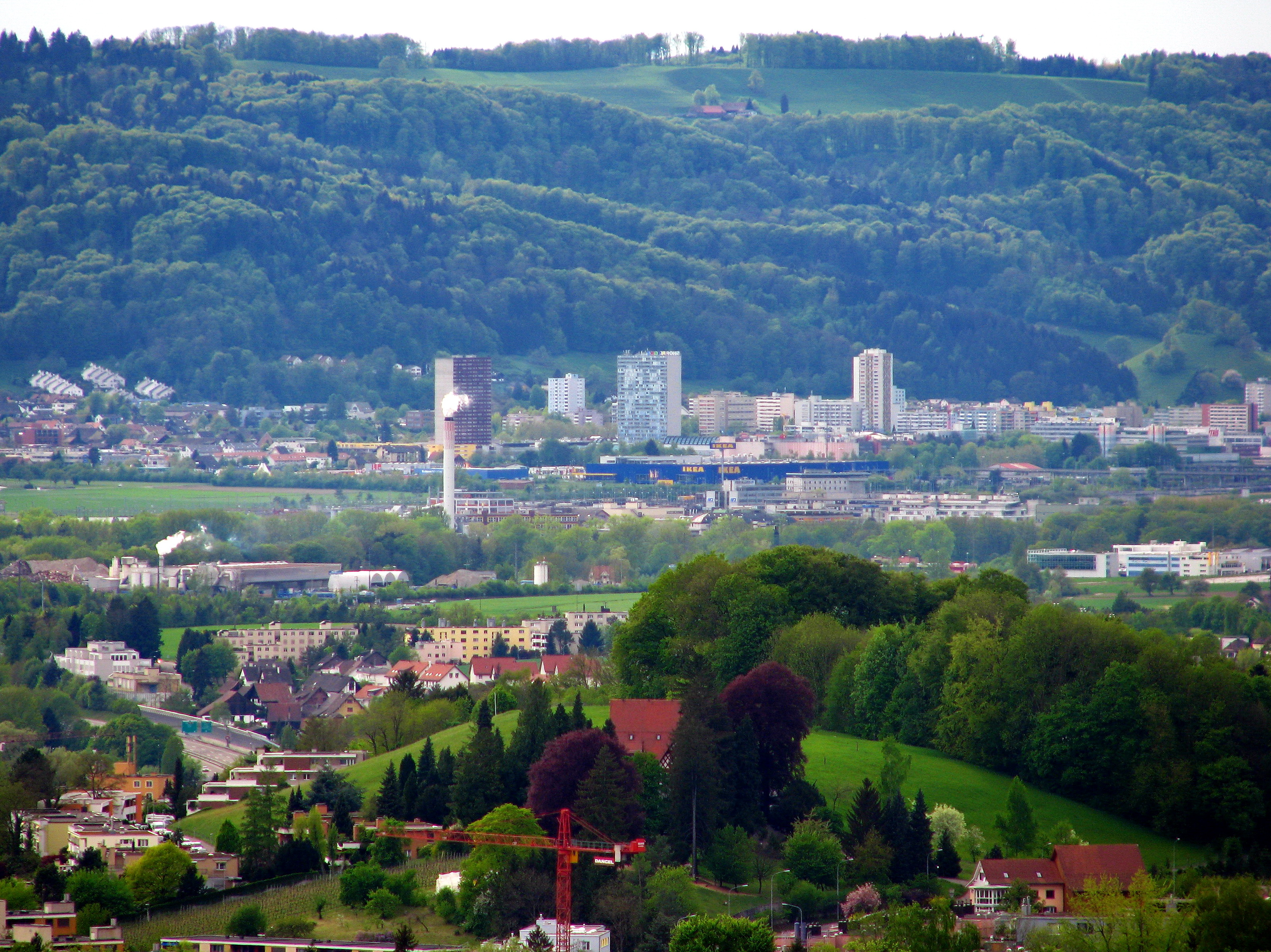

- Flag Coat of arms
- Location of Spreitenbach
- Location within Switzerland Location within Canton of Aargau
- Coordinates: 47°25′N 8°22′E
- Country: Switzerland
- Canton: Aargau
- District: Baden

Government
  - Mayor: Josef Bütler

Area
  - Total: 8.60 km^{2} (3.32 sq mi)
- Elevation: 421 m (1,381 ft)

Population (December 2020)
  - Total: 12,126
  - Density: 1,410/km^{2} (3,650/sq mi)
- Time zone: UTC+01:00 (CET)
  - Summer (DST): UTC+02:00 (CEST)
- Postal code: 8957
- SFOS number: 4040
- ISO 3166 code: CH-AG
- Surrounded by: Würenlos, Oetwil an der Limmat, Dietikon, Bergdietikon, Bellikon, Remetschwil, and Killwangen
- Twin towns: Bra (Italy)
- Website: www.spreitenbach.ch

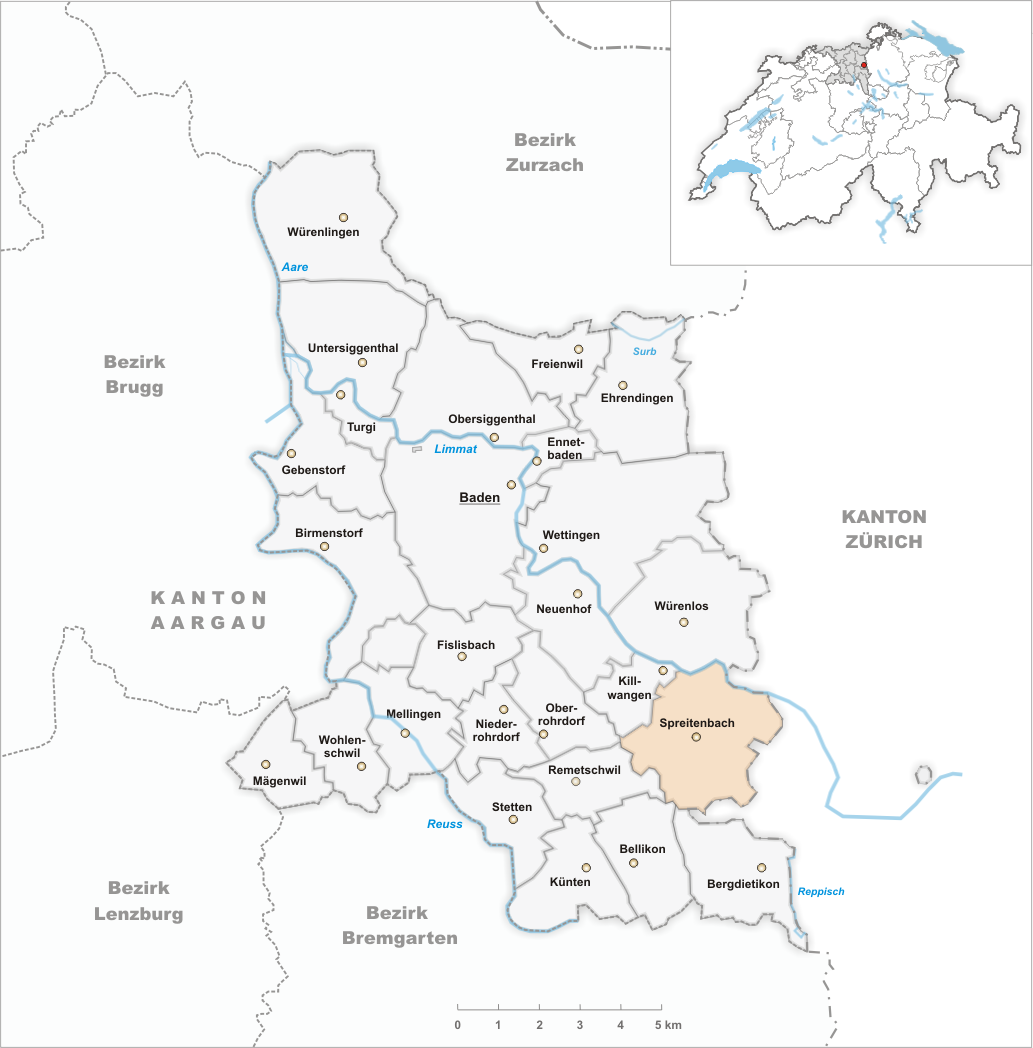
Spreitenbach

Spreitenbach (High Alemannic: Spräitebach) is a municipality in the district of Baden in the canton of Aargau in Switzerland, located in the Limmat Valley (German: Limmattal).

It lies southeast of the district center, directly on the border with the canton of Zurich. It is one of the smallest cities in Switzerland. In Switzerland, a city needs a population of 10,000 or more to be considered as a city.

== Geography ==
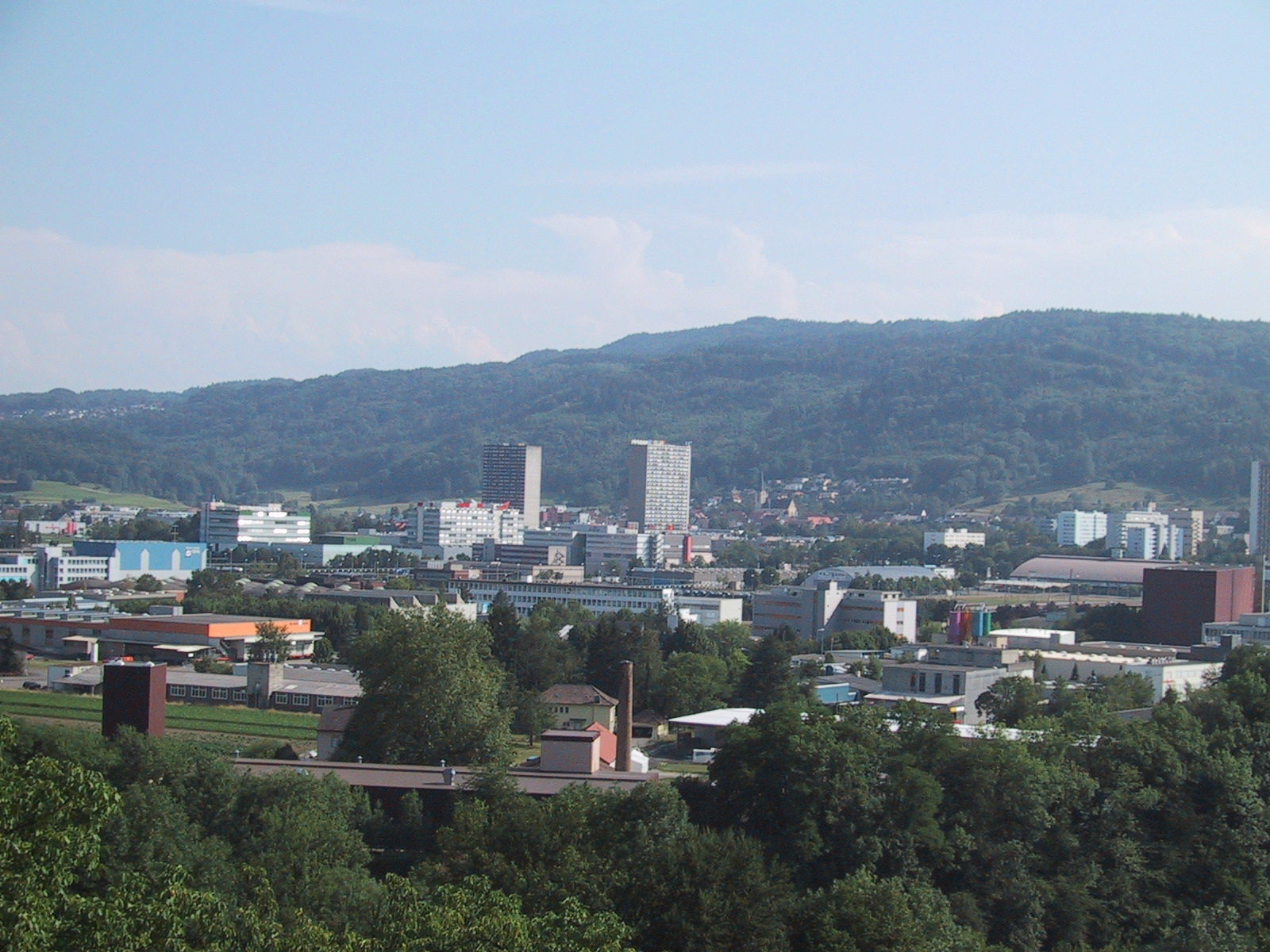
View from the north

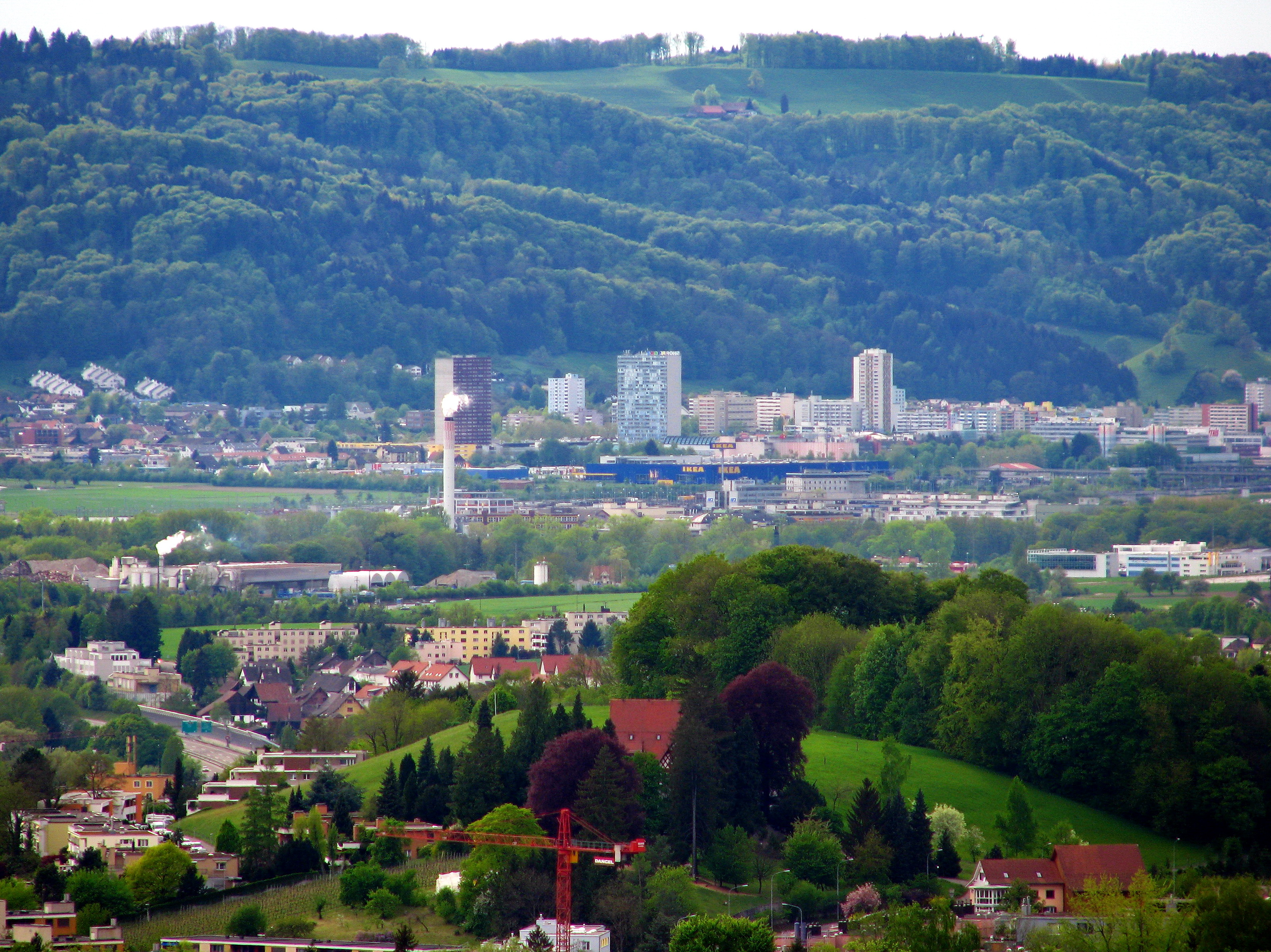
View from the east as seen from the Käferberg-Waidberg

The town lies between Baden and Zurich on the south side of the Limmat, located in the Limmat Valley. The settled area stretches along a plain between the Heitersberg and the waterfront. The old town center, through which the Spreitenbach stream flows, lies to the south and has preserved its original character well. North of that is the modern city, with wide apartment buildings, industrial areas, and shopping centers. The extended industrial zone Neuhard is located to the extreme north, across the motorway and railway, at a bend in the Limmat. The eastern part of the plain is dominated by the classification yard Zurich-Limmattal.

The Franzosenweiher ("French pond") lies in the forested area south of Spreitenbach, near the municipal border with Dietikon. The "Altes Bad" biotope is made up of a pool and a wetland with a great diversity of plants. The municipality has set aside this area and the neighboring forest as a protected natural zone. The name comes from the fact that Napoleon's troops camped at the pond, before crossing the Limmat at Kloster Fahr.

Around 2 km (1.2 mi) west of the town, at a height of 650 m (2,130 ft), lies Heitersberg, a hamlet set on a high plateau in the Heitersbergs. Not far from there is the highest point in the municipality (672 m (2,205 ft)). The lowest point, 385 m (1,263 ft), is the Limmat. Spreitenbach has an area, as of 2006, of 8.6 square kilometers (3.3 sq mi). Of this area, 27.8% is used for agricultural purposes, while 35.3% is forested. Of the rest of the land, 35.5% is settled (buildings or roads) and the remainder (1.4%) is non-productive (rivers or lakes).

== History ==
Aerial view from 300 m by Walter Mittelholzer (1923)

The first historical mention of Spreitenbach was in the year 1124. Along with many convents, the most distinguished landholders were the Knights of Schönenwerd (in Dietikon). They were forced to sell all of their farms to the Wettingen Abbey between 1274 and 1287.

In 1415 the Old Swiss Confederacy conquered Aargau and Spreitenbach was made part of the district of Dietikon in the County of Baden, a unit in the confederacy. In 1541 the Wettingen Abbey acquired low justice. In 1670 and again in 1785, many of the houses in the town were destroyed in fires. In March 1798, France invaded Switzerland and declared the Helvetic Republic. Spreitenbach became a municipality in the short-lived canton of Baden; since 1803 the municipality has been in the canton of Aargau.

On August 9, 1847 the railway between Zurich and Baden was opened. The citizens of Spreitenbach lobbied for the path to go far to the side of the city; for this reason, the nearest station today is in the municipality of Killwangen, although it has about seven times fewer residents. Industrialization began in 1862 with the opening of a cotton spinning works.

In the 1950s, Spreitenbach was still a quiet farming town with a small business community and a gliderport. However, a major construction boom followed. In the canton of Zurich, then forbidding concubinage (i.e. unmarried cohabitation, banned until 1972), the demand rose for housing in the canton of Aargau, especially in Spreitenbach. This was in addition to the general housing demand, which rose due to the population growth of the Zurich area. A "New Spreitenbach" was planned and built. It was planned as a satellite city: a string of high-rise developments and designated commercial and industrial zones. In the middle of the 1960s, the planners anticipated a population of 35,000 and 20,000 jobs at the end of the construction. Because of the oil embargo and the economic crisis of the 1970s, the vision changed to a more modest development. In 1981 a new construction zone plan was designated, which had a less dense settlement plan and turned away from high rises.

In 1970 the first American-style shopping mall in Switzerland opened. In 1974, a second, larger one followed. Spreitenbach served as a negative example for urban sprawl on the Swiss Plateau. Between 1960 and today, the population has more than quintupled. No other municipality in the canton has registered such a large growth in recent times.

== Coat of arms ==
The blazon of the municipal coat of arms is: "Geviert von Blau mit gekröntem gelbem Leopardenkopf und von Rot mit sechsstrahligem weissem Stern" ("Quarterly, Azure, a crowned leopard head Or; Gules, a six-pointed star Argent"). On the coat of arms from the municipal seal from 1872, a linden and a fir were pictured. Today's coat of arms comes from a recommendation of the local historians and was adopted in 1930. It appears on a map of the canton of Zurich from 1667. The leopard head alludes to the Schönenwerd nobility, and the star to the Wettingen Abbey, the former judges.

== Demographics ==
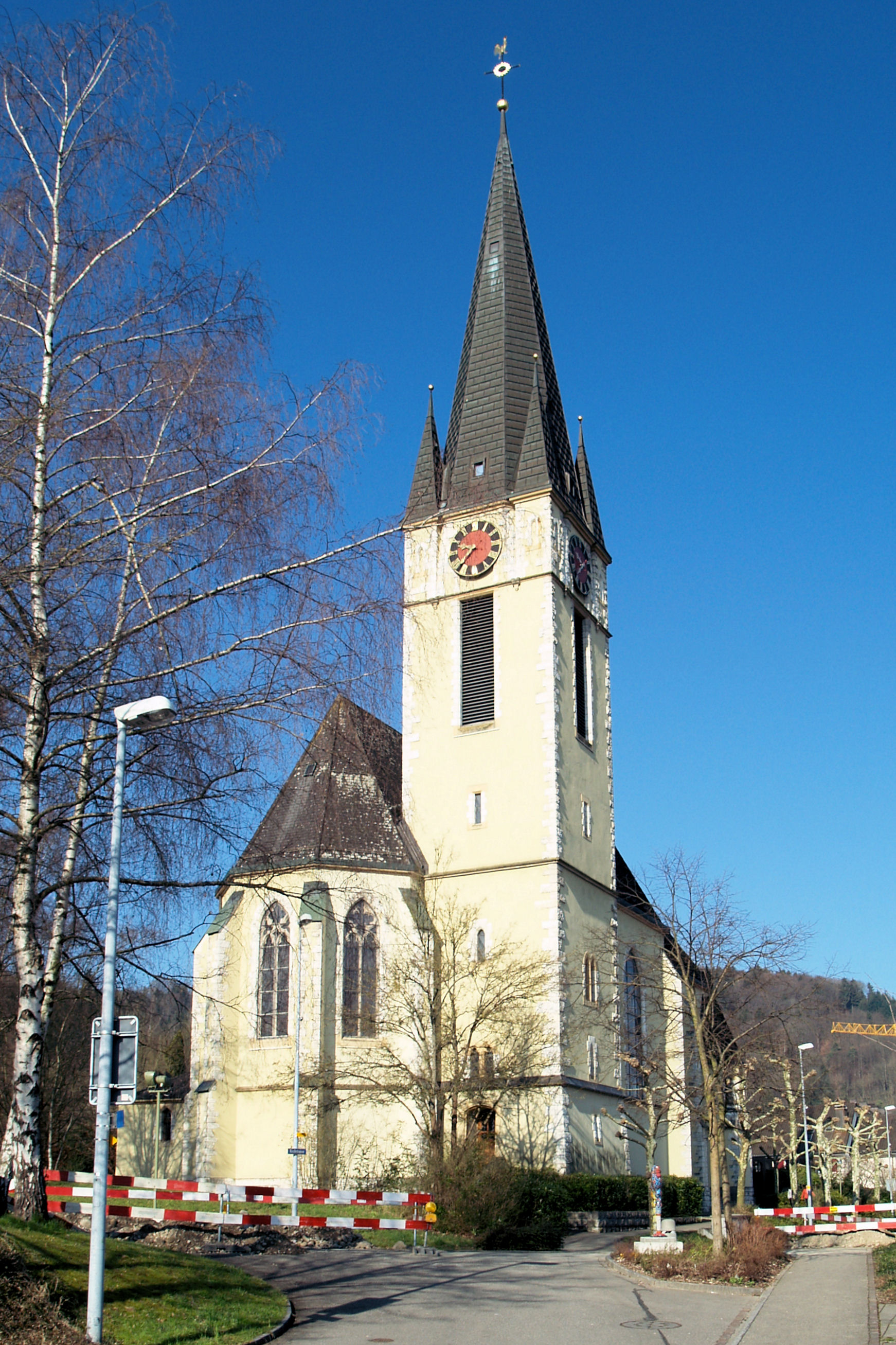
Roman Catholic Church in Spreitenbach

Historical population
Year	Pop.	±%
1780	383	—
1850	669	+74.7%
1900	913	+36.5%
1930	1,064	+16.5%
1950	1,173	+10.2%
1960	1,964	+67.4%
1970	5,978	+204.4%
1980	7,198	+20.4%
1990	8,315	+15.5%
2000	9,127	+9.8%
2007	10,268	+12.5%

Spreitenbach has a population (as of 31 December 2020) of 12,126. As of 2008, 50.5% of the population was made up of foreign nationals. Over the last 10 years the population has grown at a rate of 18.5%. Most of the population (as of 2000) speaks German (72.1%), with Italian being second most common ( 7.0%) and Serbo-Croatian being third ( 6.1%).

In the 2000 census, 40.0% were Roman Catholic, 20.4% were Reformed, 7.9% were Orthodox, 14.7% Muslim, and 1.3% of some other religion. As their principal language 72.1% spoke German, 7.0% Italian, 6.1% Serbo-Croatian, 4.8% Albanian, 2.3% Turkish, 1.2% Spanish, and 1.1% each French and Portuguese.

The age distribution, as of 2008, in Spreitenbach is; 1,161 children or 11.0% of the population are between 0 and 9 years old and 1,204 teenagers or 11.4% are between 10 and 19. Of the adult population, 1,768 people or 16.7% of the population are between 20 and 29 years old. 1,628 people or 15.4% are between 30 and 39, 1,685 people or 15.9% are between 40 and 49, and 1,435 people or 13.6% are between 50 and 59. The senior population distribution is 963 people or 9.1% of the population are between 60 and 69 years old, 502 people or 4.8% are between 70 and 79, there are 178 people or 1.7% who are between 80 and 89, and there are 44 people or 0.4% who are 90 and older.

As of 2000, there were 715 homes with 1 or 2 persons in the household, 2,506 homes with 3 or 4 persons in the household, and 560 homes with 5 or more persons in the household. The average number of people per household was 2.36 individuals. In 2008 there were 480 single family homes (or 10.7% of the total) out of a total of 4,472 homes and apartments. There were a total of 39 empty apartments for a 0.9% vacancy rate. As of 2007, the construction rate of new housing units was 1.9 new units per 1000 residents.

== Politics ==
The elected municipal assembly has legislative duties. The executive authority is the municipal council. Its members have a four-year term and are chosen by majority vote of the people. The council represents and leads the municipality, and for that purpose execute the resolutions of the assembly and the responsibilities assigned by the canton and the federation.

The five members of the municipal council for the 2006–2009 term are:

- Joseph Bütler (FDP), Mayor
- Peter Hautle (SVP), Vice-mayor
- Fredy Nüesch (SP)
- Monika Zeindler (not affiliated)
- Stefan Nipp (CVP)

Legal disputes are handled by the Baden court. Spreitenbach belongs to the judicial district of Wettingen.

In the 2007 federal election the most popular party was the SVP which received 42.8% of the vote. The next three most popular parties were the SP (19.6%), the CVP (13.8%) and the FDP (9.8%).

== Economy ==
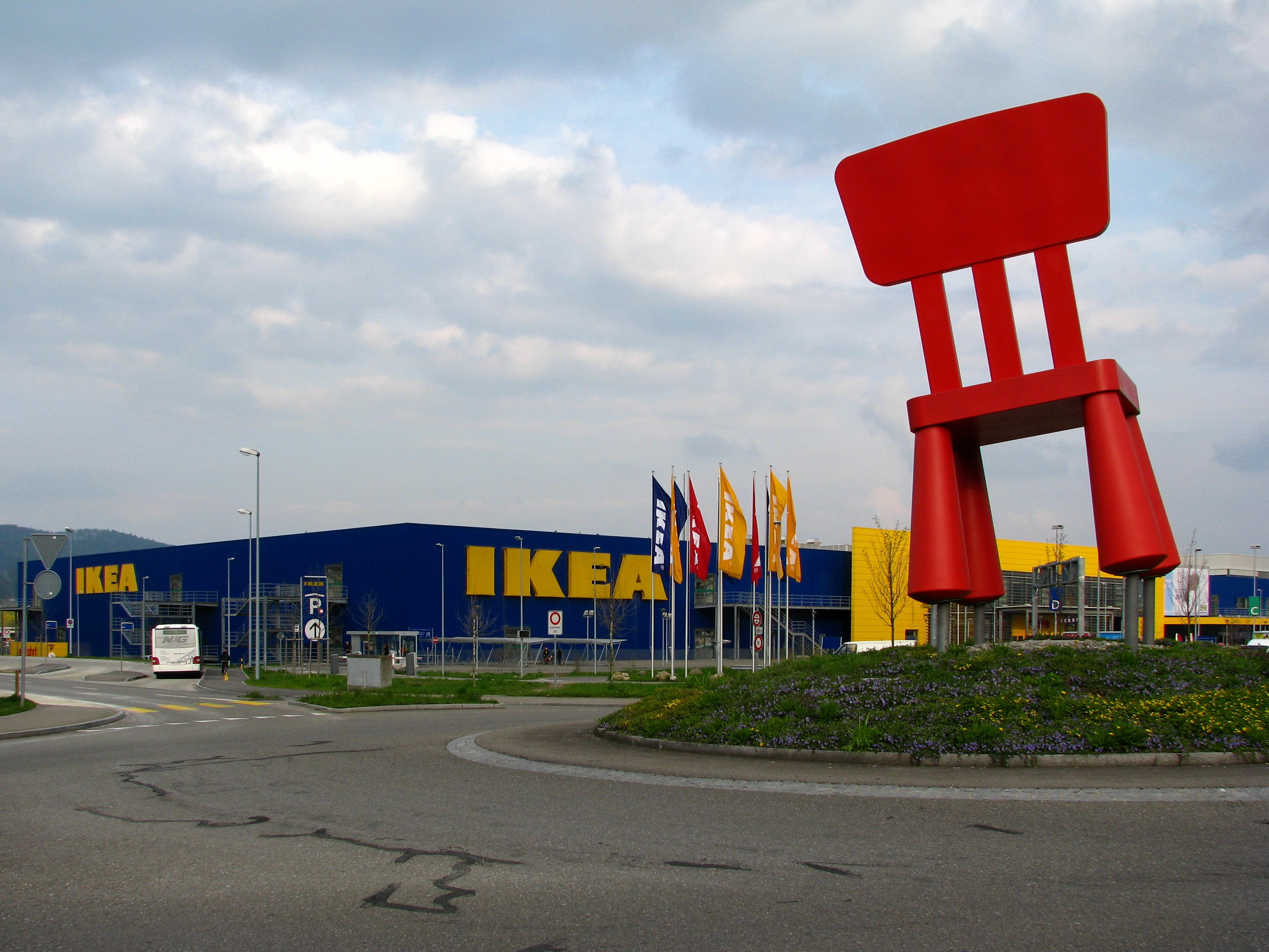
IKEA in Spreitenbach

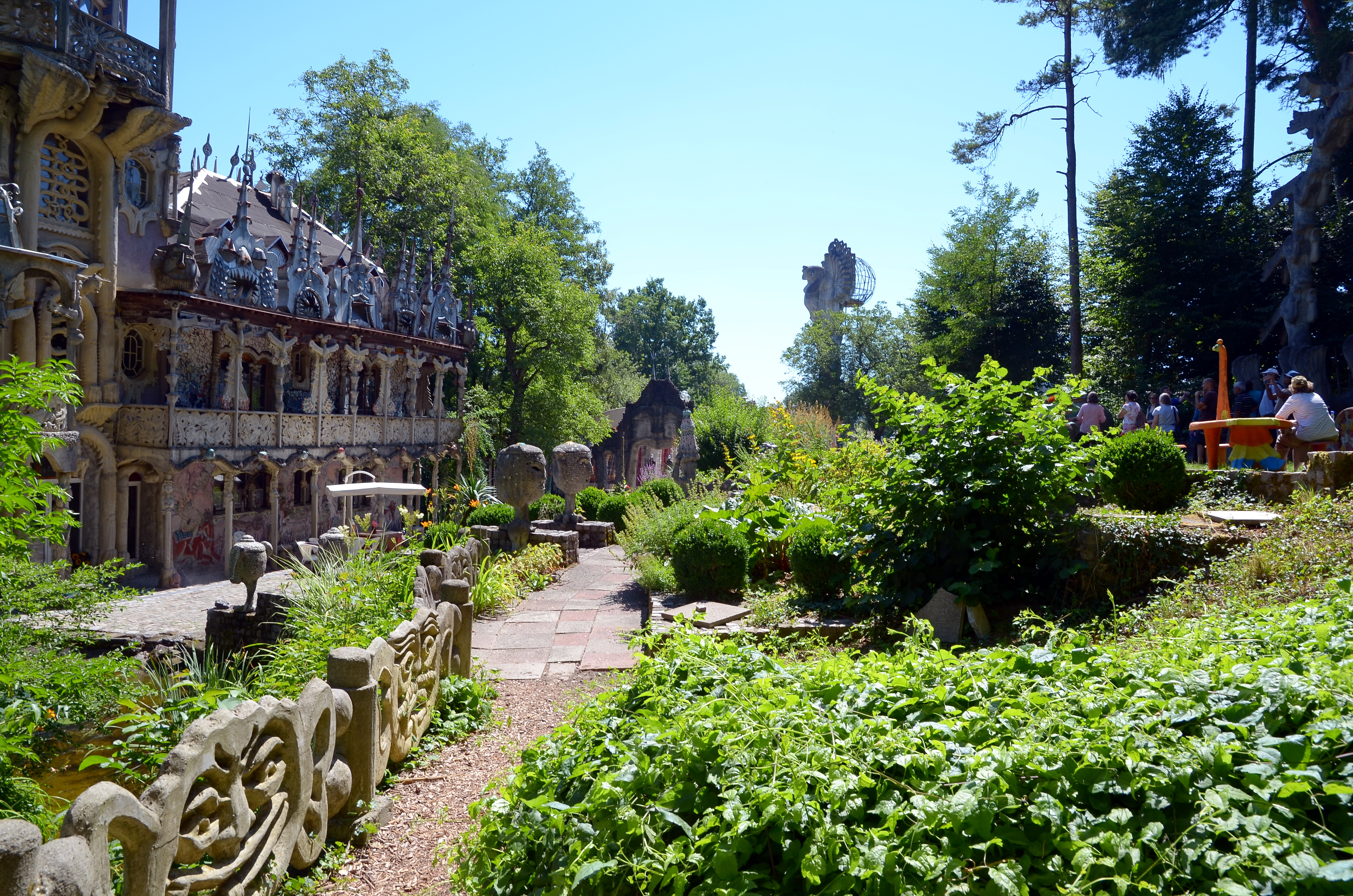
Bruno Weber Park

Spreitenbach is a distinguished economic area, because of its protruding position in the west of the Zurich metropolitan area. Over 700 businesses employ about 6900 workers. Of these 1% are in the agricultural sector, 22% in the industrial sector, and 77% in the service sector. The two large shopping centers Shoppi and Tivoli as well as the furniture store IKEA (the first store opened outside of Scandinavia, in 1973), form the backbone of the service economy. Several leading companies operate in Spreitenbach; the most notable are Zweifel Pomy-Chips (potato chips), Bridgestone (car tires), Johnson & Johnson (pharmacy/cosmetics), Nestlé (foodstuffs), Miele (household goods), and Globus (retail trade).

As of 2000 there was a total of 5,192 workers who lived in the municipality. Of these, 3,709 or about 71.4% of the residents worked outside Spreitenbach while 4,327 people commuted into the municipality for work. There were a total of 5,810 jobs (of at least 6 hours per week) in the municipality.

== Transportation ==
The municipality is located near the A3 motorway, and an on ramp is planned. The municipality lies on the frequently used Zurich-Baden highway. The Dietikon entrance to the A1 autobahn lies 2 km east of the town. Until 2008 Spreitenbach will have only an entrance in one direction (from and toward Bern). In Spreitenbach and its neighbor Dietikon, the largest classification yard of the region was built in 1978 (later expanded), the Rangierbahnhof-Limmattal (RBL).

Spreitenbach can be reached from several bus lines, which end there. The lines 2, 4, and 8 of the Regionale Verkehrsbetriebe Baden-Wettingen go in the direction of Killwangen, Neuenhof, Wettingen, and Baden. A line of the ZVV goes to Zurich via Dietikon, Urdorf, and Sclieren. The entrance on the S-Bahn Zürich lies in the nearby Killwangen-Spreitenbach railway station and Dietikon railway station (lines S3 and S12). In the medium term, the new Stadtbahn Limmattal is being planned to include stops in Spreitenbach.

== Education ==
In Spreitenbach all of the levels of obligatory primary schooling are taught. The nearest Kantonsschule (Gymnasium) is in Wettingen or Baden.

In Spreitenbach about 57.2% of the population (between age 25-64) have completed either non-mandatory upper secondary education or additional higher education (either university or a Fachhochschule). Of the school age population (in the 2008/2009 school year), there are 724 students attending primary school, there are 369 students attending secondary school, there are 186 students attending tertiary or university level schooling in the municipality.

== Heritage sites of national significance ==
The Moosweg, a Neolithic grave site is listed as a Swiss heritage site of national significance.

== Notable people ==
- Bruno Weber (1931–2011) a Swiss artist and architect, specializing in fantastic realism built Bruno Weber Park, a sculpture park in Spreitenbach and Dietikon
- Diego Benaglio (born 1983) grew up in Spreitenbach, a Swiss football goalkeeper, played almost 400 club games, most for VfL Wolfsburg and played 61 games for the Switzerland national football team
