= Zurich–Baden railway line =

Major railway line in Switzerland

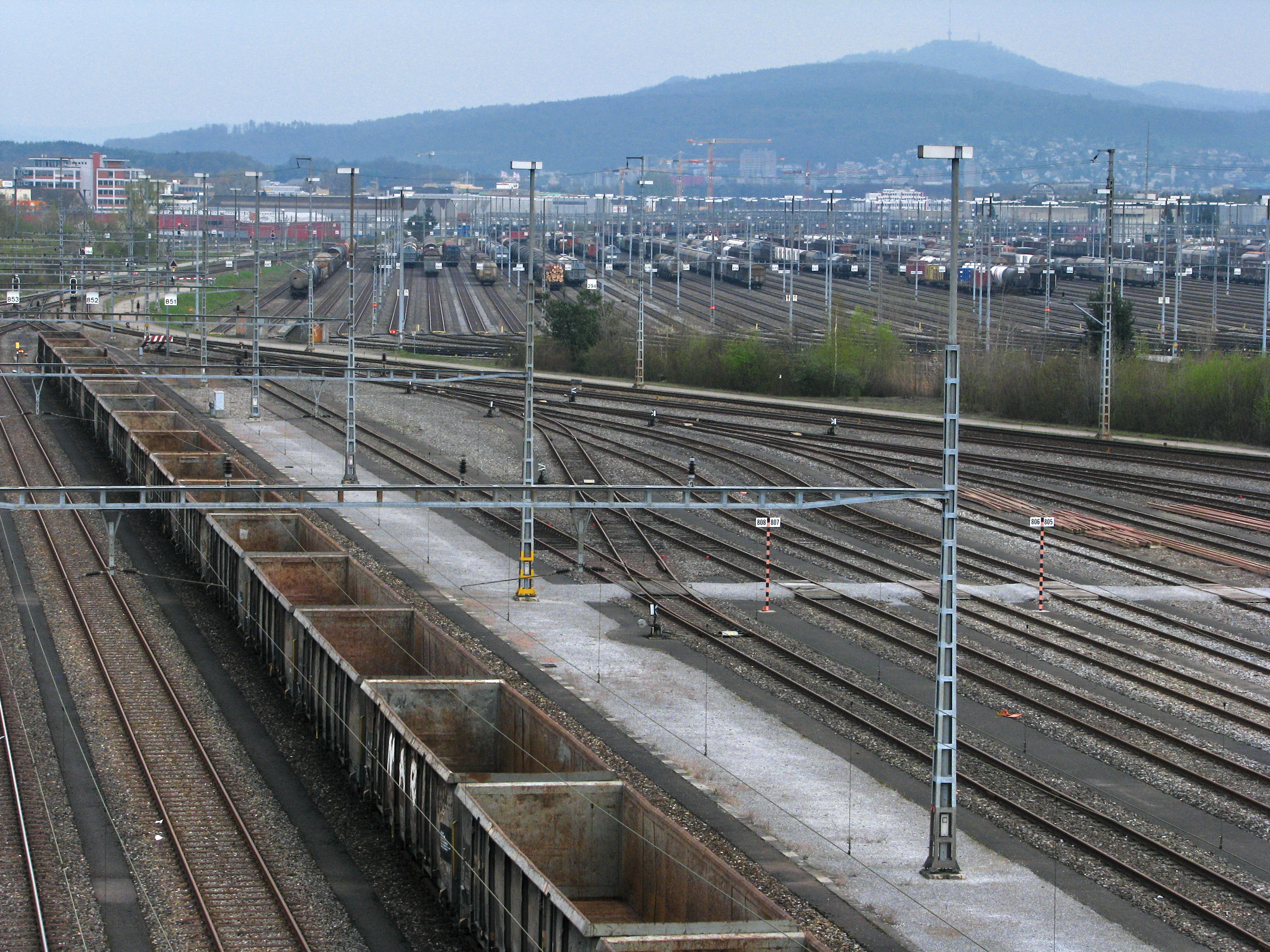
- Limmattal marshalling yard

Overview
- Line number: 650, 700, 710
- Locale: Switzerland
- Termini: Zürich Hauptbahnhof; Baden

Technical
- Line length: 22.5 km (14.0 mi)
- Num of tracks: 2-4
- Track gauge: 1,435 mm (4 ft 8 1/2 in)
- Electrification: 15 kV/16.7 Hz AC overhead catenary

The Zurich–Baden railway line is a major railway line in Switzerland connecting the cities of Zurich and Baden. It forms part of the major east–west route between Zurich and Olten. The line generally follows the south bank of the Limmat from Zurich to Baden. A new line, the Heitersberg line, opened in 1975, branches off in Killwangen-Spreitenbach and follows a more southerly route through the Heitersberg Tunnel towards Olten. The Zurich–Baden railway is electrified at 15 kV 16.7 Hz and much of it has four tracks.

The section between Zurich and Baden was opened in 1847 and was the first line opened in Switzerland, apart from a line from Mulhouse, France to Basel. The line was extended from Baden to Olten in 1858.

== History ==
The line between Zurich and Baden was opened on 7 August 1847 by the Swiss Northern Railway (German: Schweizerische Nordbahn, SNB). It was the first line built in Switzerland, except for the line built from Mulhouse to Basel by the French company, Strasbourg–Basel Railway (French: Chemin de fer de Strasbourg à Bâle), opened to a temporary station outside Basel's walls on 15 June 1844 and to the permanent station on 11 December 1845. The construction of railways in Switzerland was delayed compared to most of its neighbours, partly as a result of its mountainous geography. In 1837, the Zurich Chamber of Commerce commissioned the engineer Alois Negrelli to investigate the route of such a line. In October of the same year the Zurich-Basel railway company was founded. The chosen route would lead from Zurich to Würenlos via Dietikon along the south bank of the Limmat, then cross the river to follow the north bank of the Limmat follow Wettingen, Ennetbaden and Obersiggenthal. In Untersiggenthal the line would turn to the north and have crossed the Aare at Döttingen. It would have then followed the south bank of the Rhine to Basel. In April 1838 surveying of the route began, but angry residents obstructed their work. The Züriputsch of 1839 and a civil war-like Constitutional dispute in the canton of Aargau further delayed the start of construction. Although the Aargau parliament passed a law permitting compulsory purchase in November 1840, several shareholders lost their financial guarantees, and the company had to be dissolved in December 1841.

In May 1845 a new committee was formed under the leadership of the Zurich industrialist Martin Escher. The planned line would now keep to the south bank of the Limmat, which it would only cross at Turgi. Finally, it was planned to cross the Rhine between Koblenz and Waldshut (then in the nation of Baden) to connect with the planned Baden Mainline between Basel and Konstanz. With an assurance that Alois Negrelli would be direct the engineering and that a branch line would be later built from Baden to Lenzburg and Aarau, the Aargau parliament approved the project in July 1845. The first stage of construction would be the section from Zurich to Baden. Negrelli relocated of the station in Baden to the north side of town, requiring the construction of the 80-meter-long Schlossberg tunnel. Gustav Albert Wegmann designed the Zurich railway station, while Ferdinand Stadler designed the Baden station. At the end of 1845 the Nordbahn company was founded with a share capital of 20 million francs, in the spring of 1846 construction work started. The route for the most part was easy, although there were small landslides between Neuenhof and Baden. The greatest challenge was the construction of the Schlossberg tunnel, where prisoners were initially used for this work, later unskilled workers were also used there. There were three fatalities in a blasting accident and an additional six workers died of typhoid. The tunnel was broken through on 14 April 1847.

The line opened on 7 August 1847 with four trips in each direction. The 20 km journey took 45 minutes with the trains stopping at Altstetten, Schlieren and Dietikon. Soon after the opening of the line began to be called the "Spanisch-Brötli bahn" ("Spanish bun railway") because the Zurich gentry sent their servants by train to Baden to buy these pastries in order to impress their clients at Sunday morning teas. The railway was not a commercial success. Its passenger numbers were reduced by the Sonderbund War and the Revolutions of 1848 in neighboring countries. The Nordbahn dropped one of the daily services and indefinitely delayed the construction of further stages. Construction of the branch line from Baden to Lenzburg and Aarau was abandoned.

=== Extension to Brugg and Olten ===
Only after the enactment of the Federal Railways Act of 1852—made possible by the new constitution of 1848—and the merger of the company with Alfred Escher's Lake Constance and Rhine Falls Railway (German: Bodensee und Rheinfallbahnen) to form the Swiss Northeast Railway (German: Schweizerische Nordostbahn, NOB) in 1853 were construction plans resumed. The Baden–Aarau railway was opened between Baden and Brugg on 30 September 1856 and extended to Aarau on 15 May 1858, where it met the line from Olten built by the Schweizerische Centralbahn. The line was incorporated in the Swiss Federal Railways on 1 January 1902. The whole line from Zurich to Olten was electrified on 25 January 1925.

=== Heitersberg Tunnel ===
On 23 June 1874 the Aargau Southern Railway (German: Aargauische Südbahn, AS) was opened from Rupperswil to Wohlen as part of the project to connect the Gotthard Railway to Olten and Basel, largely for freight trains. On 6 September 1877 the Swiss National Railway (German: Schweizerische Nationalbahn) opened a line from Wettingen to Zofingen as part of a plan to connect Singen, Germany and Lake Geneva in competition with the established railway companies. The line went bankrupt in 1878 and was taken over by the NOB. Part of this line between Mellingen and Gexi junction (near Hendschiken) together with the AS line between Gexi junction and Rupperswil was incorporated into the current main line between Zurich and Olten when a shorter and straighter line between Killwangen-Spreitenbach and Rupperswil was opened through the 4,929 m (16,171 ft) long Heitersberg Tunnel on 22 May 1975.
