= Regionale Verkehrsbetriebe Baden-Wettingen =

Transport company in Switzerland

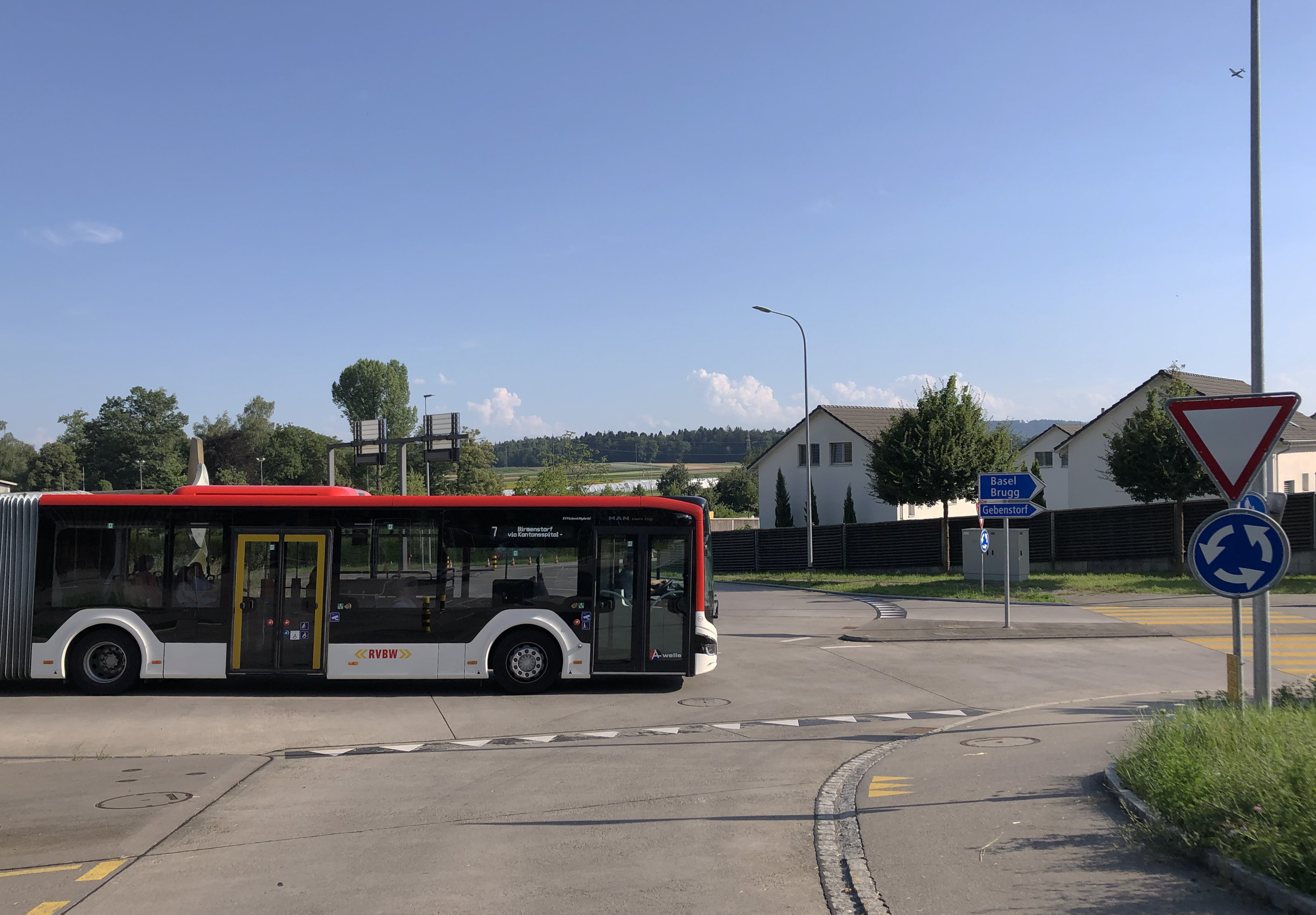
- Locale: Baden, Aargau
- Routes: 12
- Website: www.rvbw.ch
System map
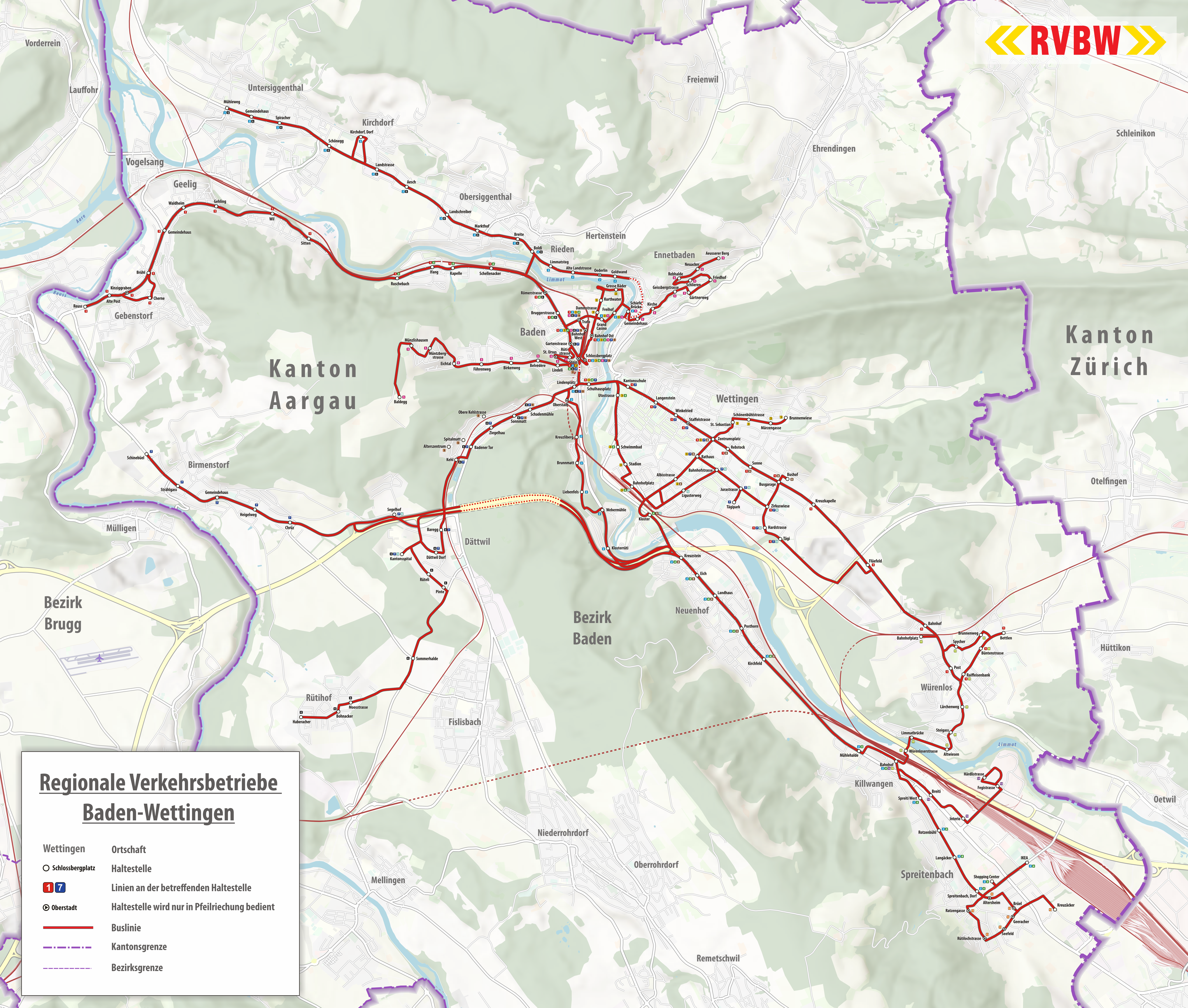

Regionale Verkehrsbetriebe Baden-Wettingen is the main operator of bus services to the District of Baden in the Canton of Aargau, Switzerland.

== Bus Operations ==
The company operates 63 buses, on 12 commercial routes, in the area.

It also operates a network of night bus services, branded as Nachtwelle.

== Routes ==
Line	Route
1	Gebenstorf – Kappelerhof Baden SBB – Wettingen EW – Würenlos
2	Untersiggenthal – Obersiggenthal – Ennetbaden – Baden SBB – Neuenhof – Killwangen – Spreitenbach
3	Brunnenwiese – Wettingen EW – Wettingen SBB – Baden SBB
4	Baden Ruschebach – Baden SBB – Wettingen SBB – Neuenhof – Killwangen – Spreitenbach
5	Äusserer Berg – Ennetbaden – Baden SBB – Baldegg
6	Untersiggenthal – Obersiggenthal – Baden SBB – Dättwil – Rütihof
7	Birmenstorf – Dättwil – Baden SBB – Wettingen EW – Tägi
8	Busgarage – Wettingen EW – Neuenhof
9	Kraftwerk – ThermalBaden – Baden SBB – Kehl
10	Killwangen – Härdlistrasse
11	Würenlos – Killwangen
12	Kantonsspital Baden - Wettingen Bahnhof – Tägi

== Rolling stock ==
- 21 Lion's City G
- 10 Lion's City GL
- 7 Lion's City
- 4 Lion's City M
- 1 Lions City Hybrid
- 8 Hess-Scania Low-Entry 12m
- 6 Hess-Scania Low Entry 18m
- 2 Sprinter City 35
- 2 Sprinter City 65

== See also ==
- Transport in Switzerland
- List of bus operating companies in Switzerland
