= Killwangen =

- Municipality
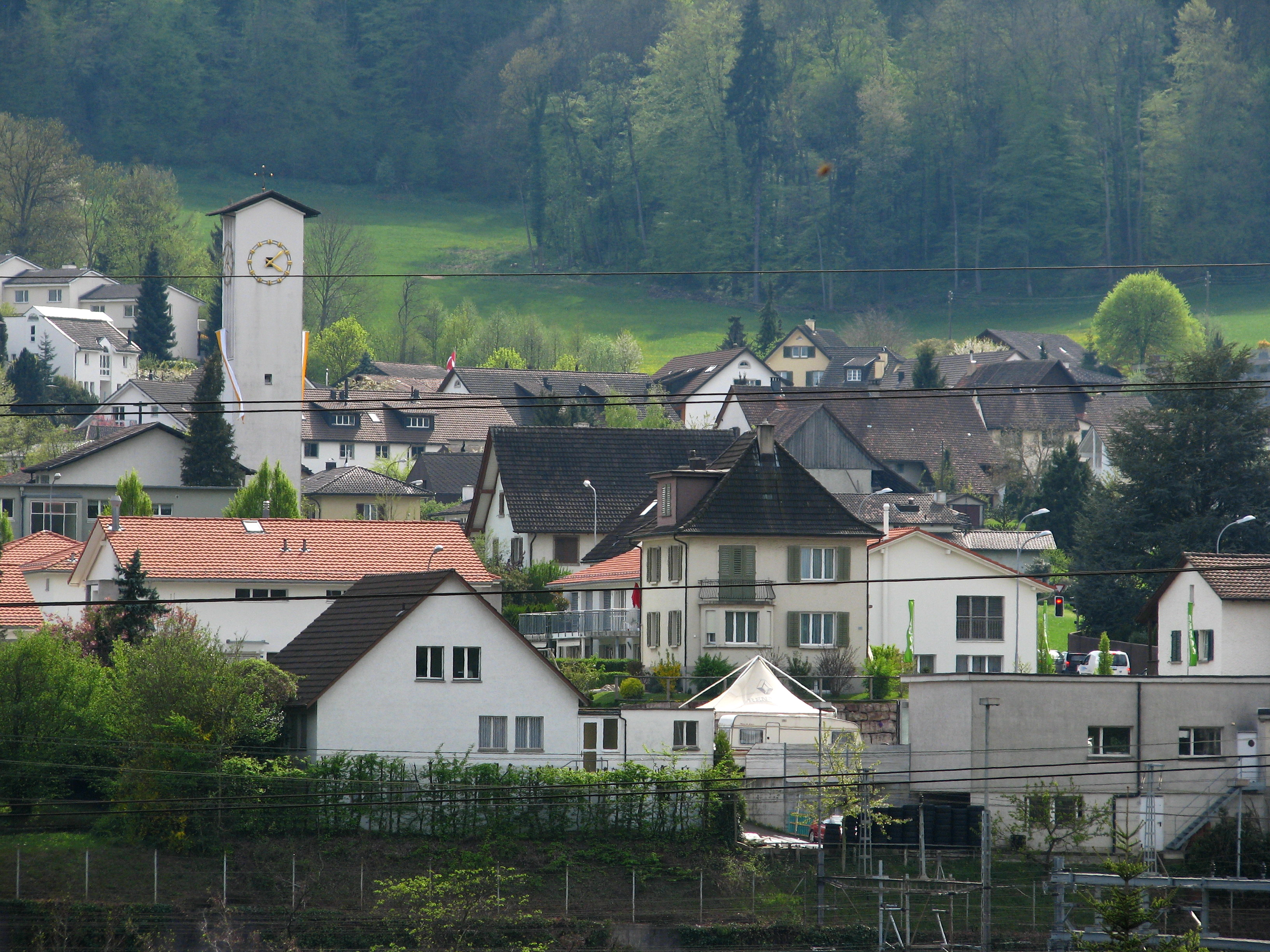

- Flag Coat of arms
- Location of Killwangen
- Location within Switzerland Location within Canton of Aargau
- Coordinates: 47°26′N 8°21′E
- Country: Switzerland
- Canton: Aargau
- District: Baden

Area
  - Total: 2.43 km^{2} (0.94 sq mi)
- Elevation: 393 m (1,289 ft)

Population (December 2020)
  - Total: 2,051
  - Density: 844/km^{2} (2,190/sq mi)
- Time zone: UTC+01:00 (CET)
  - Summer (DST): UTC+02:00 (CEST)
- Postal code: 8956
- SFOS number: 4030
- ISO 3166 code: CH-AG
- Surrounded by: Neuenhof, Oberrohrdorf, Spreitenbach, Würenlos
- Website: killwangen.ch

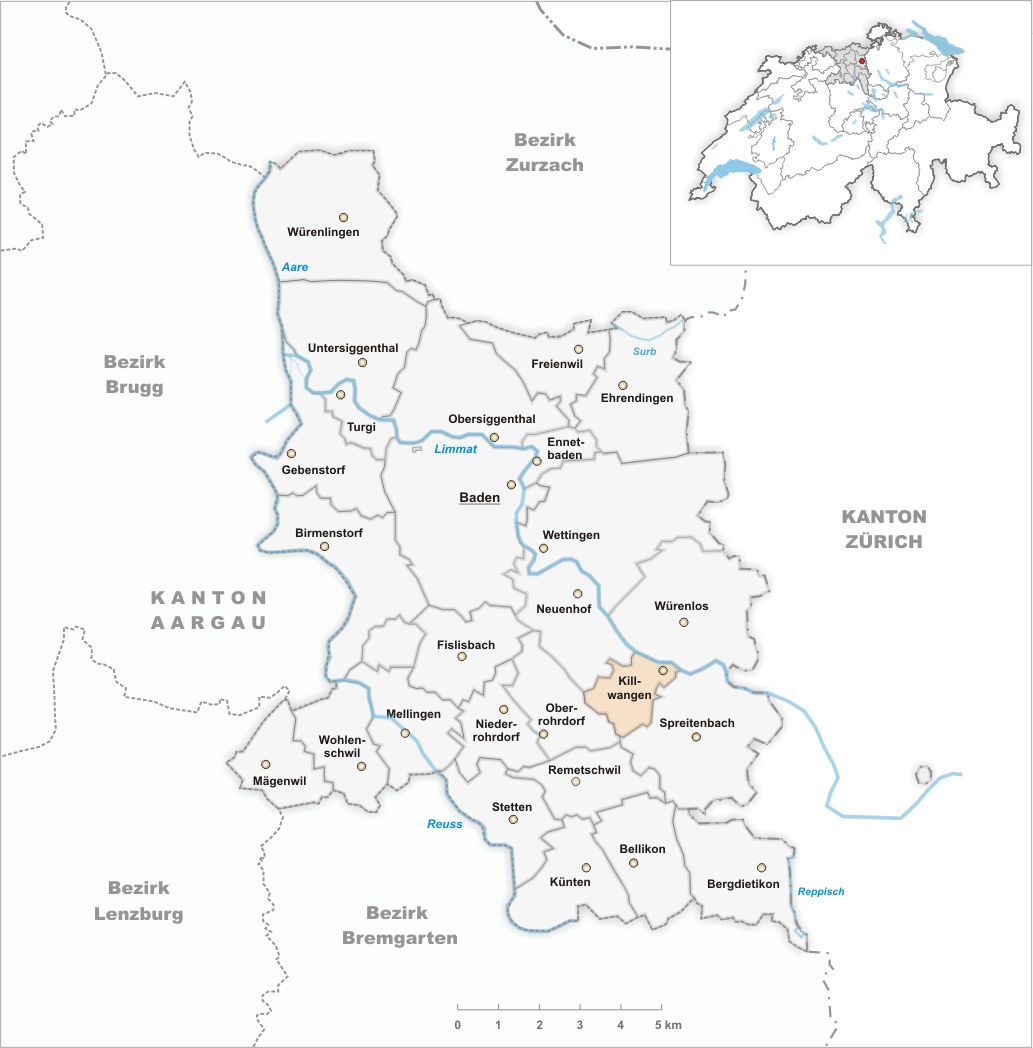
Killwangen

Killwangen is a municipality in the district of Baden in the canton of Aargau in Switzerland.

== History ==
The town was first known as Chullewangen as early as 1227. The name is alemannish in origin. For nearly 600 years, Killwangen was dependent on the monastery in nearby Wettingen. In 1798, Napoleon's troops came through Switzerland and the Helvetic Republic was born. Killwangen was part of the Canton of Baden which enjoyed a short history as a separate Canton, being absorbed by the new Canton of Aargau in 1803. On 7 August 1847, the first railway line in Switzerland opened between Baden and Zurich. On 1 February 1848, the town received its own railways station on the pioneer line.

== Geography ==
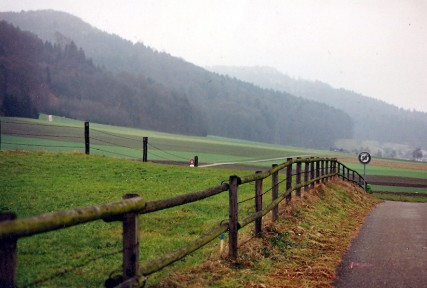
Fields outside Killwangen

Aerial view (1965)

Killwangen has an area, as of 2006, of 2.4 km^{2} (0.93 sq mi). Of this area, 27.6% is used for agricultural purposes, while 50.6% is forested. Of the rest of the land, 19.3% is settled (buildings or roads) and the remainder (2.5%) is non-productive (rivers or lakes).

The town lies in the Limmat Valley between Baden and Zürich. Killwangen lies on the south side of the Limmat river, within easy walking distance of the Heitersberg. Elevation of the Limmat at Killwangen is 385 m (1,263 ft) a.s.l. The highest point in Killwangen is the Sennenberg ridge at 702 m (2,303 ft). Neighboring towns are Würenlos to the North, Spreitenbach to the east, Neuenhof to the West and Oberrohrdorf to the south.

== Coat of arms ==
The blazon of the municipal coat of arms is Gules a Mullet Argent under a Chevron rose of the same.

== Demographics ==
Killwangen has a population (as of 31 December 2020) of 2,051. As of 2008, 23.6% of the population was made up of foreign nationals. Over the last 10 years the population has grown at a rate of 30.7%. Most of the population (as of 2000) speaks German (88.2%), with Italian being second most common ( 2.7%) and Serbo-Croatian being third ( 1.9%).

The age distribution, as of 2008, in Killwangen is; 175 children or 9.8% of the population are between 0 and 9 years old and 180 teenagers or 10.1% are between 10 and 19. Of the adult population, 249 people or 14.0% of the population are between 20 and 29 years old. 244 people or 13.7% are between 30 and 39, 319 people or 17.9% are between 40 and 49, and 274 people or 15.4% are between 50 and 59. The senior population distribution is 192 people or 10.8% of the population are between 60 and 69 years old, 99 people or 5.6% are between 70 and 79, there are 43 people or 2.4% who are between 80 and 89, and there are 6 people or 0.3% who are 90 and older.

As of 2000, there were 49 homes with 1 or 2 persons in the household, 257 homes with 3 or 4 persons in the household, and 229 homes with 5 or more persons in the household. The average number of people per household was 2.44 individuals. In 2008 there were 294 single family homes (or 37.8% of the total) out of a total of 778 homes and apartments.

The historical population is given in the following table:

Historical population
Year	Pop.	±%
1778	90	—
1850	182	+102.2%
1900	306	+68.1%
1950	597	+95.1%
1975	961	+61.0%
1980	1,044	+8.6%
1990	1,310	+25.5%
2000	1,377	+5.1%
2010	1,820	+32.2%
2015	1,961	+7.7%

== Government ==
Members of the town council are voted on once every four years. The town council is composed of five councilors, of which one is elected as the chairperson (Gemeindaaman.

The five town councilors for 2014-2017 are as follows:

- Werner Scherer, Gemeindeammann (SVP)
- Walter Hubmann, Vizeammann (independent)
- Patrick Bellini, (CVP)
- Jürg Lienberger, (SVP)
- Hanspeter Schmid, Gemeinderat (independent)

== Religion ==
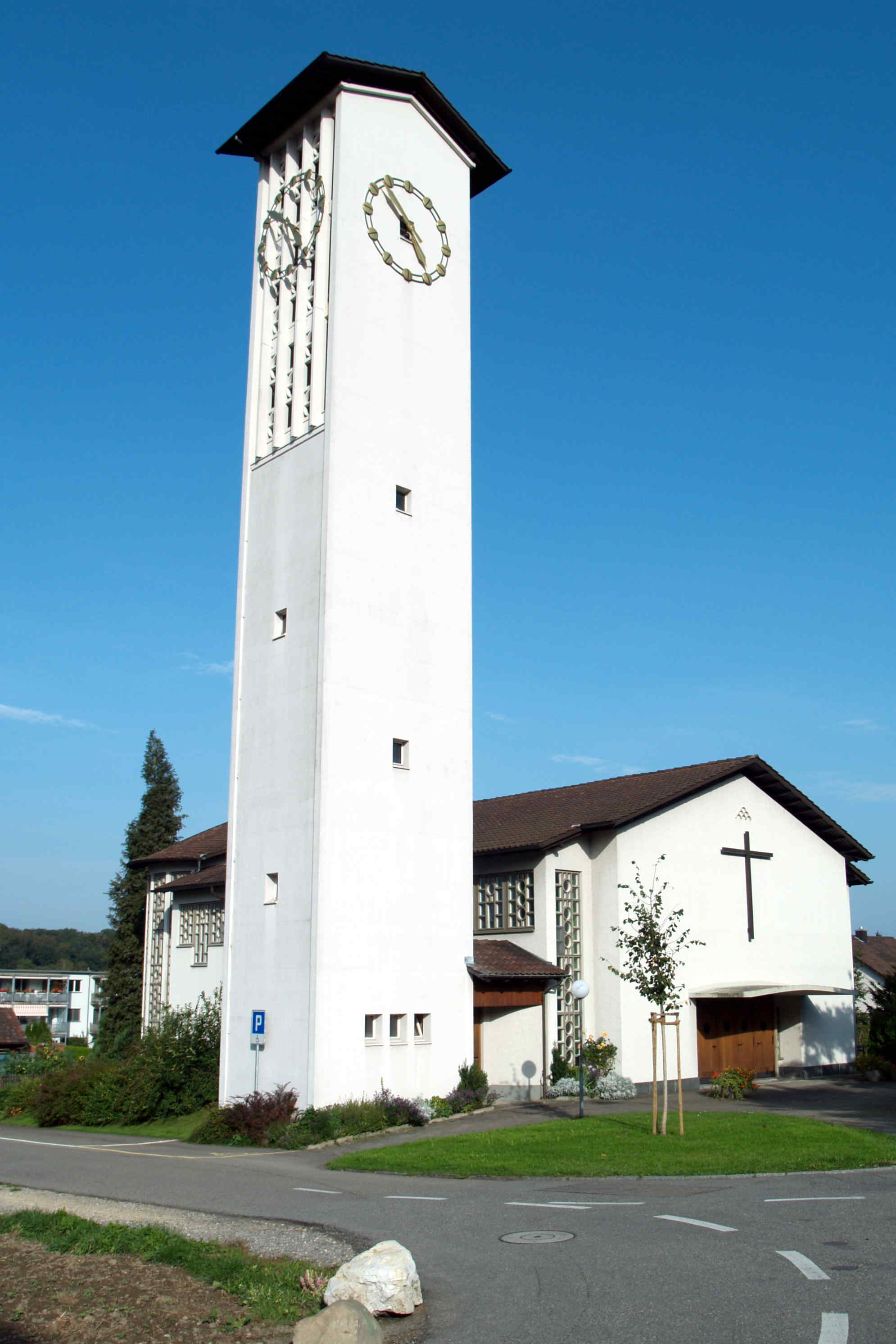
Roman Catholic Church of Killwangen

From the 2000 census, 667 or 48.4% are Roman Catholic, while 414 or 30.1% belonged to the Swiss Reformed Church. Of the rest of the population, there are 5 individuals (or about 0.36% of the population) who belong to the Christian Catholic faith.

== Economy ==
Killwangen is primarily a bedroom community, as most of the employed workforce commutes daily to Baden, Spreitenbach or to jobs in the Zurich agglomeration.

As of 2007, Killwangen had an unemployment rate of 4.57%. As of 2005, there were 11 people employed in the primary economic sector and about 6 businesses involved in this sector. 233 people are employed in the secondary sector and there are 15 businesses in this sector. 158 people are employed in the tertiary sector, with 54 businesses in this sector.

As of 2000 there were 739 total workers who lived in the municipality. Of these, 649 or about 87.8% of the residents worked outside Killwangen while 295 people commuted into the municipality for work. There were a total of 385 jobs (of at least 6 hours per week) in the municipality.

== Transportation ==
Killwangen is served by half hour S-Bahn (commuter service) from Killwangen-Spreitenbach railway station as well as by the Baden transit corporation which operates frequent bus service as. Killwangen-Spreitenbach is a stop of the S-Bahn Zürich on the lines S3 and S12.

== Education ==
Killwangen operates a newly built and consolidated kindergarten facility and a newly expanded (2016) primary school. Children from the 7th class and older travel to nearby Spreitenbach to middle school. High schools in Wettingen and Baden follow for those students with qualifying performance.

The Swiss population is well educated. In Killwangen about 84.1% of the population (between age 25–64) have completed either non-mandatory upper secondary education or additional higher education (either university or a Fachhochschule). Of the school age population (in the 2008/2009 school year), there are 119 students attending primary school in the municipality.
