= Neuenhof, Aargau =

Neuenhof
- Municipality
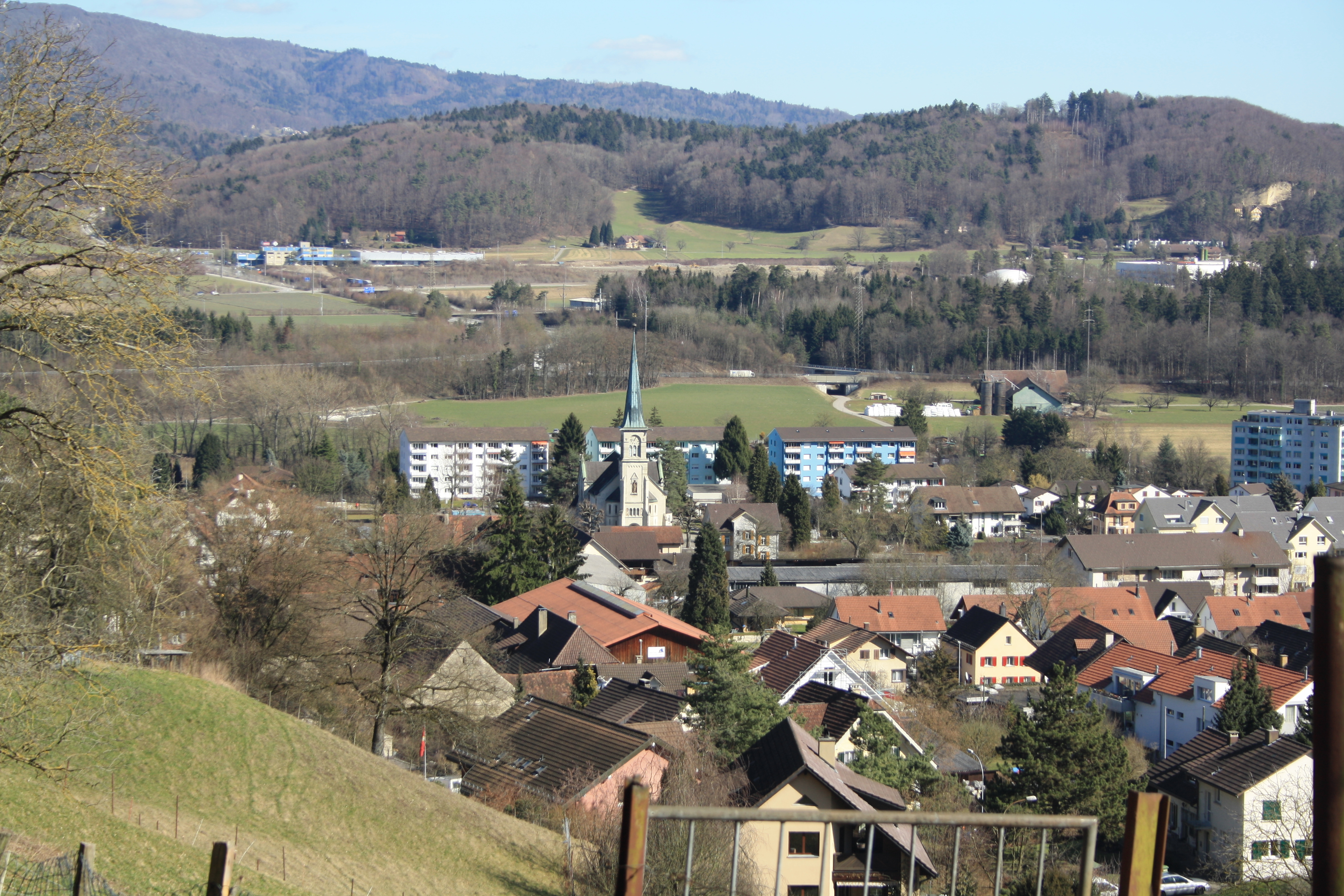

- Flag Coat of arms
- Location of Neuenhof
- Location within Switzerland Location within Canton of Aargau
- Coordinates: 47°27′N 8°19′E
- Country: Switzerland
- Canton: Aargau
- District: Baden

Area
  - Total: 5.37 km^{2} (2.07 sq mi)
- Elevation: 403 m (1,322 ft)

Population (December 2020)
  - Total: 8,954
  - Density: 1,670/km^{2} (4,320/sq mi)
- Time zone: UTC+01:00 (CET)
  - Summer (DST): UTC+02:00 (CEST)
- Postal code: 5432
- SFOS number: 4034
- ISO 3166 code: CH-AG
- Surrounded by: Baden, Fislisbach, Killwangen, Oberrohrdorf, Wettingen, Würenlos
- Twin towns: Holzgerlingen (Germany)
- Website: neuenhof.ch

Neuenhof (German pronunciation: [ˈnɔʏənhoːf]) is a municipality in the district of Baden in the canton of Aargau in Switzerland, located in the Limmat Valley (German: Limmattal).

== History ==
Neuenhof is first mentioned in 1393 as ob dem nuiwem Hof.

== Geography ==
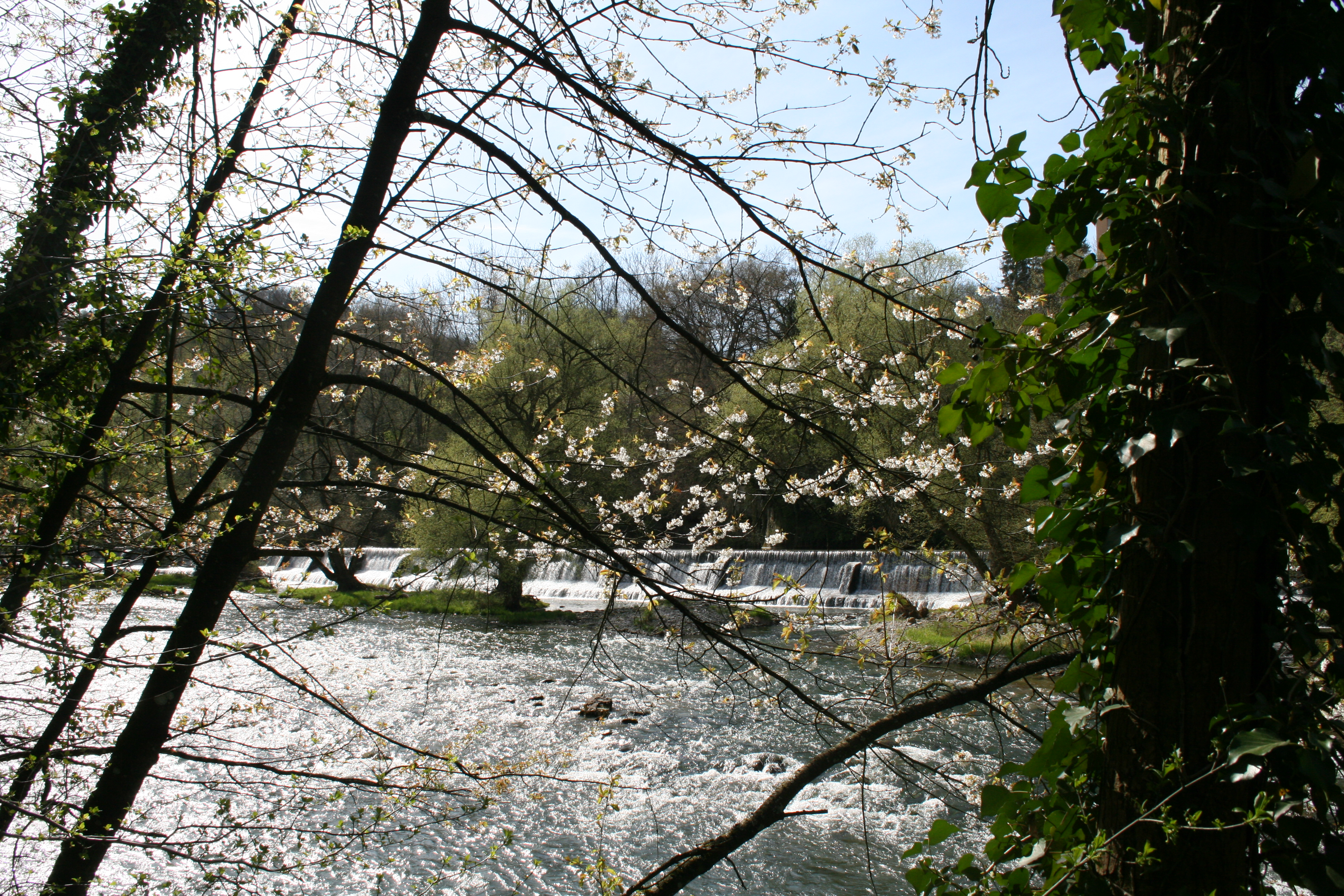
Limmat River between Wettingen Abbey and Webermühle housing development

Aerial view (1957)

Neuenhof has an area, as of 2006, of 5.4 km^{2} (2.1 sq mi). Of this area, 17.7% is used for agricultural purposes, while 51% is forested. Of the rest of the land, 26.2% is settled (buildings or roads) and the remainder (5.2%) is non-productive (rivers or lakes).

The municipality is located in the Baden district, between the Heitersberg and the Limmat river. It consists of the village of Neuenhof along the former village stream, and the farming village of Rüsler as well as a new housing development. The municipalities of Baden and Neuenhof sought a merger by 1 January 2012 into a new municipality which would be known as Baden. This was rejected by a referendum in Baden in 2010.

== Coat of arms ==
The blazon of the municipal coat of arms is Per fess Or and Gules two Mullet of Five in pale counterchanged.

== Demographics ==
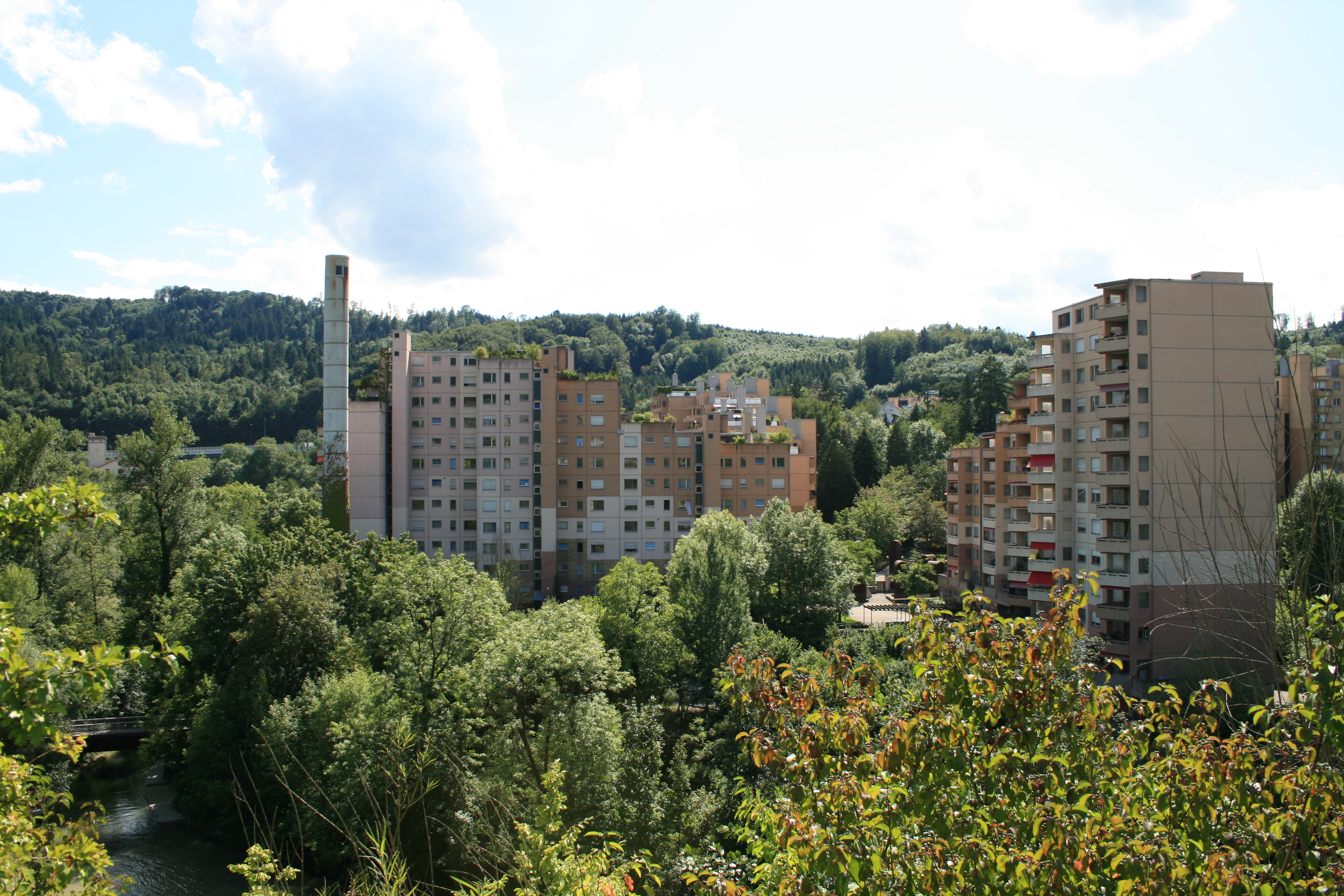
Webermühle housing development in Neuenhof

Neuenhof has a population (as of 31 December 2020) of 8,954. As of 2008, 46.5% of the population was made up of foreign nationals. Over the last 10 years the population has grown at a rate of 6.1%. Most of the population (as of 2000) speaks German (73.8%), with Italian being second most common ( 8.7%) and Serbo-Croatian being third ( 5.5%).

The age distribution, as of 2008, in Neuenhof is; 758 children or 9.5% of the population are between 0 and 9 years old and 832 teenagers or 10.4% are between 10 and 19. Of the adult population, 1,351 people or 16.9% of the population are between 20 and 29 years old. 1,270 people or 15.9% are between 30 and 39, 1,128 people or 14.1% are between 40 and 49, and 1,019 people or 12.7% are between 50 and 59. The senior population distribution is 863 people or 10.8% of the population are between 60 and 69 years old, 526 people or 6.6% are between 70 and 79, there are 209 people or 2.6% who are between 80 and 89, and there are 42 people or 0.5% who are 90 and older.

As of 2000, there were 606 homes with 1 or 2 persons in the household, 2,181 homes with 3 or 4 persons in the household, and 571 homes with 5 or more persons in the household. The average number of people per household was 2.21 individuals. In 2008 there were 417 single family homes (or 11.0% of the total) out of a total of 3,790 homes and apartments.

In the 2007 federal election the most popular party was the SVP which received 41.8% of the vote. The next three most popular parties were the SP (19.2%), the CVP (17.2%) and the FDP (7.3%).

In Neuenhof about 64.1% of the population (between age 25–64) have completed either non-mandatory upper secondary education or additional higher education (either university or a Fachhochschule). Of the school age population (in the 2008/2009 school year), there are 543 students attending primary school, there are 260 students attending secondary school in the municipality.

The historical population is given in the following table:

Historical population
Year	Pop.	±%
1780	179	—
1803	200	+11.7%
1850	394	+97.0%
1900	872	+121.3%
1950	1,986	+127.8%
2000	7,613	+283.3%

== Economy ==
As of 2007, Neuenhof had an unemployment rate of 3.65%. As of 2005, there were 9 people employed in the primary economic sector and about 5 businesses involved in this sector. 513 people are employed in the secondary sector and there are 64 businesses in this sector. 1,194 people are employed in the tertiary sector, with 181 businesses in this sector.

As of 2000 there was a total of 4,291 workers who lived in the municipality. Of these, 3,711 or about 86.5% of the residents worked outside Neuenhof while 1,137 people commuted into the municipality for work. There were a total of 1,717 jobs (of at least 6 hours per week) in the municipality.

== Religion ==
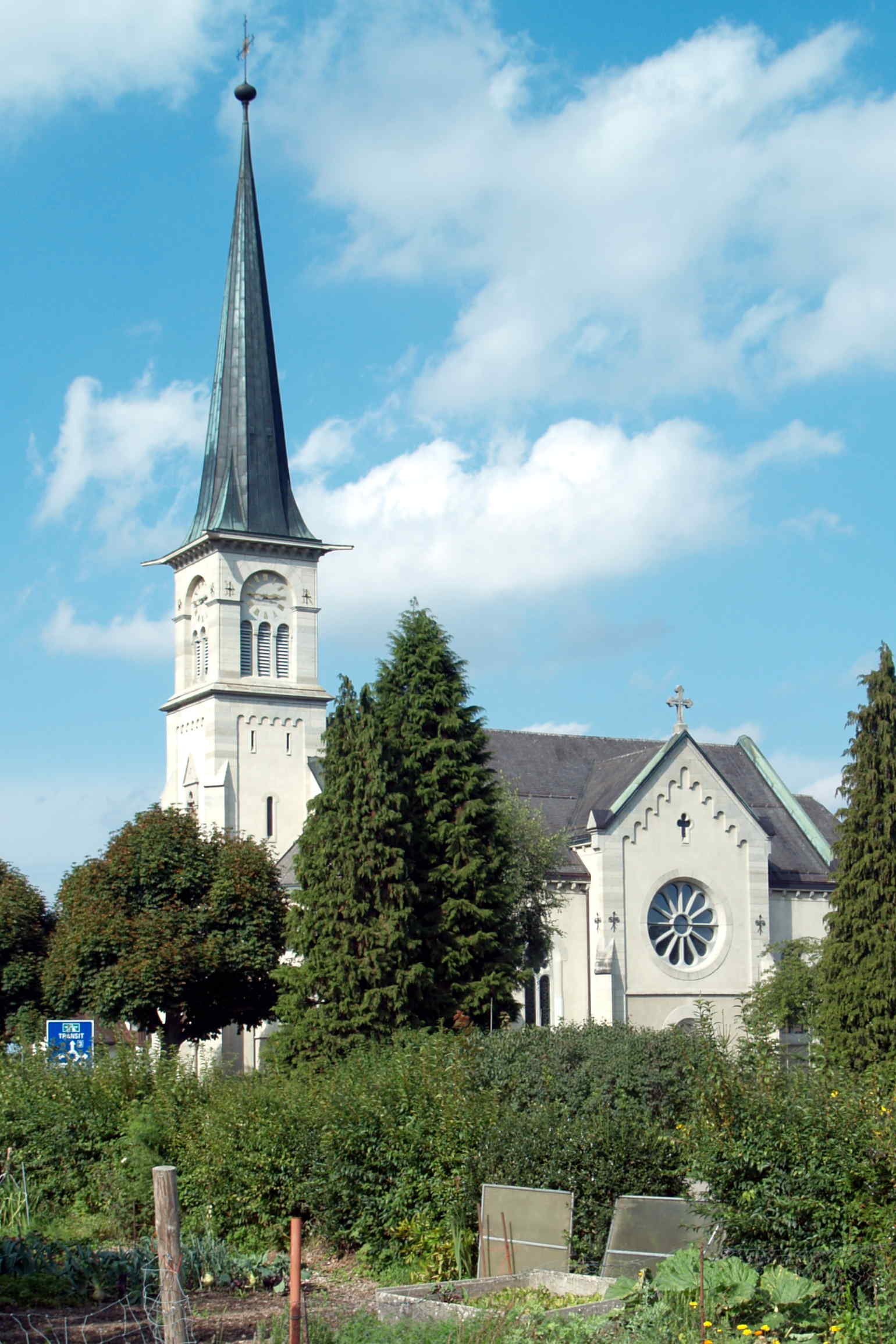
Roman Catholic Church of Neuenhof

From the 2000 census, 3,638 or 47.8% are Roman Catholic, while 1,659 or 21.8% belonged to the Swiss Reformed Church. Of the rest of the population, there are 16 individuals (or about 0.21% of the population) who belong to the Christian Catholic faith.

== Transportation ==
The municipality is located on the A1/A3 motorway.

Neuenhof railway station is a stop of the S-Bahn Zürich on the line S12.

Schräglift Webermühle links Webermühle to Wettingen railway station.

== Notable people from Neuenhof ==
- (Croatia) (Switzerland) Mladen Petrić – Footballer for Fulham F.C. Petrić moved to the village as a child.
