= Damian Müller =

Swiss politician (born 1984)

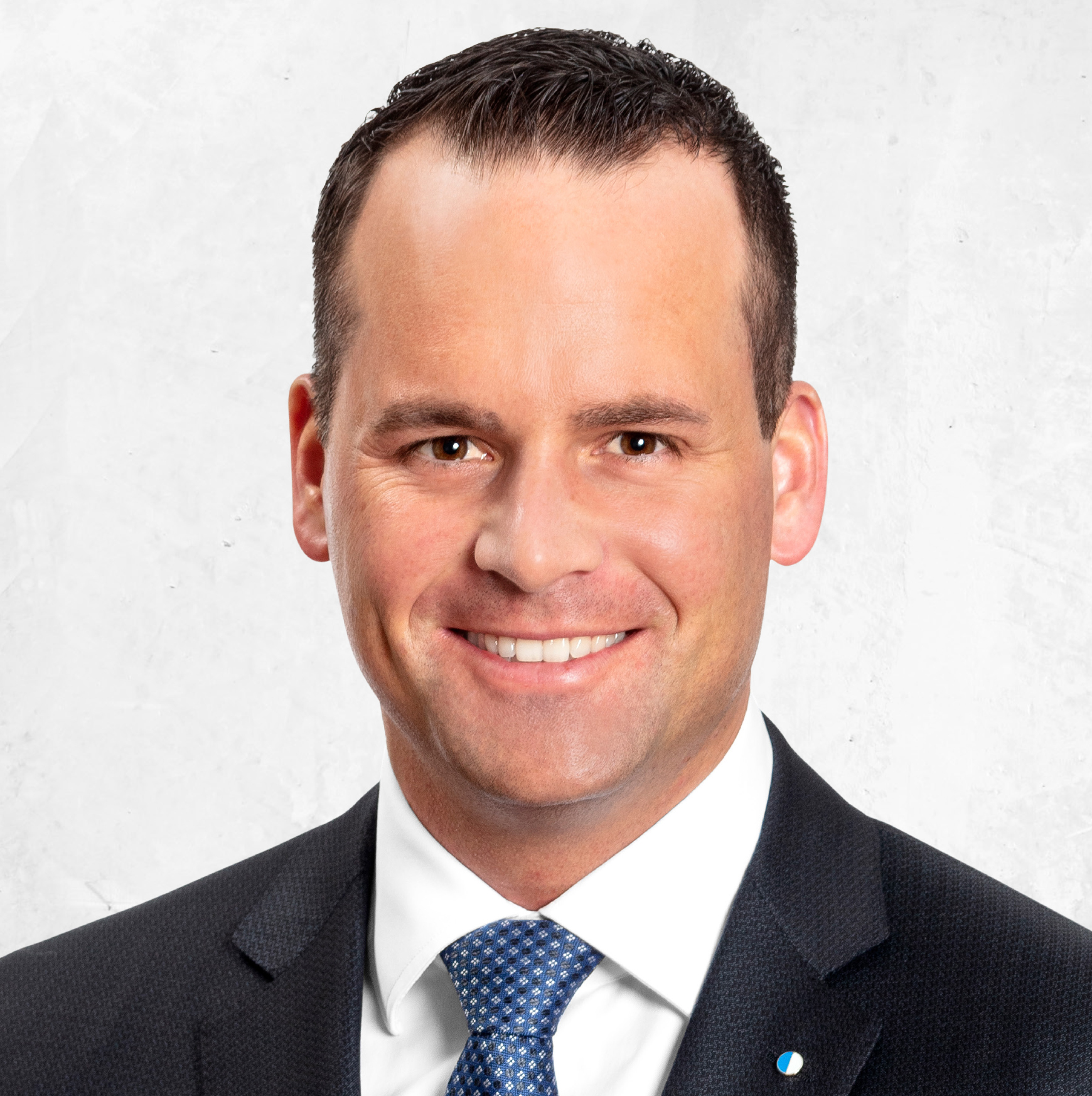
- Damian Müller (2019)

Member of the Council of States (Switzerland)
- Incumbent
- Assumed office 30 November 2015
- Constituency: Canton of Lucerne

Personal details
- Born: Damian Müller; 25 October 1984 (age 41) Ermensee, Lucerne, Switzerland
- Party: The Liberals

Damian Müller (/mullər/; mueller; born 25 October 1984) is a Swiss businessman, consultant and politician. He currently serves as a member of the Council of States (Switzerland) for The Liberals since 2015. In 2023, he is seeking his third term, in the position. He previously served on the Cantonal Council of Lucerne from 2011 to 2015.

== Early life and education ==
Müller was born and raised in Ermensee where he also attended local schools. His parents, Ernst and Gaby Müller, operated Elektro Müller AG in Hitzkirch, an electrician company. He completed a commercial apprenticeship. Since his early youth he engaged in equestrian sports and currently is often active as speaker at horse related events in entire Switzerland. He completed a certificate in Public Relations (eidgenössischer Fachausweis). He is fluent in English and French.

== Career ==
After completing his apprenticeship, Müller worked as a Sales Manager in the Scandinavia and Eastern Europe division, of a trading company. Until 2016, he was an executive for key clients and external sales for Valora in Neuenhof. He is currently employed part-time besides his activities in the Swiss legislature as a senior public affairs consultant at Mobiliar, a Swiss insurance concern.

Since 2022, Müller is the owner and managing consultant of Mü.Pa.Beratung GmbH, a public relations firm specialized in communications for associations, companies, authorities and individuals, for political questions and analysis.

== Politics ==
From 2001 to 2016 Damian Müller was on the board of the FDP Hitzkirch. In 2008, at the age of 24, he was elected president of the merging local FDP parties in Hitzkirch, Sulz, Hämikon, Müswangen, Retschwil, Gelfingen and Mosen. In 2011, Müller ran for Cantonal Council of Lucerne and was elected with the third-best result. Between 2012 and 2020 he took a seat on the executive board of The Liberals in Canton of Luzern.

Since 30 November 2015 he serves as a member of the Council of States (Switzerland). He was the youngest member to be elected in the position.
