= Schwarzenbach, Lucerne =

Former municipality, canton of Lucerne

Schwarzenbach
- Former municipality
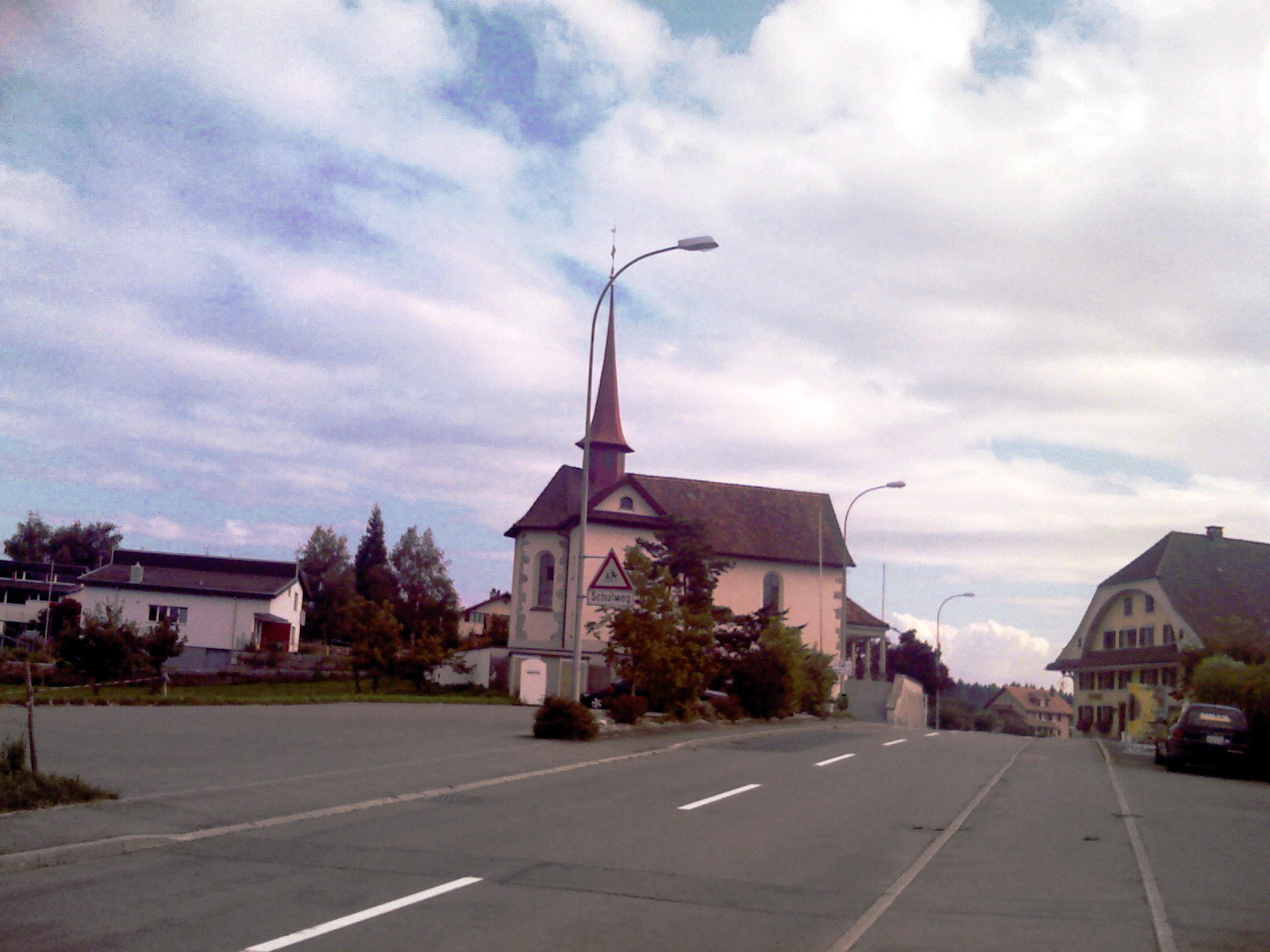

- Coat of arms
- Location of Schwarzenbach
- Location within Switzerland Location within Canton of Lucerne
- Coordinates: 47.2319°N 8.2115°E
- Country: Switzerland
- Canton: Lucerne
- District: Sursee
- Municipality: Beromünster

Population (2000)
  - Total: 233
- Time zone: UTC+01:00 (CET)
  - Summer (DST): UTC+02:00 (CEST)
- SFOS number: 1101
- ISO 3166 code: CH-LU
- Website: Profile (in German),

Schwarzenbach is a former municipality in the Sursee district of the canton of Lucerne, Switzerland. Since 2004 it has been part of the municipality of Beromünster. It lies on the high ground between the Seetal and the Wynental, north of the Erlosen.

== History ==
Schwarzenbach is first mentioned in 1173 as Swarzenbah. Roman graves and settlement remains have been found there. The church of St. Peter was probably founded by the barons (Freiherren) of Krenkingen. A parish priest (Leutpriester) is first mentioned in 1215. In the 13th century Burkhard von Winon, a canon of Beromünster, acquired the rights in the village, and before 1268 he incorporated the church into the chaplaincy of St. Maurice in Münster. Before 1321 Johann von Winon sold the village, with the advocacy (Vogtei) and the low jurisdiction, to the chapter of Beromünster. From then on Schwarzenbach shared the fortunes of the Michelsamt and of the court district of Münster. In 1808–1811 the parish was separated from the chapter's benefice and became independent. Until 1807 the Grüt farm, an endowment of the Krenkingens, belonged to the parish of Aesch.

After the forests were divided in 1805, the municipal boundaries with Mosen and Gunzwil were fixed between 1822 and 1854. Besides arable and livestock farming, the growing of fruit for cider and pig breeding were important. In 2001 agriculture still employed 86% of the people working in Schwarzenbach.

Schwarzenbach had about 30 inhabitants in 1456, about 96 around 1695, 137 in 1798, 189 in 1850, 183 in 1900, 171 in 1950 and 233 in 2000.

== Bibliography ==
- Die Kunstdenkmäler des Kantons Luzern, vol. 4, 1956, pp. 364–366
- M. Wandeler, Luzern Stadt und Land in römischer Zeit, 1968, pp. 75 f.
- F. Glauser, J. J. Siegrist, Die Luzerner Pfarreien und Landvogteien, 1977, pp. 124, 174
