= Altwis =

- Former municipality
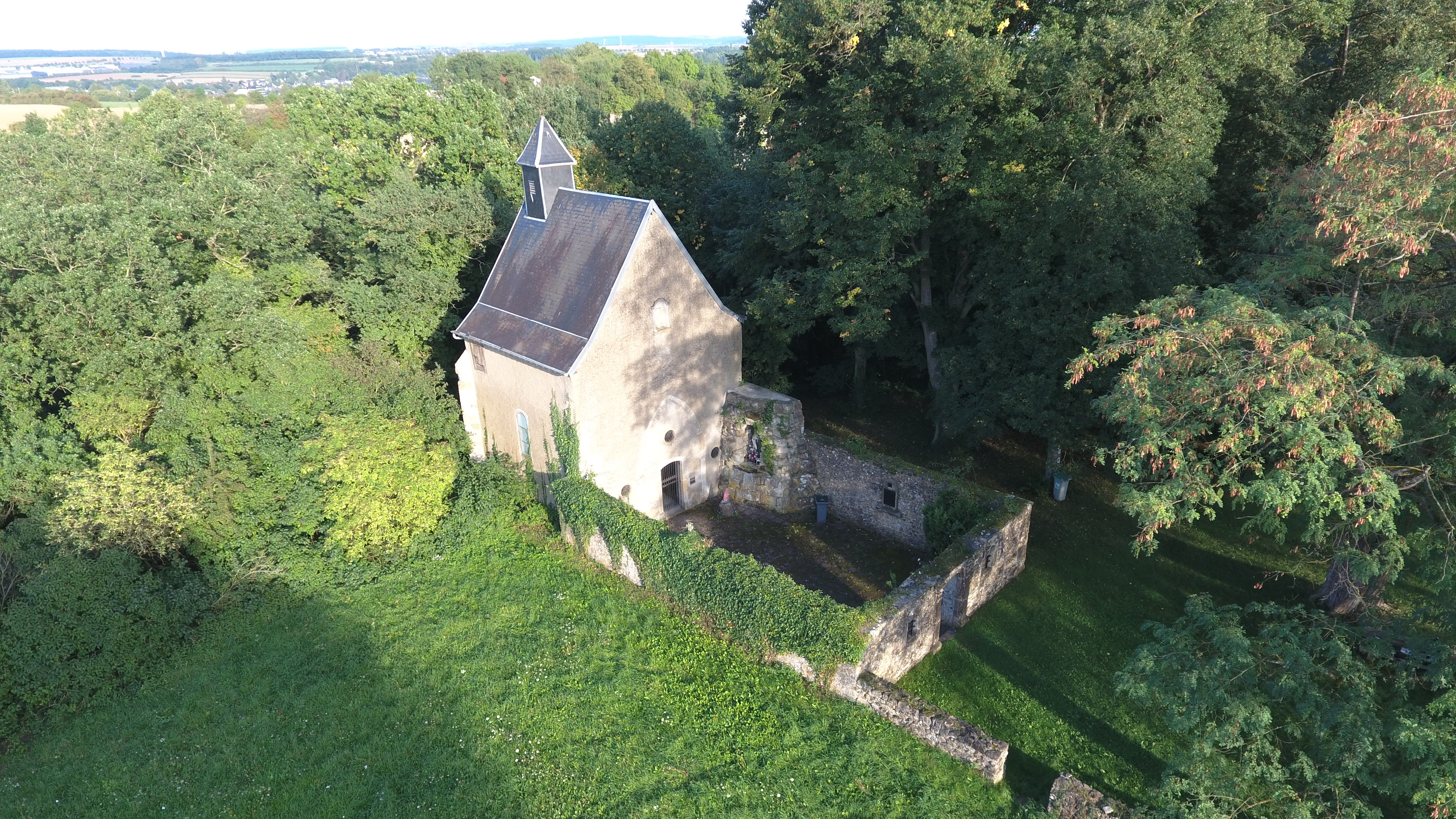

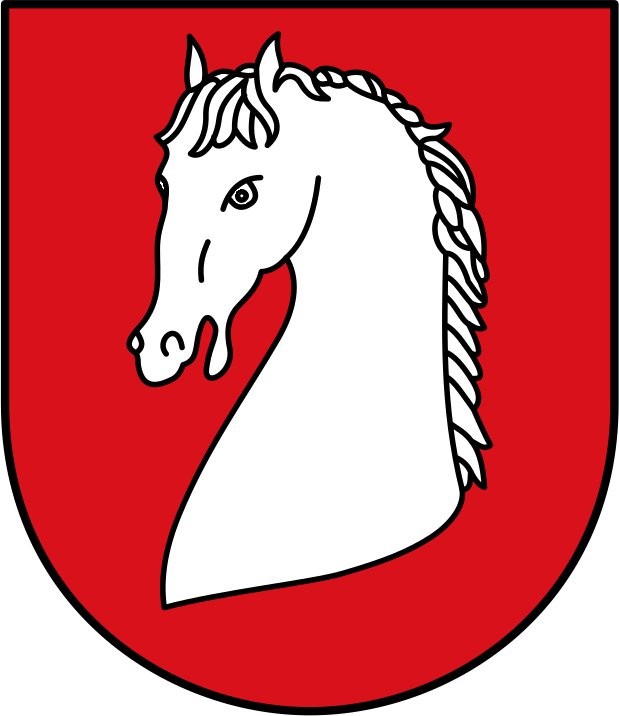
- Coat of arms
- Location of Altwis
- Location within Switzerland Location within Canton of Lucerne
- Coordinates: 47°14′N 8°15′E
- Country: Switzerland
- Canton: Lucerne
- District: Hochdorf

Area
  - Total: 2.90 km^{2} (1.12 sq mi)
- Elevation: 484 m (1,588 ft)

Population (December 2019)
  - Total: 430
  - Density: 150/km^{2} (380/sq mi)
- Time zone: UTC+01:00 (CET)
  - Summer (DST): UTC+02:00 (CEST)
- Postal code: 6286
- SFOS number: 1022
- ISO 3166 code: CH-LU
- Surrounded by: Aesch, Ermensee, Hämikon, Hitzkirch, Mosen
- Website: www.altwis.ch

Altwis is a former municipality in the district of Hochdorf in the canton of Lucerne in Switzerland. On 1 January 2021 the former municipality of Altwis merged into the municipality of Hitzkirch.

== History ==
Altwis is first mentioned in 1113 as Altwise.

== Geography ==
Aerial view (1953)

Altwis is located in the Seetal valley, at the western foot of the Lindenberg mountain, between Lake Hallwil and Lake Baldegg.

The former municipality consists of the village of Altwis. It had an area of 2.9 km^{2} (1.1 sq mi). Of this area, 63.8% is used for agricultural purposes, while 29% is forested. The rest of the land, (7.2%) is settled. In the 1997 land survey, 28.97% of the total land area was forested. Of the agricultural land, 48.97% is used for farming or pastures, while 14.83% is used for orchards or vine crops. Of the settled areas, 4.14% is covered with buildings, 0.69% is industrial, 0.34% is classed as special developments, and 2.07% is transportation infrastructure.

== Demographics ==
Altwis had a population (as of 2019) of 430. As of 2007, 10.5% of the population was made up of foreign nationals. Over the last 10 years the population has grown at a rate of 6%. Most of the population (as of 2000) speaks German (89.8%), with Albanian being second most common ( 8.2%) and Spanish being third ( 0.6%).

In the 2007 election the most popular party was the CVP which received 29.3% of the vote. The next three most popular parties were the FDP (28.9%), the SVP (28.7%) and the Green Party (7%).

The age distribution in Altwis is; 101 people or 27.3% of the population is 0–19 years old. 104 people or 28.1% are 20–39 years old, and 135 people or 36.5% are 40–64 years old. The senior population distribution is 18 people or 4.9% are 65–79 years old, 8 or 2.2% are 80–89 years old and 4 people or 1.1% of the population are 90+ years old.

In Altwis about 73.3% of the population (between age 25-64) have completed either non-mandatory upper secondary education or additional higher education (either university or a Fachhochschule).

As of 2000 there are 132 households, of which 41 households (or about 31.1%) contain only a single individual. 22 or about 16.7% are large households, with at least five members. As of 2000 there were 93 inhabited buildings in the municipality, of which 61 were built only as housing, and 32 were mixed use buildings. There were 51 single family homes, 8 double family homes, and 2 multi-family homes in the municipality. Most homes were either two (41) or three (14) story structures. There were only 4 single story buildings and 2 four or more story buildings.

Altwis has an unemployment rate of 0.79%. As of 2005, there were 56 people employed in the primary economic sector and about 18 businesses involved in this sector. 11 people are employed in the secondary sector and there are 4 businesses in this sector. 72 people are employed in the tertiary sector, with 12 businesses in this sector. As of 2000 58.5% of the population of the municipality were employed in some capacity. At the same time, females made up 40.6% of the workforce.

In the 2000 census the religious membership of Altwis was; 266 (75.1%) were Roman Catholic, and 23 (6.5%) were Protestant, with an additional 1 (0.28%) who was of some other Christian faith. There are 33 individuals (9.32% of the population) who are Muslim. Of the rest; there were 16 (4.52%) who do not belong to any organized religion, 15 (4.24%) who did not answer the question.

The historical population is given in the following table:

year	population
1680	214
1798	330
1850	372
1870	422
1900	349
1920	297
1950	350
1970	295
2000	354
