= Fahrwangen =

- Municipality
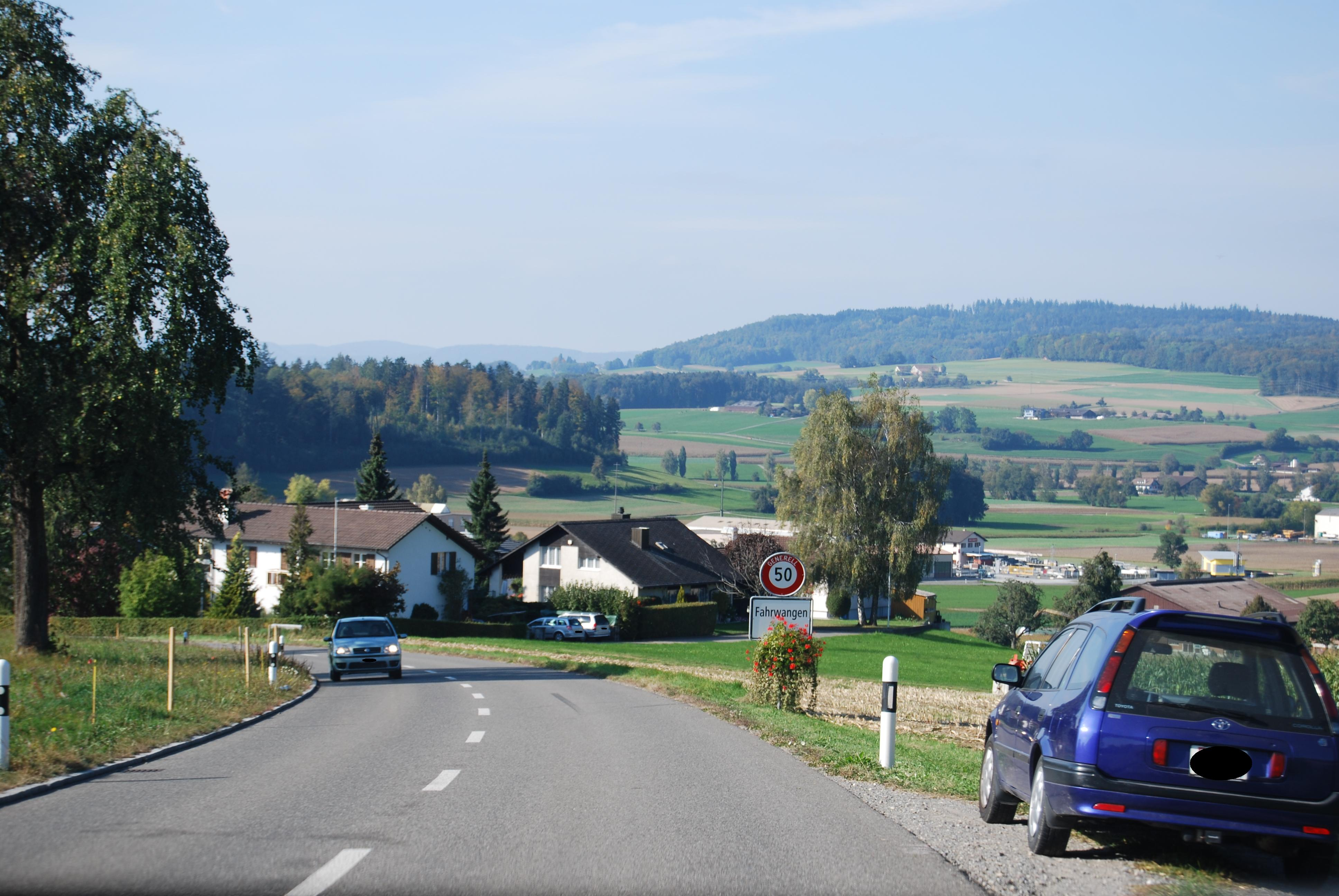

- Flag Coat of arms
- Location of Fahrwangen
- Location within Switzerland Location within Canton of Aargau
- Coordinates: 47°18′N 8°14′E
- Country: Switzerland
- Canton: Aargau
- District: Lenzburg

Government
  - Mayor: Marlène Campiche

Area
  - Total: 3.99 km^{2} (1.54 sq mi)
- Elevation: 543 m (1,781 ft)

Population (2006)
  - Total: 1,724
  - Density: 432/km^{2} (1,120/sq mi)
- Time zone: UTC+01:00 (CET)
  - Summer (DST): UTC+02:00 (CEST)
- Postal code: 5615
- SFOS number: 4196
- ISO 3166 code: CH-AG
- Surrounded by: Aesch (LU), Beinwil am See, Bettwil, Meisterschwanden, Sarmenstorf, Schongau (LU)
- Website: www.fahrwangen.ch

Fahrwangen is a municipality in the district of Lenzburg in the canton of Aargau in Switzerland.

== History ==
Aerial view (1954)

Prehistorical finds from various Neolithic eras, Roman and Alamanni ruins all testify to a long history of human habitation around Fahrwangen. The modern municipality of Fahrwangen is first mentioned in 924 as Farnowanch. Under the Habsburgs both the high and low justice were brought together with the County of Tennwil. Between 1354 and 1380 the Lords of Hallwyl acquired all rights to the municipality. Under the Hallwyls and later under Bern, Fahrwangen was a special, independent high court.

During the second Villmergen war in 1712, Fahrwangen was used as a camp by the Reformed troops. As the Catholic troops attacked, according to legend, the women of Fahrwangen and Meisterschwanden marched out to join the soldiers. The Protestant Bernese troops were so impressed with the valor of the women, that they granted them a day when the women could command. Since then, on the second Sunday in January they have celebrated the Meitlisunntig (Girls' Sunday). On this day, women from both villages run through the streets carrying nets. Any man who is captured in a net must pay his Lösegelds or ransom (often in the form of alcoholic drinks) to get free.

Since 1920 it has had a district school.

Religiously, it was originally part of the parish of Sarmenstorf, and between 1531 and 1817 it was in the parish of Seengen. After 1817 it became its own Reformed parish, which included Meisterschwanden.

Economically, until the 18th century, it was a farming village. Agriculture was partly replaced in the 18th century by cotton weaving, and in the 19th century by straw plaiting both at home and in factories. In the 20th century other industries moved into the village. Continuously, since the early 20th century, a high proportion of the population is employed in industry (1920–70 over 60%, 2000 58%). Since 1980 more workers commute out of Fahrwangen than commute in for jobs.

== Geography ==
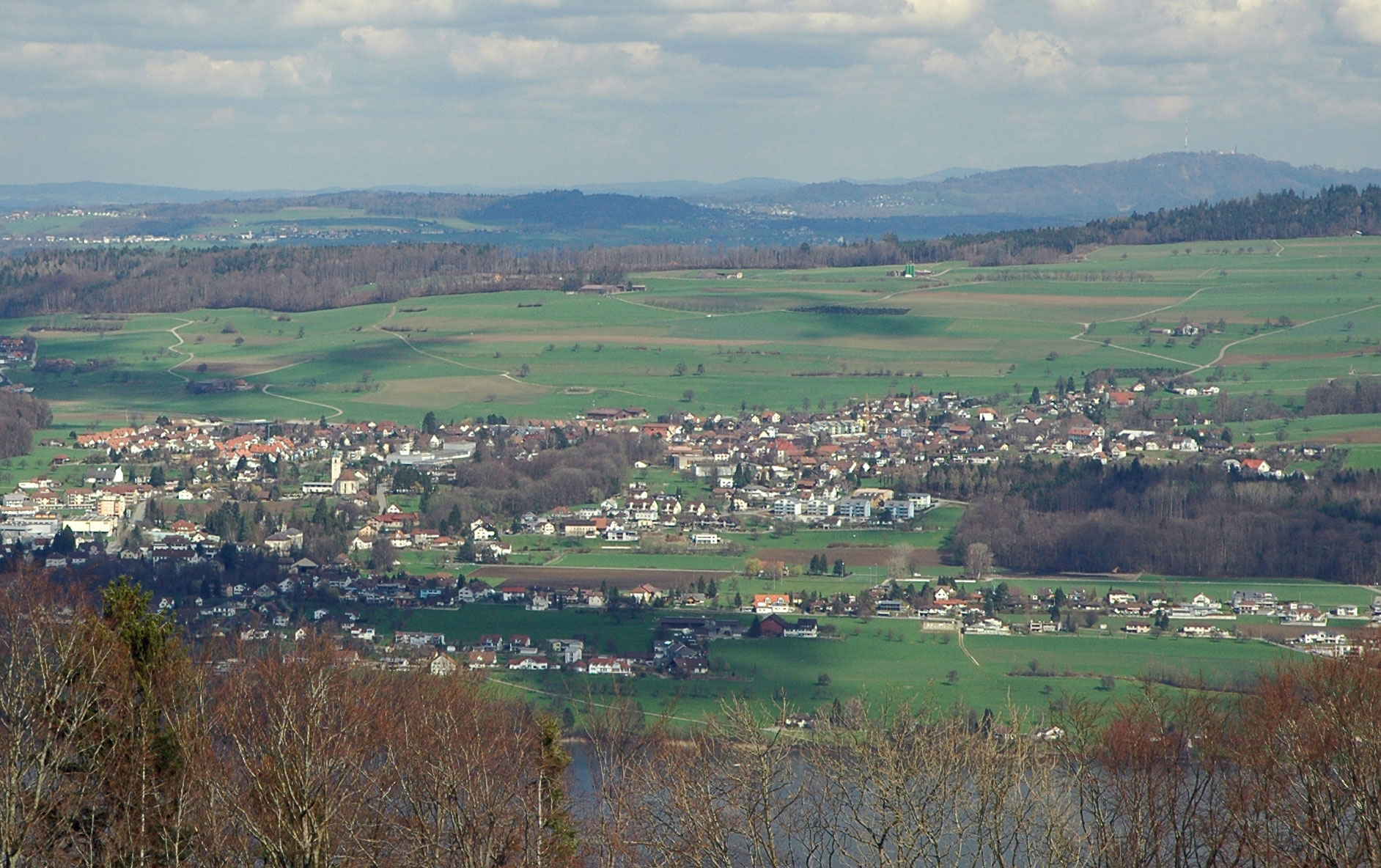
Fahrwagen, seen from the Homberg

Fahrwangen lies on the southern edge of the district of Lenzburg, in the Seetal valley east of the Hallwilersee. It borders the canton of Luzern. It is located at the western foot of the Lindenberg mountain in a depression above the Hallwilersee. It consists of the irregular, unplanned, and quite closely packed village of Fahrwangen, built around a central square.

Fahrwangen has an area, as of 2009, of 3.99 square kilometers (1.54 sq mi). Of this area, 2.26 km^{2} (0.87 sq mi) or 56.6% is used for agricultural purposes, while 0.99 km^{2} (0.38 sq mi) or 24.8% is forested. Of the rest of the land, 0.69 km^{2} (0.27 sq mi) or 17.3% is settled (buildings or roads), 0.01 km^{2} (2.5 acres) or 0.3% is either rivers or lakes and 0.01 km^{2} (2.5 acres) or 0.3% is unproductive land.

Of the built up area, housing and buildings made up 11.0% and transportation infrastructure made up 5.0%. Out of the forested land, all of the forested land area is covered with heavy forests. Of the agricultural land, 42.4% is used for growing crops and 12.8% is pastures, while 1.5% is used for orchards or vine crops. All the water in the municipality is in rivers and streams.

== Coat of arms ==
The blazon of the municipal coat of arms is Per fess Or a lion passant Gules and of the last.

== Demographics ==
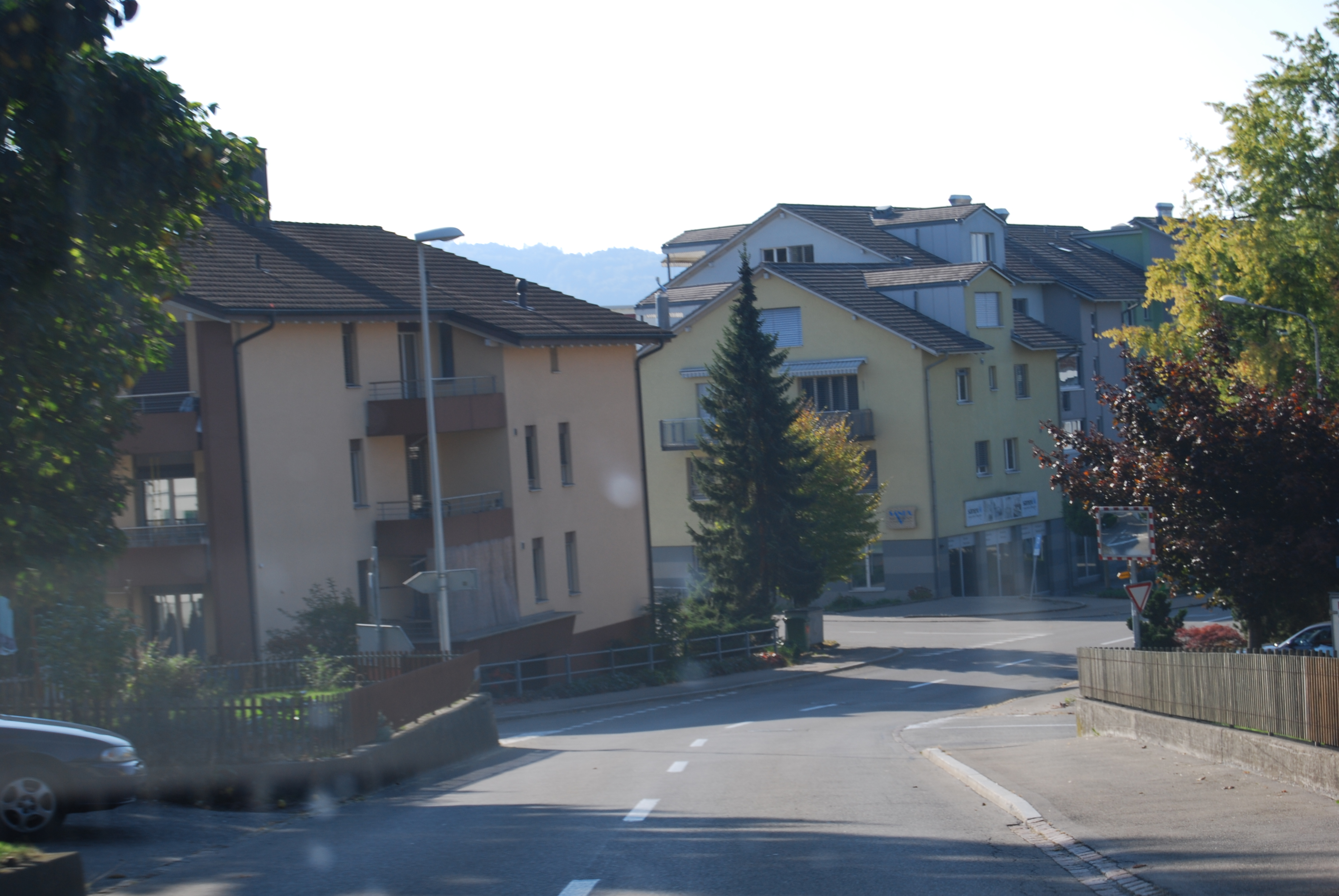
Houses in Fahrwangen

Fahrwangen has a population (as of December 2020) of 2,338. As of June 2009, 20.1% of the population are foreign nationals. Over the last 10 years (1997–2007) the population has changed at a rate of 6.9%. Most of the population (as of 2000) speaks German (89.2%), with Italian being second most common ( 3.0%) and Turkish being third ( 2.0%).

The age distribution, as of 2008, in Fahrwangen is; 173 children or 9.5% of the population are between 0 and 9 years old and 253 teenagers or 13.8% are between 10 and 19. Of the adult population, 251 people or 13.7% of the population are between 20 and 29 years old. 200 people or 10.9% are between 30 and 39, 330 people or 18.0% are between 40 and 49, and 249 people or 13.6% are between 50 and 59. The senior population distribution is 174 people or 9.5% of the population are between 60 and 69 years old, 120 people or 6.6% are between 70 and 79, there are 68 people or 3.7% who are between 80 and 89, and there are 12 people or 0.7% who are 90 and older.

As of 2000 the average number of residents per living room was 0.58 which is about equal to the cantonal average of 0.57 per room. In this case, a room is defined as space of a housing unit of at least 4 m^{2} (43 sq ft) as normal bedrooms, dining rooms, living rooms, kitchens and habitable cellars and attics. About 55.5% of the total households were owner occupied, or in other words did not pay rent (though they may have a mortgage or a rent-to-own agreement).

As of 2000, there were 66 homes with 1 or 2 persons in the household, 320 homes with 3 or 4 persons in the household, and 252 homes with 5 or more persons in the household. As of 2000, there were 657 private households (homes and apartments) in the municipality, and an average of 2.5 persons per household. In 2008 there were 356 single family homes (or 45.9% of the total) out of a total of 775 homes and apartments. There were a total of 14 empty apartments for a 1.8% vacancy rate. As of 2007, the construction rate of new housing units was 2.2 new units per 1000 residents.

In the 2007 federal election the most popular party was the SVP which received 41.8% of the vote. The next three most popular parties were the SP (15.7%), the FDP (12.1%) and the CVP (9.1%).

The historical population is given in the following table:

Historical population
Year	Pop.	±%
1693	260	—
1798	529	+103.5%
1850	782	+47.8%
1900	1,019	+30.3%
1950	1,052	+3.2%
1980	1,210	+15.0%
2000	1,653	+36.6%

== Economy ==
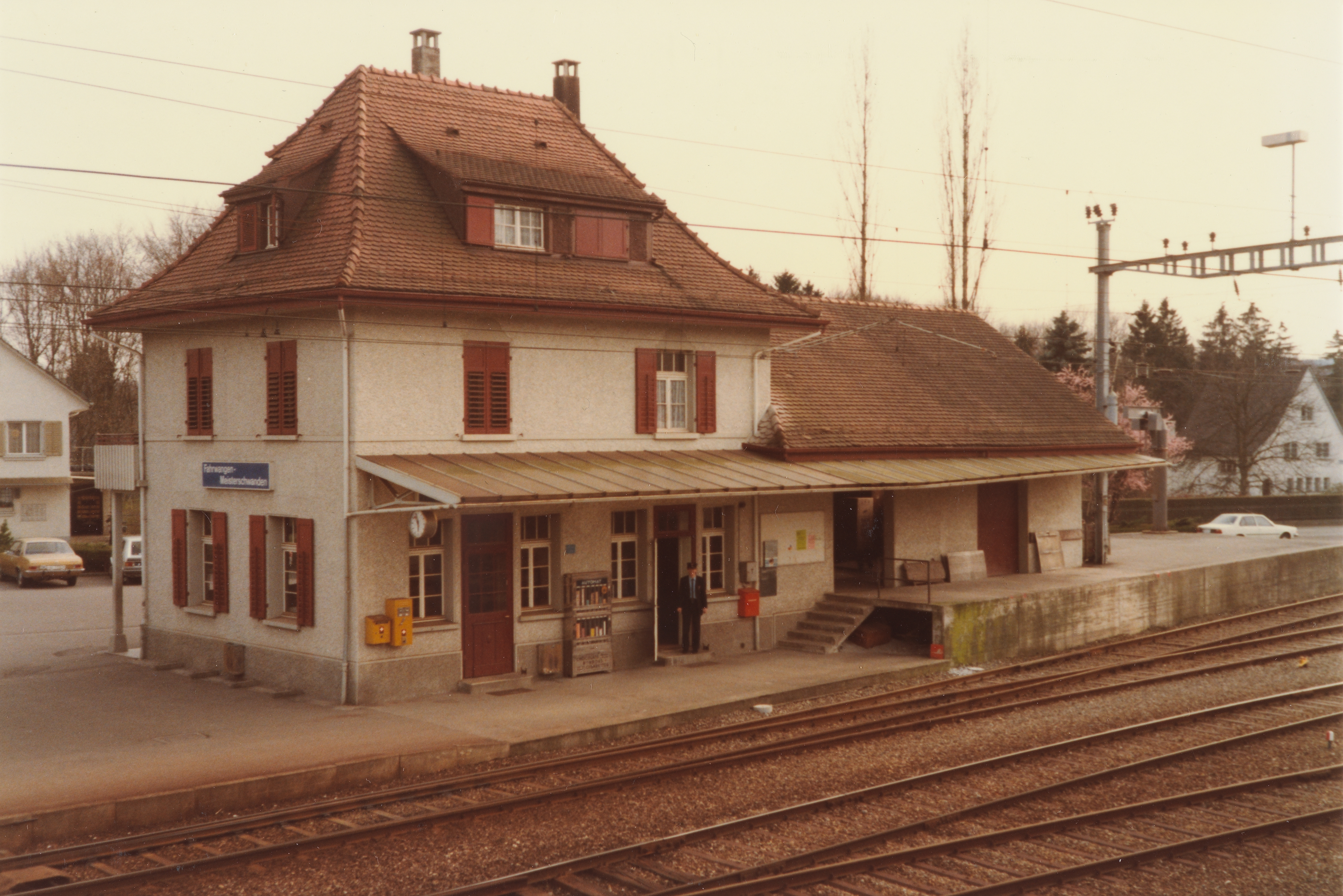
Fahrwangen-Meisterschwanden railway station in 1983 (closed in 1997)

As of 2007, Fahrwangen had an unemployment rate of 2.33%. As of 2005, there were 59 people employed in the primary economic sector and about 19 businesses involved in this sector. 348 people are employed in the secondary sector and there are 24 businesses in this sector. 232 people are employed in the tertiary sector, with 66 businesses in this sector.

In 2000 there were 845 workers who lived in the municipality. Of these, 602 or about 71.2% of the residents worked outside Fahrwangen while 366 people commuted into the municipality for work. There were a total of 609 jobs (of at least 6 hours per week) in the municipality. Of the working population, 8.4% used public transportation to get to work, and 53.9% used a private car.

== Religion ==
From the 2000 census, 663 or 40.1% were Roman Catholic, while 614 or 37.1% belonged to the Swiss Reformed Church. Of the rest of the population, there was 1 individual who belonged to the Christian Catholic faith.

== Education ==
The entire Swiss population is generally well educated. In Fahrwangen about 70.6% of the population (between age 25–64) have completed either non-mandatory upper secondary education or additional higher education (either university or a Fachhochschule). Of the school age population (in the 2008/2009 school year), there are 132 students attending primary school, there are 153 students attending tertiary or university level schooling in the municipality. Fahrwangen is home to the Gemeindebibliotheken und Schulbibliotheken library. The library has (as of 2008) 7,185 books or other media, and loaned out 22,650 items in the same year. The library was open a total of 280 days with average of 7 hours per week during that year.
