= Gelfingen =

- Former municipality
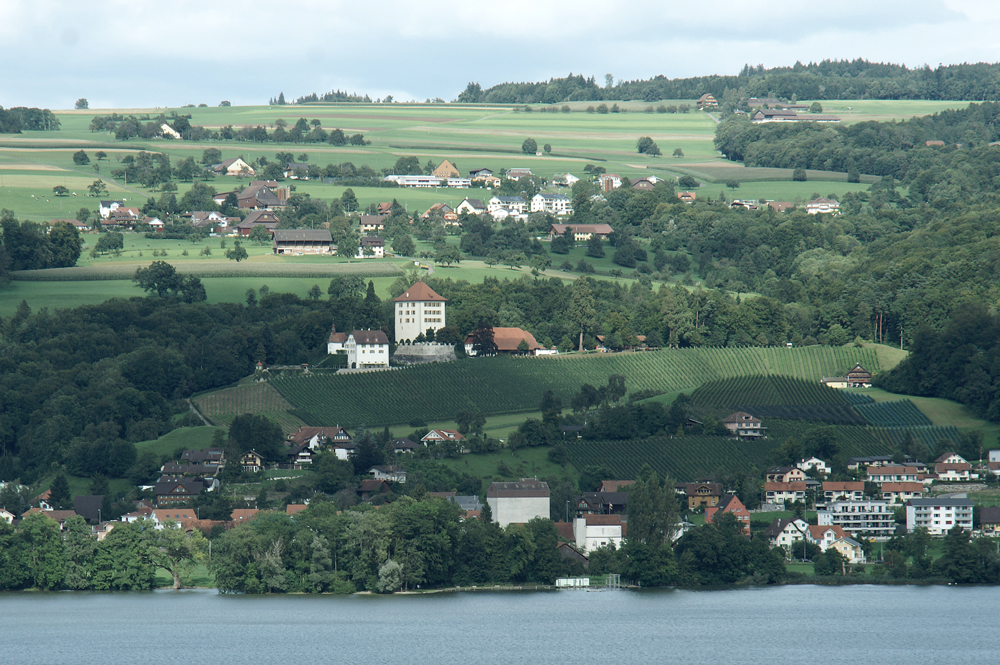

- Coat of arms
- Location of Gelfingen
- Location within Switzerland Location within Canton of Lucerne
- Coordinates: 47°13′N 8°16′E
- Country: Switzerland
- Canton: Lucerne
- District: Hochdorf

Area
  - Total: 3.86 km^{2} (1.49 sq mi)
- Elevation: 472 m (1,549 ft)

Population (December 2007)
  - Total: 764
  - Density: 198/km^{2} (513/sq mi)
- Time zone: UTC+01:00 (CET)
  - Summer (DST): UTC+02:00 (CEST)
- Postal code: 6284
- SFOS number: 1027
- ISO 3166 code: CH-LU
- Surrounded by: Hitzkirch, Hohenrain, Lieli, Retschwil, Römerswil, Sulz
- Website: www.gelfingen.ch

Gelfingen is a former municipality in the district of Hochdorf in the canton of Lucerne in Switzerland. On 1 January 2009 it became part of the municipality of Hitzkirch.

== History ==
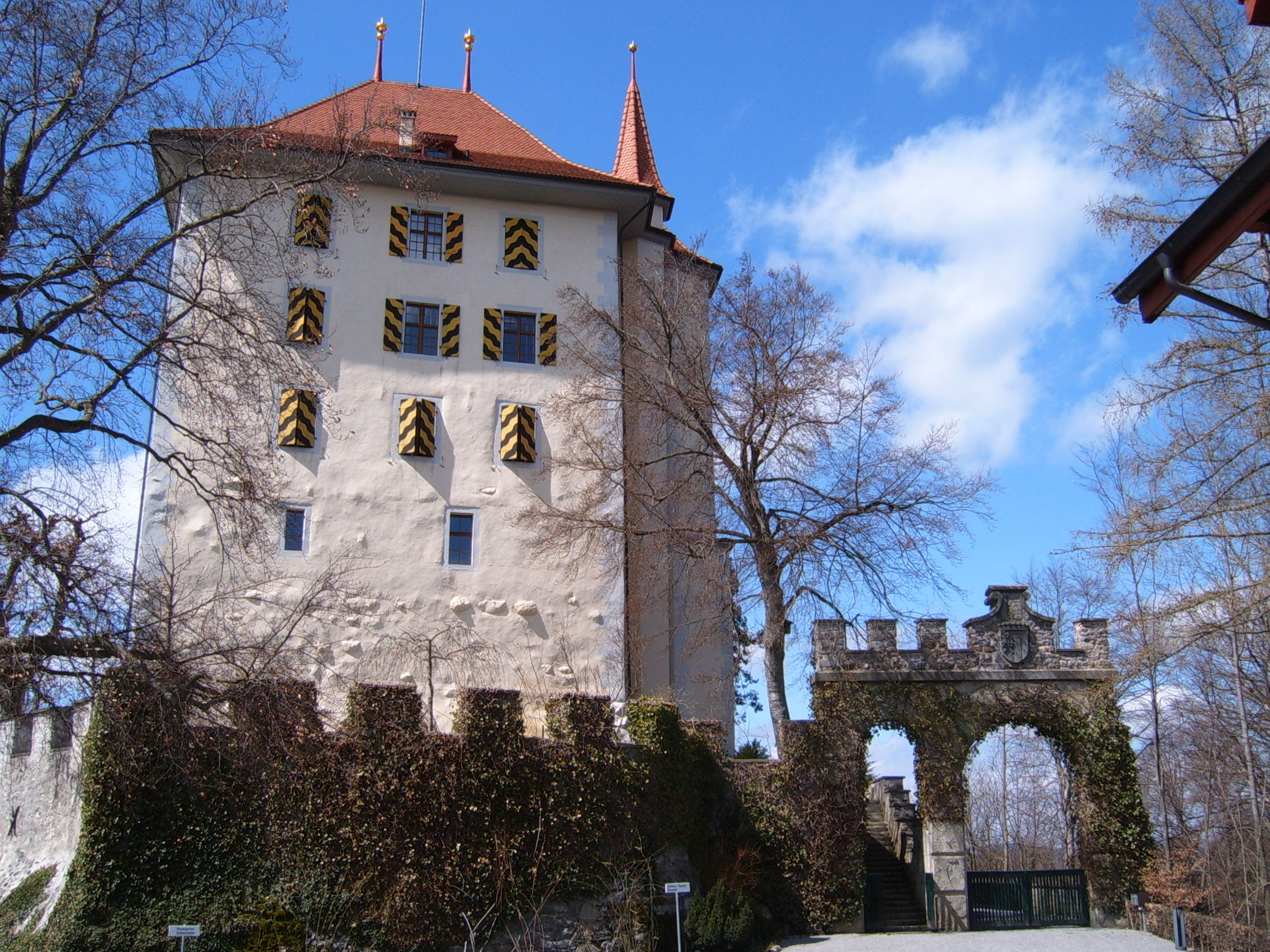
Schloss Heidegg above Gelfingen

Gelfingen is first mentioned in 1045 as Gelvingun.

== Geography ==
Gelfingen has an area of 3.9 km^{2} (1.5 sq mi). Of this area, 64.9% is used for agricultural purposes, while 25.2% is forested. Of the rest of the land, 9.6% is settled (buildings or roads) and the remainder (0.3%) is non-productive (rivers, glaciers or mountains).

The municipality is located below Schloss Heidegg on Lake Baldegg. On 21 May 2006 an attempt to merge the Hitzkirch and the surrounding 10 municipalities failed, when five of the eleven voted against the merger. A less ambitious merger was then proposed and accepted, with the municipalities of Gelfingen, Hämikon, Mosen, Müswangen, Retschwil and Sulz joining Hitzkirch.

== Demographics ==
Gelfingen has a population (as of 2007) of 764, of which 5.4% are foreign nationals. Over the last 10 years the population has grown at a rate of 20.3%. Most of the population (as of 2000) speaks German (94.1%), with English being second most common ( 1.4%) and Portuguese being third ( 1.0%).

In the 2007 election the most popular party was the CVP which received 35.5% of the vote. The next three most popular parties were the SVP (23.3%), the FDP (22.7%) and the Green Party (10.1%).

The age distribution of the population (as of 2000) is children and teenagers (0–19 years old) make up 35.4% of the population, while adults (20–64 years old) make up 56.3% and seniors (over 64 years old) make up 8.3%. The entire Swiss population is generally well educated. In Gelfingen about 77.8% of the population (between age 25–64) have completed either non-mandatory upper secondary education or additional higher education (either University or a Fachhochschule).

Gelfingen has an unemployment rate of 1.21%. As of 2005, there were 62 people employed in the primary economic sector and about 17 businesses involved in this sector. 18 people are employed in the secondary sector and there are 6 businesses in this sector. 65 people are employed in the tertiary sector, with 19 businesses in this sector.

The historical population is given in the following table:

year	population
1678	381
1798	307
1850	497
1900	443
1950	469
2000	709
