= Schongau =

Schongau may refer to:

- Schongau, Bavaria, a town in Germany
- Schongau, Lucerne, a commune in Switzerland
