= Sulz, Lucerne =

Sulz
- Former municipality
- Coat of arms
- Location of Sulz
- Location within Switzerland Location within Canton of Lucerne
- Coordinates: 47°13′N 8°17′E
- Country: Switzerland
- Canton: Lucerne
- District: Hochdorf

Area
  - Total: 3.84 km^{2} (1.48 sq mi)
- Elevation: 661 m (2,169 ft)

Population (December 2007)
  - Total: 186
  - Density: 48.4/km^{2} (125/sq mi)
- Time zone: UTC+01:00 (CET)
  - Summer (DST): UTC+02:00 (CEST)
- Postal code: 6284
- SFOS number: 1042
- ISO 3166 code: CH-LU
- Surrounded by: Beinwil (Freiamt) (AG), Gelfingen, Hämikon, Hitzkirch, Lieli, Müswangen
- Website: keine Website

Sulz (German pronunciation: [zʊlts]) is a former municipality in the district of Hochdorf in the canton of Lucerne in Switzerland. On 1 January 2009, Sulz together with Gelfingen, Hämikon, Mosen, Müswangen, and Retschwil joined Hitzkirch.

== Geography ==
Sulz has an area of 3.9 km^{2} (1.5 sq mi). Of this area, 65.1% is used for agricultural purposes, while 29.5% is forested. The rest of the land, (5.4%) is settled.

On 21 May 2006 an attempt to merge the Hitzkirch and the surrounding 10 municipalities failed, when five of the eleven voted against the merger. A less ambitious merger was then proposed and accepted, with the municipalities of Gelfingen, Hämikon, Mosen, Müswangen, Retschwil and Sulz joining Hitzkirch. The merged municipality has an area of 24.62 km^{2} (9.51 sq mi)

== Demographics ==
Sulz has a population (as of 2007) of 186, of which 4.3% are foreign nationals. Over the last 10 years the population has grown at a rate of 2.8%. Most of the population (as of 2000) speaks German (99.4%), with the rest speaking French (0.6%).

In the 2007 election the most popular party was the CVP which received 39% of the vote. The next three most popular parties were the FDP (37%), the SVP (19.5%) and the Green Party (1.7%).

The age distribution of the population (as of 2000) is children and teenagers (0–19 years old) make up 31.2% of the population, while adults (20–64 years old) make up 60.5% and seniors (over 64 years old) make up 8.3%. In Sulz about 74.7% of the population (between age 25-64) have completed either non-mandatory upper secondary education or additional higher education (either University or a Fachhochschule).

Sulz has an unemployment rate of 0.09%. As of 2005, there were 47 people employed in the primary economic sector and about 16 businesses involved in this sector. 9 people are employed in the secondary sector and there are 3 businesses in this sector. No one is employed in the tertiary sector, and there are no businesses in this sector.
