= Birrwil =

- Municipality
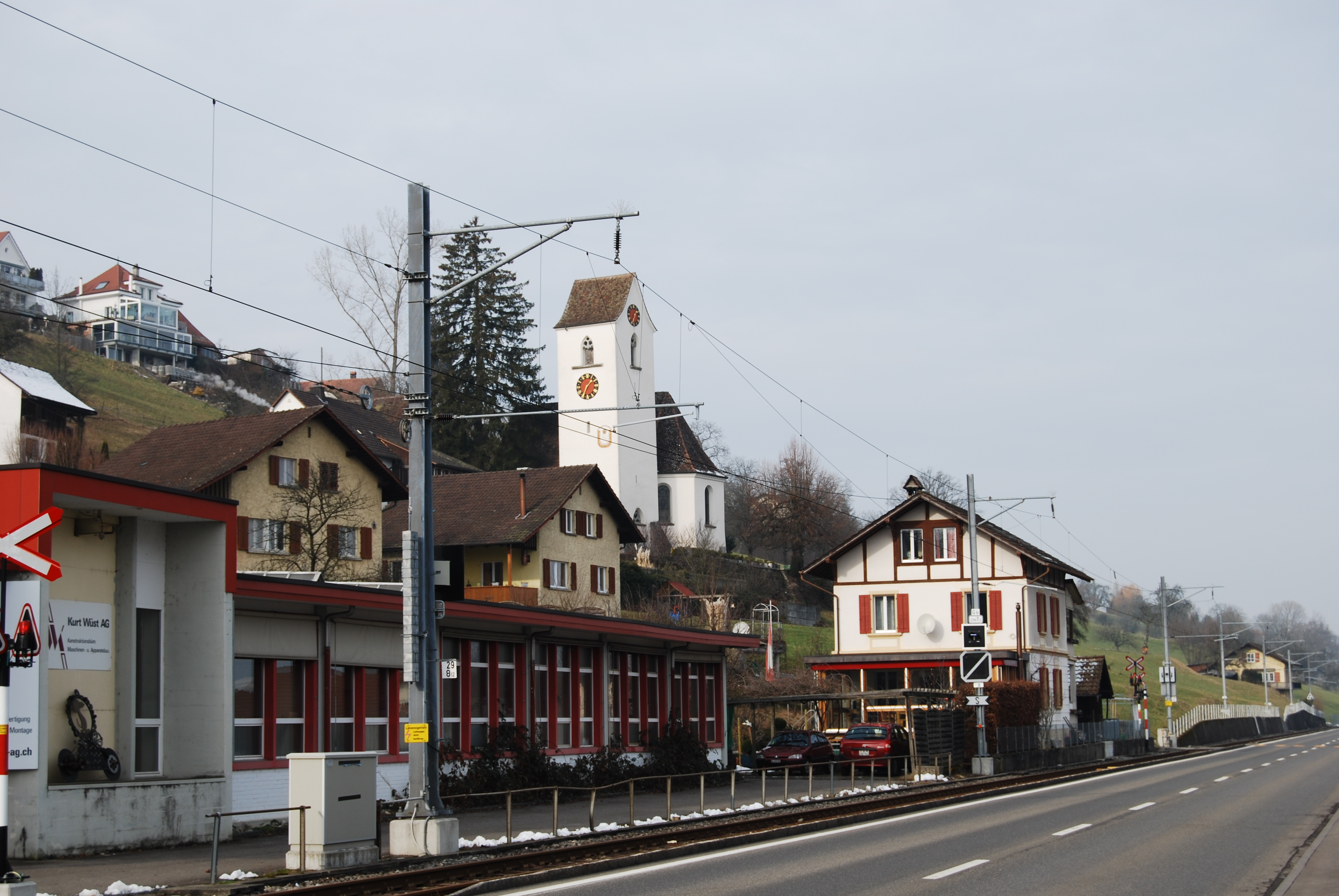

- Flag Coat of arms
- Location of Birrwil
- Location within Switzerland Location within Canton of Aargau
- Coordinates: 47°18′N 8°12′E
- Country: Switzerland
- Canton: Aargau
- District: Kulm

Area
  - Total: 3.42 km^{2} (1.32 sq mi)
- Elevation: 560 m (1,840 ft)

Population (December 2020)
  - Total: 742
  - Density: 217/km^{2} (562/sq mi)
- Time zone: UTC+01:00 (CET)
  - Summer (DST): UTC+02:00 (CEST)
- Postal code: 5708
- SFOS number: 4132
- ISO 3166 code: CH-AG
- Surrounded by: Beinwil am See, Boniswil, Leutwil, Meisterschwanden, Reinach, Seengen, Zetzwil
- Website: www.birrwil.ch

Birrwil is a municipality in the district of Kulm in the canton of Aargau in Switzerland.

Aerial view (1964)

== History ==
Isolated finds of artifacts indicate settlement during the Neolithic, Roman and Alamanni eras. The beginnings of the modern town go back to an Alamanni named Bero (meaning Bear), who founded the village Beriwilare (meaning Bero's village) in the area. Birrwil is first mentioned in 1185 as Beriuuillare.

Between 1185 and 1331 there was a noble von Birrwil family. No traces remain of their family castle. The village was part of the lands of the Counts of Lenzburg, the Kyburgs and the finally the Habsburgs. The power of Zwing und Bann (Manor rights as well as low justice) over the village, was held by the Lords of Hohenklingen through the von Birrwil family. In 1326 those rights were acquired by the Lords of Liebegg who held them until the 1798. Following the Bernese conquest of the Aargau in 1415 became part of Bern until the end of the Old Swiss Confederacy in 1798. The village became part of the Canton of Aargau following the 1803 Act of Mediation. The former manor houses were only fully incorporated in the 19th and 20th century into Birrwil (Schwaderhof 1822, Wilhof 1905).

The village church was first mentioned in 1275. In 1528, during the Protestant Reformation, the church converted to the new religion. In 1689 the old church was replaced by a new one.

Economically, both in the 18th and 19th century the cotton industry was a major source of income. In 1857 the tobacco industry also entered the village. Both of these formerly major industries have vanished from the municipality. As of 1990, 17% of the population was employed in the primary economic sector, 31% in the secondary sector and 52% in the tertiary sector. 72% of the economically active population of Birrwil work outside the community.

== Geography ==
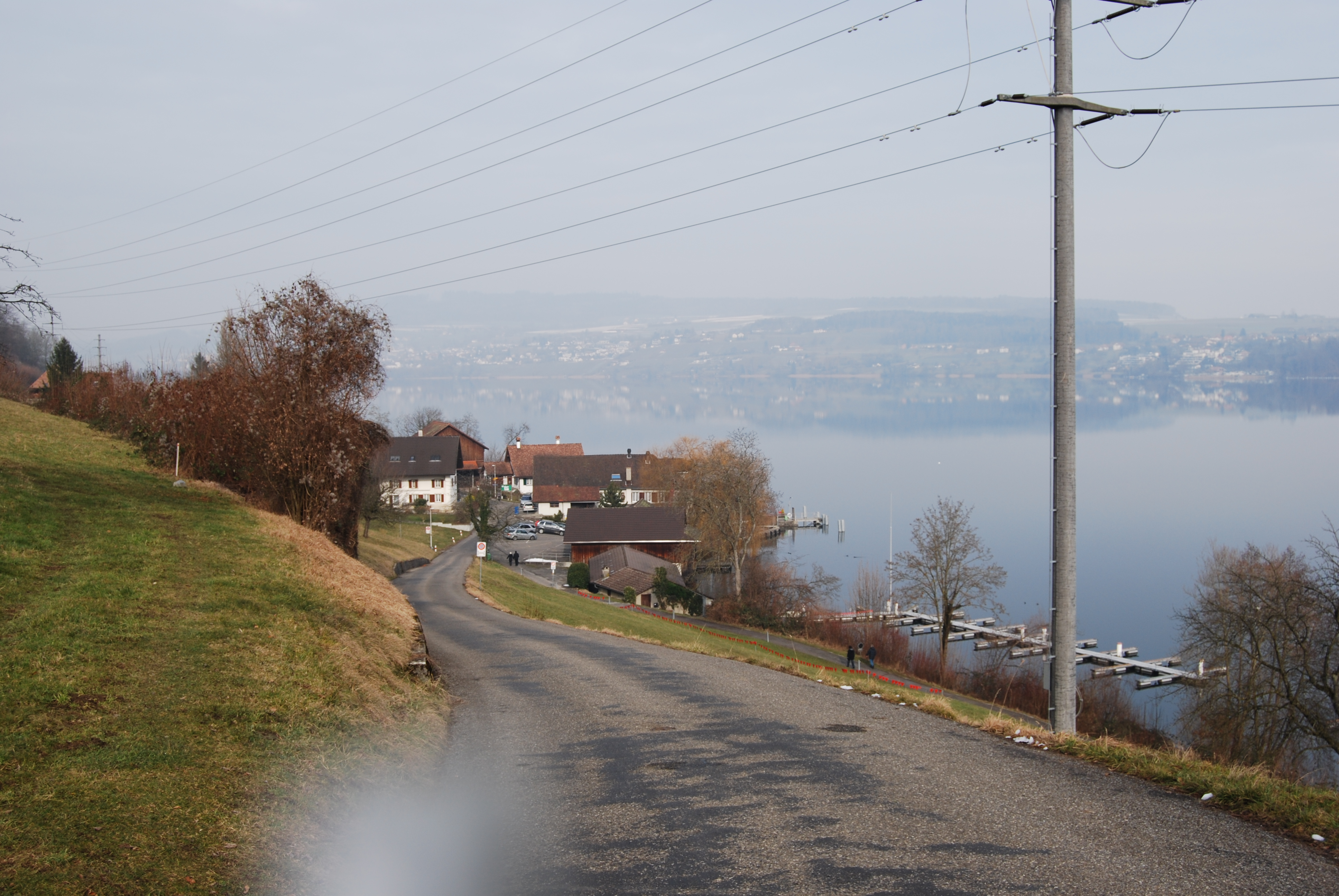
Birrwil and Lake Hallwil

Birrwil is located in the Seetal valley, on the western shore of Lake Hallwil. It is situated on four thin terraces on the steep east slopes of Mounts Eichhalde and Güggeliberg, between 70 and 150 meters (230 and 490 ft) above the lake surface. The shore of the lake is unusually undeveloped. Elevations in the municipality range between 449 and 771 meters (1,473 and 2,530 ft).

Neighboring municipalities are Leutwil in the north-west, Boniswil in the north, Meisterschwanden in the east, Beinwil am See in the south, Reinach in the south-west, and Zetzwil in the west.

The municipality has an area, as of 2009, of 3.42 square kilometers (1.32 sq mi). Of this area, 2.01 square kilometers (0.78 sq mi) or 58.8% is used for agricultural purposes, while 0.98 square kilometers (0.38 sq mi) or 28.7% is forested. Of the rest of the land, 0.45 square kilometers (0.17 sq mi) or 13.2% is settled (buildings or roads).

The built up area can be sub-divided into housing and buildings that made up 8.8% and transportation infrastructure that made up 3.5%. 25.4% of the total land area is heavily forested and 3.2% is covered with orchards or small clusters of trees. Of the agricultural land, 19.0% is used for growing crops and 34.5% is pastures, while 5.3% is used for orchards or vine crops.

== Coat of arms ==
The blazon of the municipal coat of arms is Azure a Pear Branch leaved Vert and fructed Argent and coupeaux of the second. The pear in the coat of arms makes it an example of canting (German: Birne).

== Demographics ==
Birrwil has a population (as of December 2020) of 1,185. As of June 2009, 10.7% of the population are foreign nationals. Over the last 10 years (1997–2007) the population has changed at a rate of -4.5%. Most of the population (as of 2000) speaks German (93.6%), with Albanian being second most common ( 1.1%) and French being third ( 0.8%).

The age distribution, as of 2008, in Birrwil is; 61 children or 6.5% of the population are between 0 and 9 years old and 88 teenagers or 9.4% are between 10 and 19. Of the adult population, 86 people or 9.2% of the population are between 20 and 29 years old. 106 people or 11.3% are between 30 and 39, 166 people or 17.8% are between 40 and 49, and 164 people or 17.5% are between 50 and 59. The senior population distribution is 144 people or 15.4% of the population are between 60 and 69 years old, 79 people or 8.4% are between 70 and 79, there are 33 people or 3.5% who are between 80 and 89, and there are 8 people or 0.9% who are 90 and older.

As of 2000 the average number of residents per living room was 0.49 which is fewer people per room than the cantonal average of 0.57 per room. In this case, a room is defined as space of a housing unit of at least 4 m^{2} (43 sq ft) as normal bedrooms, dining rooms, living rooms, kitchens and habitable cellars and attics. About 61.3% of the total households were owner occupied, or in other words did not pay rent (though they may have a mortgage or a rent-to-own agreement). As of 2000, there were 33 homes with 1 or 2 persons in the household, 184 homes with 3 or 4 persons in the household, and 186 homes with 5 or more persons in the household. The average number of people per household was 2.25 individuals. As of 2000, there were 416 private households (homes and apartments) in the municipality, and an average of 2.3 persons per household. In 2008 there were 184 single family homes (or 39.2% of the total) out of a total of 469 homes and apartments. There were a total of 7 empty apartments for a 1.5% vacancy rate. As of 2007, the construction rate of new housing units was 3.2 new units per 1000 residents.

In the 2007 federal election the most popular party was the SVP which received 34.4% of the vote. The next three most popular parties were the SP (17.4%), the FDP (17.2%) and the Green Party (8.2%).

The entire Swiss population is generally well educated. In Birrwil about 77.8% of the population (between age 25-64) have completed either non-mandatory upper secondary education or additional higher education (either university or a Fachhochschule). Of the school age population (in the 2008/2009 school year), there are 44 students attending primary school in the municipality.

The historical population is given in the following table:

Historical population
| Year | Pop. | ±% |
|---|---|---|
| 1653 | 195 | — |
| 1850 | 972 | +398.5% |
| 1870 | 1,005 | +3.4% |
| 1900 | 850 | −15.4% |
| 1941 | 806 | −5.2% |
| 1950 | 845 | +4.8% |
| 1975 | 878 | +3.9% |
| 1980 | 941 | +7.2% |
| 1990 | 944 | +0.3% |
| 2000 | 960 | +1.7% |

== Economy ==
As of 2007, Birrwil had an unemployment rate of 2.16%. As of 2005, there were 36 people employed in the primary economic sector and about 16 businesses involved in this sector. 57 people are employed in the secondary sector and there are 15 businesses in this sector. 111 people are employed in the tertiary sector, with 40 businesses in this sector.

In 2000 there were 506 workers who lived in the municipality. Of these, 392 or about 77.5% of the residents worked outside Birrwil while 58 people commuted into the municipality for work. There were a total of 172 jobs (of at least 6 hours per week) in the municipality. Of the working population, 9.7% used public transportation to get to work, and 60% used a private car.

== Religion ==
From the 2000 census, 217 or 22.6% were Roman Catholic, while 557 or 58.0% belonged to the Swiss Reformed Church. Of the rest of the population, there were 3 individuals (or about 0.31% of the population) who belonged to the Christian Catholic faith.
