= Beinwil am See =

- Municipality
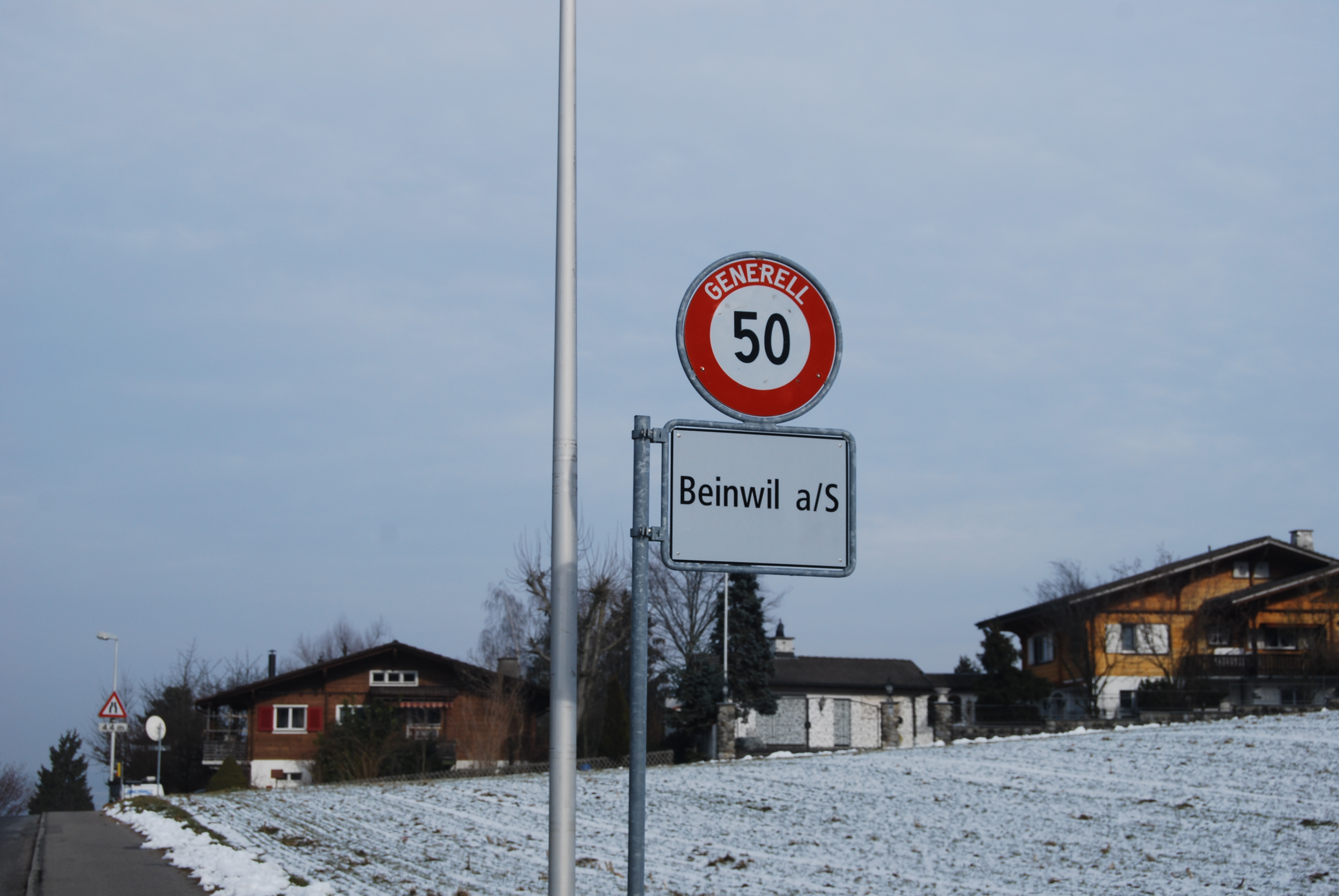

- Flag Coat of arms
- Location of Beinwil am See
- Location within Switzerland Location within Canton of Aargau
- Coordinates: 47°16′N 8°12′E
- Country: Switzerland
- Canton: Aargau
- District: Kulm

Area
  - Total: 3.84 km^{2} (1.48 sq mi)
- Elevation: 520 m (1,710 ft)

Population (December 2020)
  - Total: 3,418
  - Density: 890/km^{2} (2,310/sq mi)
- Time zone: UTC+01:00 (CET)
  - Summer (DST): UTC+02:00 (CEST)
- Postal code: 5712
- SFOS number: 4131
- ISO 3166 code: CH-AG
- Surrounded by: Aesch (LU), Beromünster (LU), Birrwil, Fahrwangen, Meisterschwanden, Menziken, Reinach
- Website: www.beinwilamsee.ch

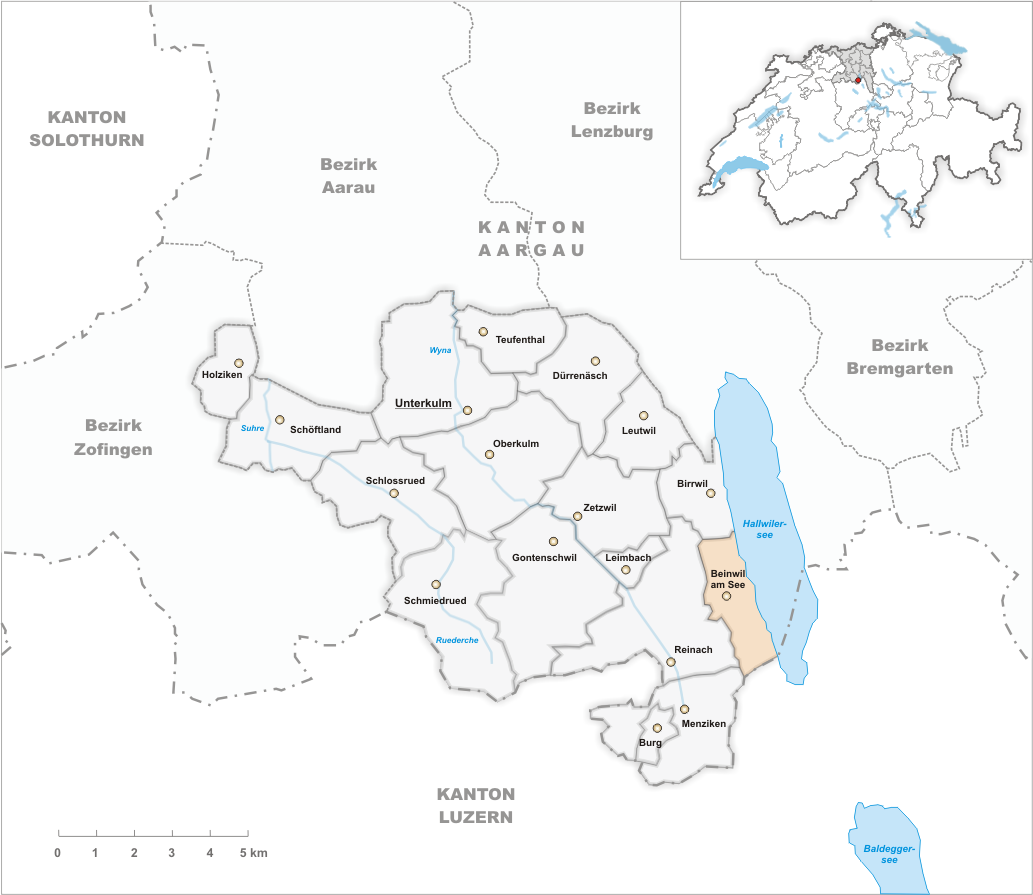
Beinwil am See

Beinwil am See is a municipality in the district of Kulm in the canton of Aargau in Switzerland.

With a population of 3,418 as of December 2020, it's known for its diverse history dating back to the Neolithic era. It transitioned from a farming village to an industrial center over the years. At the present the town has a substantial production of cigars, candy, glass and mirrors, electric motors, electronics, and construction materials testing technology. The town came under the jurisdiction of the Canton of Aargau after the collapse of the Helvetic Republic in 1803.

Beinwil has an area of 3.84 square kilometers and is situated in the Seetal valley, near the western edge of Hallwilersee.

The local population is predominantly German-speaking, with a small percentage of Albanian and Italian speakers. The largest political party in the 2007 federal elections was the Swiss People's Party.

The municipality also contains a UNESCO World Heritage Site—the prehistoric pile-dwelling (or stilt house) settlements around the Alps. The local rail services connect to Lucerne in the south and Lenzburg in the north.

== History ==
There are traces of Neolithic, Hallstatt, Roman and Alamanni settlements in or near Beinwil. However, Beinwil am See is first mentioned in 1036 as Beinwile. In 1045 it was mentioned as Peinuuilare. The noble von Beinwil family is first mentioned in 1153. This family was, in succession, vassals to the Lenzburg, Kyburg and Habsburgs before becoming extinct in the mid-14th century. The family castle has disappeared. The power of Zwing und Bann (Manor rights as well as low justice) over the village, were inherited in about 1300 by the Stewards of Wolhusen, then donated in 1501 to Beromünster, and sold in 1520 to Bern. The Counts of Hallwyl owned land on the lake (Dingstätte) to safeguard their maritime rights, which were first stipulated in 1419.

Starting with the conquest of the Aargau in 1415 by Bern, until the French conquest and creation of the Helvetic Republic in 1798, the rights to high and low justice were held by the bailiff in Lenzburg. Following the collapse of the Helvetic Republic and the creation of the Canton of Aargau in the 1803 Act of Mediation, Beinwil came to the newly formed Canton.

Religiously it originally belonging to the Pfeffikon parish, though it had a chapel that predates written records. This chapel was demolished in 1852. In 1528 the Reformation entered the village and it joined the Reformed parish of Reinach. It has been a separate parish since 1932, and in 1935 the local parish church was consecrated. In 1964 the Roman Catholic Church of St. Martin was built in the municipality to service the growing diaspora community of Menziken-Reinach.

Economically, the decline in the 18th century of imported cotton processing was mitigated by the increasingly dominant tobacco industry (first factory in 1841). Today, the industrial focus of the municipality is the manufacture of cigars, candy, glass and mirrors, electric motors, electronics and technology for testing construction materials. In 1990 the secondary sector provided 42% of jobs, while the tertiary sector provided 53%. About 55% of the work force commuted into the municipality while 59% of the work force commuted away. Beinwil is a station on the Seetalbahn which runs from Lenzburg to Lucerne and also the Beinwil-Beromünster bus route.

== Geography ==
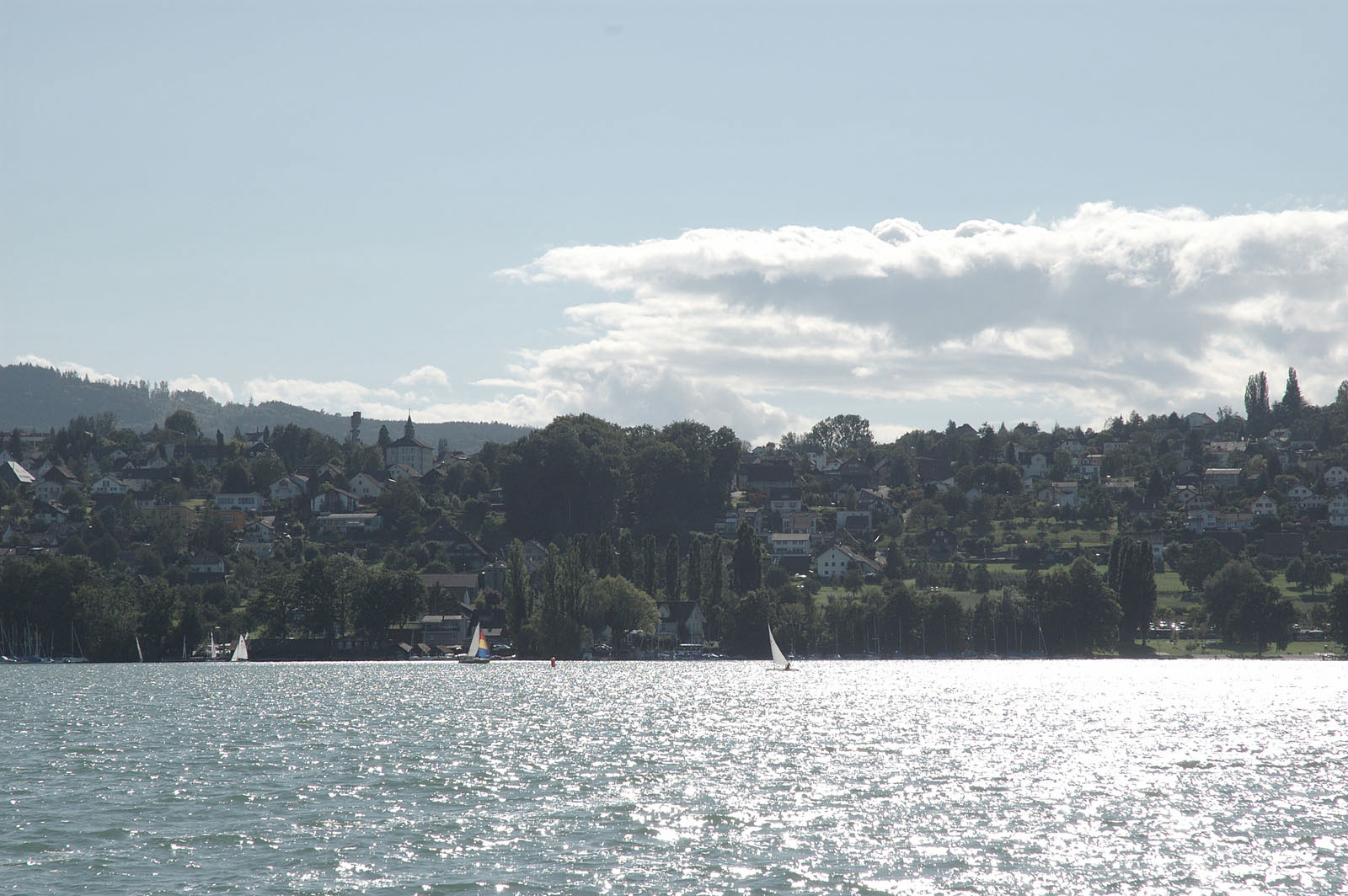
Beinwil am See village from across the Hallwilersee

Beinwil am See is located in the Seetal valley, on the western edge of the Hallwilersee. Originally a farming village, it has grown into an industrial center.

The municipality has an area, as of 2009, of 3.84 square kilometers (1.48 sq mi). Of this area, 1.84 square kilometers (0.71 sq mi) or 47.9% is used for agricultural purposes, while 0.76 square kilometers (0.29 sq mi) or 19.8% is forested. Of the rest of the land, 1.22 square kilometers (0.47 sq mi) or 31.8% is settled (buildings or roads), 0.01 km^{2} (2.5 acres) or 0.3% is either rivers or lakes and 0.02 km^{2} (4.9 acres) or 0.5% is unproductive land.

Of the built up area, industrial buildings made up 1.8% of the total area while housing and buildings made up 20.8% and transportation infrastructure made up 6.8%. while parks, green belts and sports fields made up 1.6%. 17.4% of the total land area is heavily forested and 2.3% is covered with orchards or small clusters of trees. Of the agricultural land, 20.3% is used for growing crops and 19.5% is pastures, while 8.1% is used for orchards or vine crops. All the water in the municipality is in rivers and streams.

== Coat of arms ==
The blazon of the municipal coat of arms is Argent a Pile Azure in bend sinister issuant from base dexter.

== Demographics ==
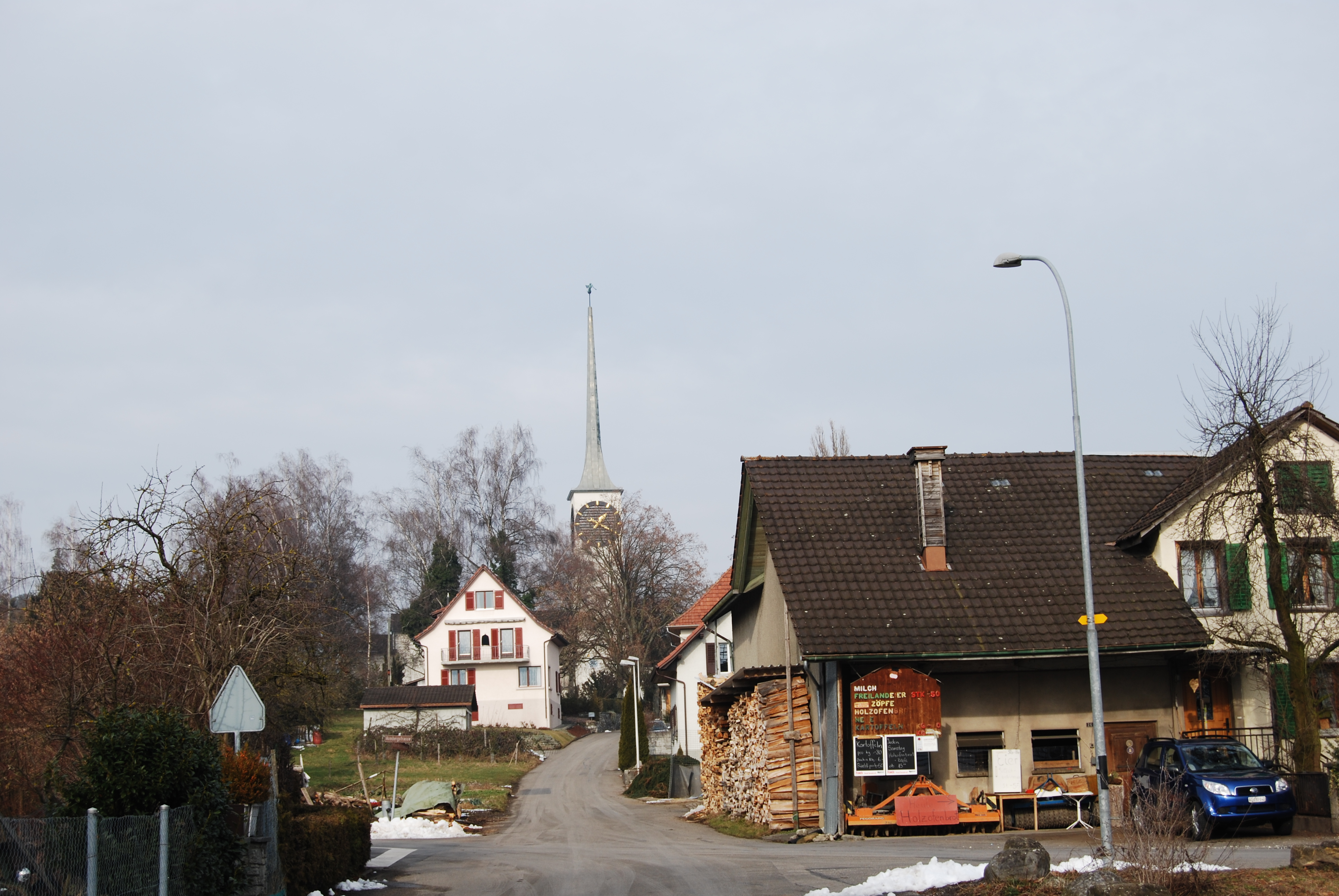
Village church and center of Beinwil

Beinwil am See has a population (as of December 2020) of 3,418 As of June 2009, 9.7% of the population are foreign nationals. Over the last 10 years (1997–2007) the population has changed at a rate of 6.1%. Most of the population (as of 2000) speaks German (94.9%), with Albanian being second most common ( 1.4%) and Italian being third ( 0.7%).

The age distribution, as of 2008, in Beinwil am See is; 232 children or 8.4% of the population are between 0 and 9 years old and 329 teenagers or 11.9% are between 10 and 19. Of the adult population, 288 people or 10.4% of the population are between 20 and 29 years old. 335 people or 12.2% are between 30 and 39, 485 people or 17.6% are between 40 and 49, and 413 people or 15.0% are between 50 and 59. The senior population distribution is 310 people or 11.2% of the population are between 60 and 69 years old, 184 people or 6.7% are between 70 and 79, there are 156 people or 5.7% who are between 80 and 89, and there are 24 people or 0.9% who are 90 and older.

As of 2000 the average number of residents per living room was 0.51 which is fewer people per room than the cantonal average of 0.57 per room. In this case, a room is defined as space of a housing unit of at least 4 m^{2} (43 sq ft) as normal bedrooms, dining rooms, living rooms, kitchens and habitable cellars and attics. About 56.7% of the total households were owner occupied, or in other words did not pay rent (though they may have a mortgage or a rent-to-own agreement).

As of 2000, there were 84 homes with 1 or 2 persons in the household, 463 homes with 3 or 4 persons in the household, and 501 homes with 5 or more persons in the household. The average number of people per household was 2.34 individuals. As of 2000, there were 1,069 private households (homes and apartments) in the municipality, and an average of 2.3 persons per household. In 2008 there were 666 single family homes (or 49.9% of the total) out of a total of 1,334 homes and apartments. There were a total of 8 empty apartments for a 0.6% vacancy rate. As of 2007, the construction rate of new housing units was 11.4 new units per 1000 residents.

In the 2007 federal election the most popular party was the SVP which received 37.6% of the vote. The next three most popular parties were the SP (17.9%), the FDP (15.3%) and the Green Party (10.6%).

In Beinwil am See about 79% of the population (between age 25 and 64) have completed either non-mandatory upper secondary education or additional higher education (either university or a Fachhochschule). Of the school age population (in the 2008/2009 school year), there are 196 students attending primary school, there are 107 students attending secondary school in the municipality.

The historical population is given in the following table:

Historical population
Year	Pop.	±%
1850	1,544	—
1900	1,831	+18.6%
1950	2,271	+24.0%
2000	2,581	+13.7%

== Heritage sites of national significance ==
It is home to one or more prehistoric pile-dwelling (or stilt house) settlements that are part of the Prehistoric Pile dwellings around the Alps UNESCO World Heritage Site. Ägelmoos, a Bronze Age lake shore settlement, is listed as a Swiss heritage site of national significance.

== Economy ==
In 2007, Beinwil am See had an unemployment rate of 1.36%. As of 2005, there were 49 people employed in the primary economic sector and about 16 businesses involved in this sector. 210 people are employed in the secondary sector and there are 37 businesses in this sector. 460 people are employed in the tertiary sector, with 97 businesses in this sector.

In 2000 there were 1,251 workers who lived in the municipality. Of these, 894 or about 71.5% of the residents worked outside Beinwil am See while 421 people commuted into the municipality for work. There were a total of 778 jobs (of at least 6 hours per week) in the municipality. Of the working population, 10.4% used public transportation to get to work, and 52.4% used a private car.

== Religion ==
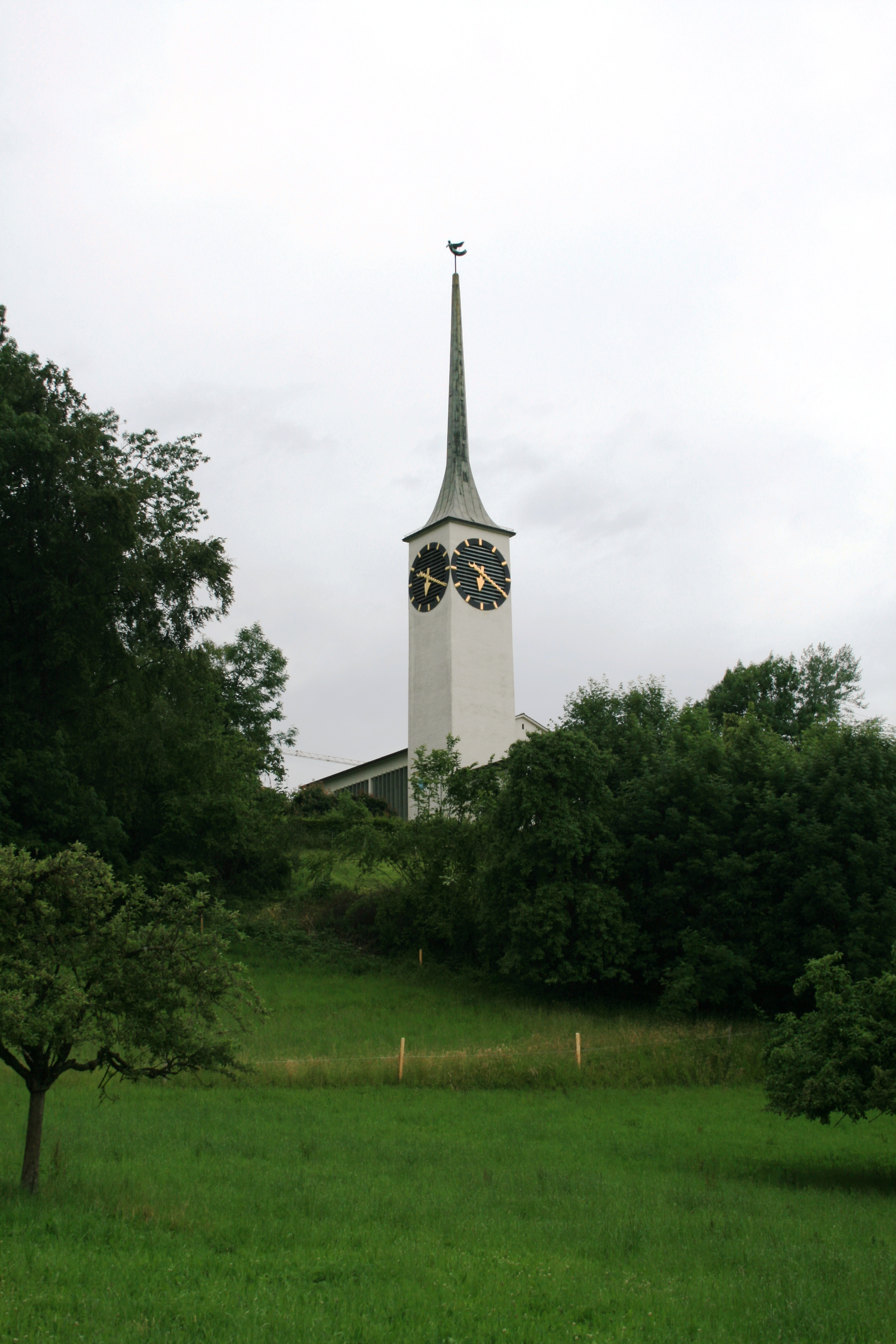
Church of Beinwil

From the 2000 census, 548 or 21.2% were Roman Catholic, while 1,578 or 61.1% belonged to the Swiss Reformed Church. Of the rest of the population, there were 3 individuals (or about 0.12% of the population) who belonged to the Christian Catholic faith.

== Transportation ==
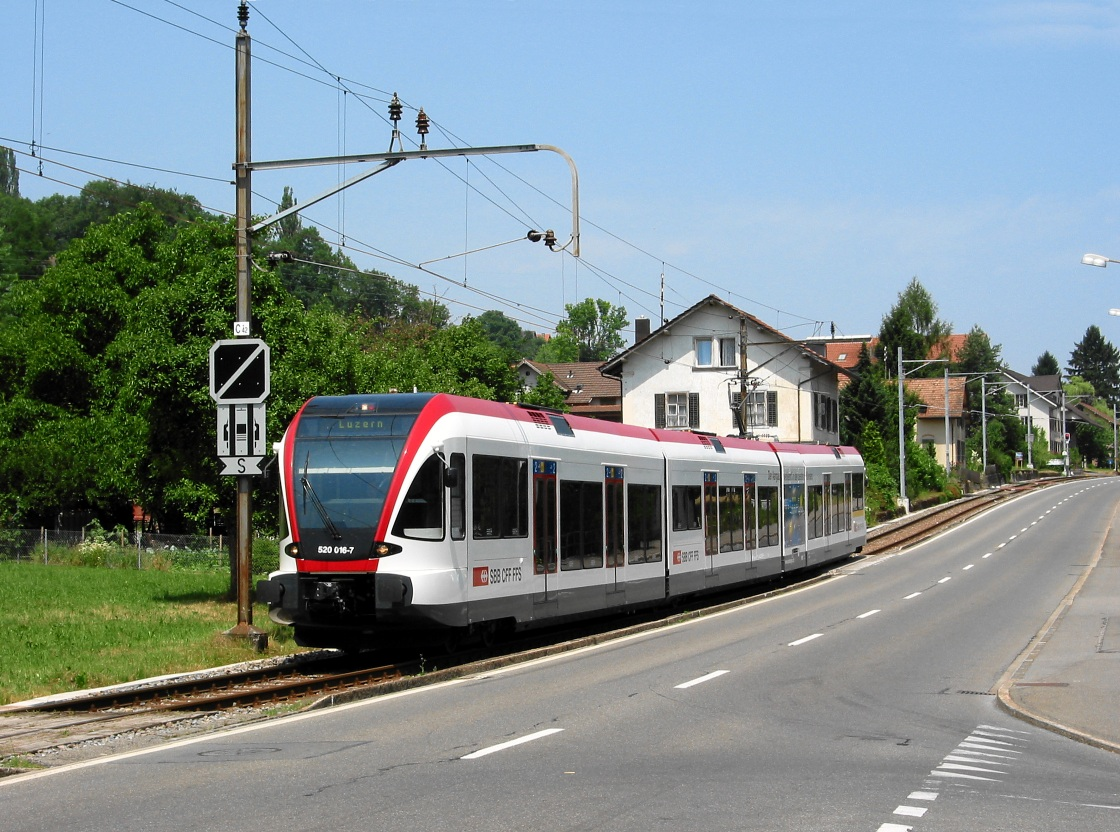
Seetal railway train

Beinwil am See's rail service to Beromünster via Reinach and Menziken, which was serviced by the Swiss Federal Railways (SBB), was replaced by a bus service. The SBB owned Seetal railway line, to Luzern (south) and Lenzburg (north), has been upgraded and is becoming very popular once again.
