= Müswangen =

- Former municipality
- Coat of arms
- Location of Müswangen
- Location within Switzerland Location within Canton of Lucerne
- Coordinates: 47°14′N 8°17′E
- Country: Switzerland
- Canton: Lucerne
- District: Hochdorf

Area
  - Total: 4.50 km^{2} (1.74 sq mi)
- Elevation: 783 m (2,569 ft)

Population (December 2007)
  - Total: 453
  - Density: 101/km^{2} (261/sq mi)
- Time zone: UTC+01:00 (CET)
  - Summer (DST): UTC+02:00 (CEST)
- Postal code: 6289
- SFOS number: 1036
- ISO 3166 code: CH-LU
- Surrounded by: Beinwil (Freiamt) (AG), Buttwil (AG), Geltwil (AG), Hämikon, Schongau, Sulz
- Website: www.mueswangen.ch

Müswangen is a municipality in the district of Hochdorf in the canton of Lucerne in Switzerland. Since 1 January 2009, it has been part of the municipality of Hitzkirch.

== History ==
Müswangen is first mentioned in 924 as Milizwaga.

== Geography ==
Aerial view (1964)

Müswangen has an area of 4.5 km^{2} (1.7 sq mi). Of this area, 70.9% is used for agricultural purposes, while 24.2% is forested. Of the rest of the land, 4.7% is settled (buildings or roads) and the remainder (0.2%) is non-productive (rivers, glaciers or mountains). The municipality is located on the west slope of the Lindenberg mountain.

On 21 May 2006 an attempt to merge Hitzkirch and the surrounding 10 municipalities failed, when five of the eleven voted against the merger. A less ambitious merger was then proposed and accepted, with the municipalities of Gelfingen, Hämikon, Mosen, Müswangen, Retschwil and Sulz joining Hitzkirch on 1 January 2009.

== Demographics ==
Müswangen has a population (as of 2007) of 453, of which 4.6% are foreign nationals. Over the last 10 years the population has grown at a rate of 4.1%. Most of the population (as of 2000) speaks German (95.7%), with Albanian being second most common ( 2.3%) and French being third ( 1.8%).

In the 2007 election the most popular party was the SVP which received 30.2% of the vote. The next three most popular parties were the FDP (28.9%), the CVP (26.5%) and the Green Party (6.8%).

The age distribution of the population (as of 2000) is children and teenagers (0–19 years old) make up 34.6% of the population, while adults (20–64 years old) make up 56.7% and seniors (over 64 years old) make up 8.7%. The entire Swiss population is generally well educated. In Müswangen about 71.9% of the population (between age 25-64) have completed either non-mandatory upper secondary education or additional higher education (either University or a Fachhochschule).

Müswangen has an unemployment rate of 1.05%. As of 2005, there were 61 people employed in the primary economic sector and about 24 businesses involved in this sector. 17 people are employed in the secondary sector and there are 5 businesses in this sector. 36 people are employed in the tertiary sector, with 10 businesses in this sector.

The historical population is given in the following table:

year	population
1798	307
1850	442
1900	324
1950	259
1980	217
2000	439
