= Hämikon =

- Former municipality
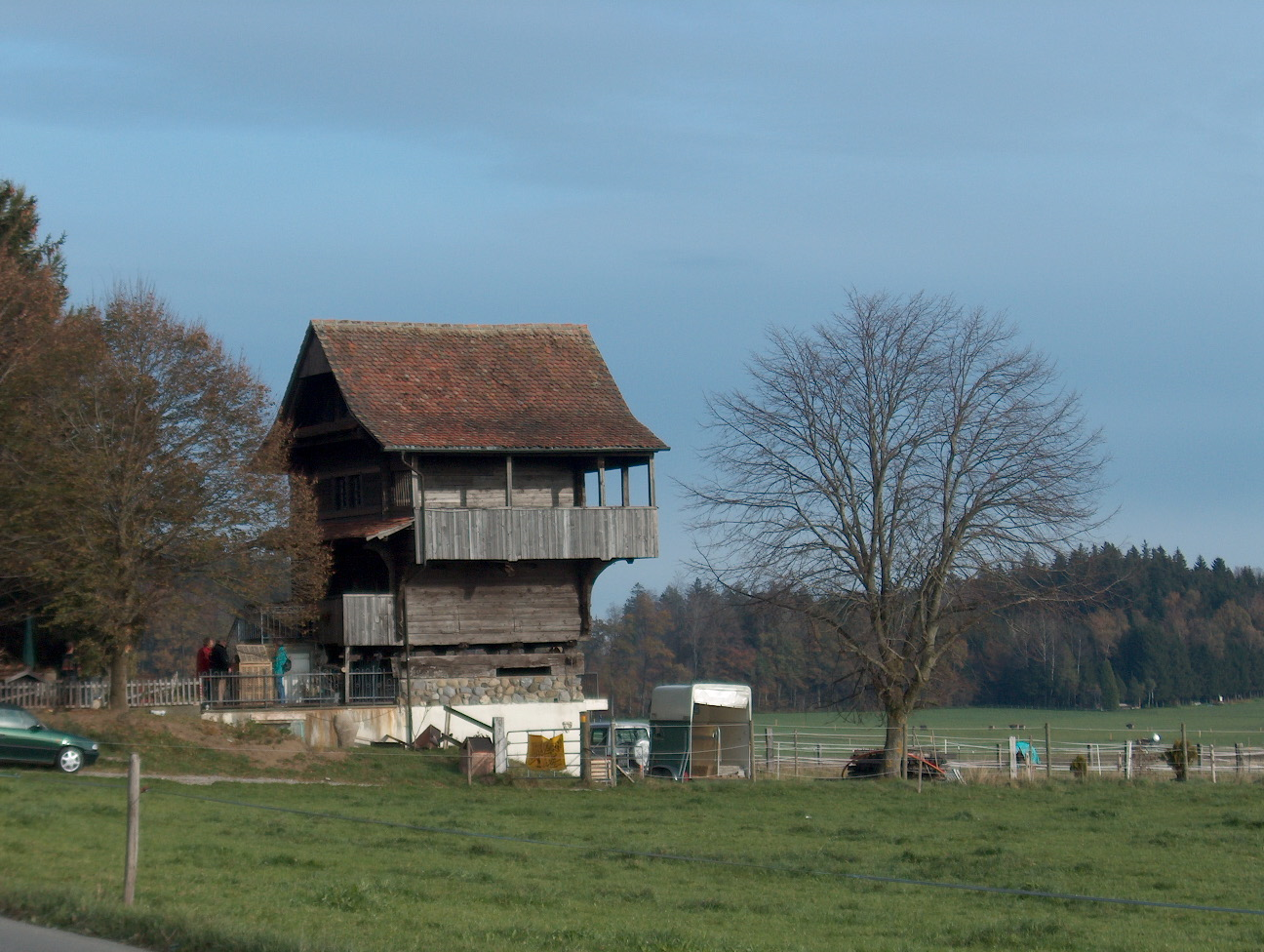

- Coat of arms
- Location of Hämikon
- Location within Switzerland Location within Canton of Lucerne
- Coordinates: 47°14′N 8°17′E
- Country: Switzerland
- Canton: Lucerne
- District: Hochdorf

Area
  - Total: 4.62 km^{2} (1.78 sq mi)
- Elevation: 680 m (2,230 ft)

Population (December 2007)
  - Total: 474
  - Density: 103/km^{2} (266/sq mi)
- Time zone: UTC+01:00 (CET)
  - Summer (DST): UTC+02:00 (CEST)
- Postal code: 6289
- SFOS number: 1028
- ISO 3166 code: CH-LU
- Surrounded by: Aesch, Altwis, Buttwil (AG), Hitzkirch, Müswangen, Schongau, Sulz
- Website: Profile (in German), SFSO statistics

Hämikon is a municipality in the district of Hochdorf in the canton of Lucerne in Switzerland. On 1 January 2009 it became part of the municipality of Hitzkirch.

== History ==
Hämikon is first mentioned in 924 as Hamminchova.

== Geography ==
Hämikon has an area of 4.6 km^{2} (1.8 sq mi). Of this area, 66.8% is used for agricultural purposes, while 27.4% is forested. The rest of the land, (5.8%) is settled. The municipality is located on the western slope of the Lindenberg mountain. On 21 May 2006 an attempt to merge the Hitzkirch and the surrounding 10 municipalities failed, when five of the eleven voted against the merger. A less ambitious merger was then proposed and accepted, with the municipalities of Gelfingen, Hämikon, Mosen, Müswangen, Retschwil and Sulz joining Hitzkirch.

== Demographics ==
Hämikon has a population (as of 2007) of 474, of which 3.6% are foreign nationals. Over the last 10 years the population has grown at a rate of 11.3%. Most of the population (as of 2000) speaks German (97.5%), with Portuguese being second most common ( 0.9%) and Albanian being third ( 0.9%).

In the 2007 election the most popular party was the CVP which received 34.5% of the vote. The next three most popular parties were the SVP (27.8%), the FDP (24%) and the Green Party (5.9%).

The age distribution of the population (as of 2000) is children and teenagers (0–19 years old) make up 33.1% of the population, while adults (20–64 years old) make up 59.2% and seniors (over 64 years old) make up 7.7%. In Hämikon about 70.5% of the population (between age 25-64) have completed either non-mandatory upper secondary education or additional higher education (either University or a Fachhochschule).

Hämikon has an unemployment rate of 1.16%. As of 2005, there were 69 people employed in the primary economic sector and about 22 businesses involved in this sector. 18 people are employed in the secondary sector and there are 3 businesses in this sector. 42 people are employed in the tertiary sector, with 7 businesses in this sector.

The historical population is given in the following table:

year	population
1678	304
1850	588
1900	383
1950	351
1960	297
2000	444
