= Hitzkirch =

- Municipality
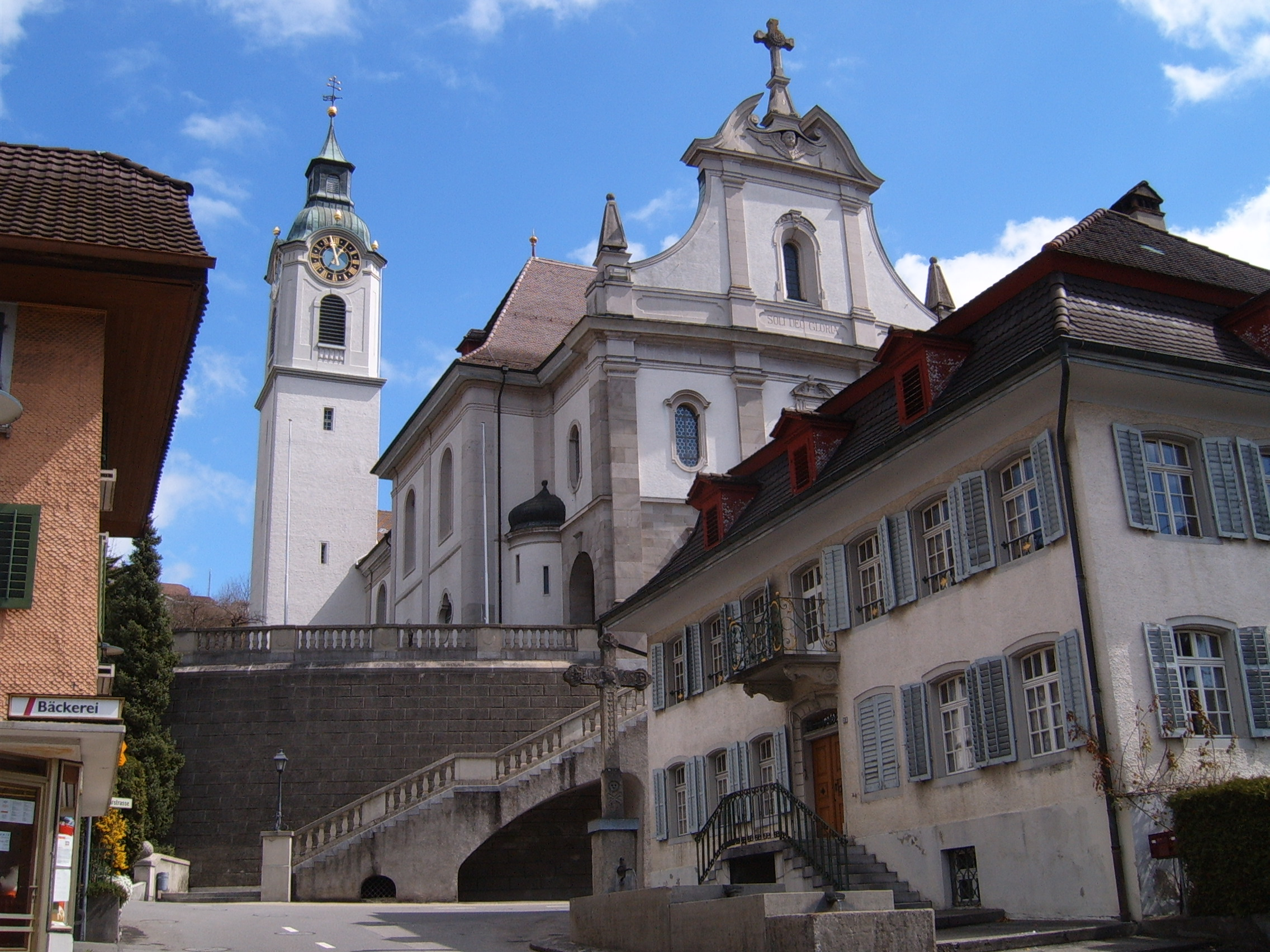

- Coat of arms
- Location of Hitzkirch
- Location within Switzerland Location within Canton of Lucerne
- Coordinates: 47°13′N 8°16′E
- Country: Switzerland
- Canton: Lucerne
- District: Hochdorf

Area
  - Total: 24.62 km^{2} (9.51 sq mi)
- Elevation: 498 m (1,634 ft)

Population (December 2020)
  - Total: 5,455
  - Density: 221.6/km^{2} (573.9/sq mi)
- Time zone: UTC+01:00 (CET)
  - Summer (DST): UTC+02:00 (CEST)
- Postal code: 6285
- SFOS number: 1030
- ISO 3166 code: CH-LU
- Surrounded by: Altwis, Ermensee, Gelfingen, Hämikon, Retschwil, Römerswil, Sulz
- Website: www.hitzkirch.ch

Hitzkirch is a municipality in the district of Hochdorf in the canton of Lucerne in Switzerland. On 1 January 2009, Gelfingen, Hämikon, Mosen, Müswangen, Retschwil and Sulz joined Hitzkirch. On 1 January 2021, Altwis merged into Hitzkirch.

== History ==
Hitzkirch is first mentioned in 1230 as Hiltschilche.

=== Altwis ===
Altwis is first mentioned in 1113 as Altwise.

== Geography ==
Aerial view by Walter Mittelholzer (1923)

Hitzkirchis is located in the Seetal valley, at the foot of the Lindenberg mountain.

After the 2021 merger, Hitzkirch has an area, (as of the 2004/09 survey), of 27.61 km^{2} (10.66 sq mi). Of this area, 66% is used for agricultural purposes, while 14% is forested. Of the rest of the land, 19.7% is settled (buildings or roads) and the remainder (0.3%) is non-productive (rivers, glaciers or mountains). In the 1997 land survey, 23.76% of the total land area was forested. Of the agricultural land, 59.83% is used for farming or pastures, while 7.31% is used for orchards or vine crops. Of the settled areas, 4.79% is covered with buildings, 0.41% is industrial, 0.28% is classed as special developments, 0.24% is parks or greenbelts and 3.05% is transportation infrastructure. Of the unproductive areas, 0.08% is unproductive standing water (ponds or lakes), 0.12% is unproductive flowing water (rivers) and 0.12% is other unproductive land.

On 21 May 2006 an attempt to merge the Hitzkirch and the surrounding 10 municipalities failed, when five of the eleven voted against the merger. A less ambitious merger was then proposed and accepted, with the municipalities of Gelfingen, Hämikon, Mosen, Müswangen, Retschwil and Sulz joining Hitzkirch.

== Demographics ==
Hitzkirch has a population (as of 31 December 2020) of 5,455. As of 2007, 18.9% of the population was made up of foreign nationals. The combined municipality has a population of 4,588 of which 11.6% are foreign. Over the last 10 years the population has grown at a rate of 3.7%. Most of the population (as of 2000) speaks German (87.8%), with Albanian being second most common ( 4.3%) and Serbo-Croatian being third ( 3.3%).

In the 2007 election the most popular party was the CVP which received 34.1% of the vote. The next three most popular parties were the SVP (24.6%), the FDP (21.3%) and the SPS (11.2%).

The age distribution in Hitzkirch is; 1,282 people or 27.7% of the population is 0–19 years old. 1,116 people or 24.1% are 20–39 years old, and 1,673 people or 36.1% are 40–64 years old. The senior population distribution is 421 people or 9.1% are 65–79 years old, 120 or 2.6% are 80–89 years old and 22 people or 0.5% of the population are 90+ years old.

The entire Swiss population is generally well educated. In Hitzkirch about 68.5% of the population (between age 25-64) have completed either non-mandatory upper secondary education or additional higher education (either university or a Fachhochschule).

As of 2000 there are 1,503 households, of which 347 households (or about 23.1%) contain only a single individual. 228 or about 15.2% are large households, with at least five members. As of 2000 there were 958 inhabited buildings in the municipality, of which 751 were built only as housing, and 207 were mixed use buildings. There were 589 single family homes, 92 double family homes, and 70 multi-family homes in the municipality. Most homes were either two (462) or three (200) story structures. There were only 47 single story buildings and 42 four or more story buildings.

Hitzkirch has an unemployment rate of 1.79%. As of 2005, there were 44 people employed in the primary economic sector and about 14 businesses involved in this sector. 786 people are employed in the secondary sector and there are 28 businesses in this sector. 680 people are employed in the tertiary sector, with 76 businesses in this sector. As of 2000 50.9% of the population of the municipality were employed in some capacity. At the same time, females made up 42% of the workforce.

In the 2000 census the religious membership of Hitzkirch was; 3,347 (74.6%) were Roman Catholic, and 448 (10.%) were Protestant, with an additional 83 (1.85%) that were of some other Christian faith. There are 1 individuals (0.02% of the population) who are Jewish. There are 234 individuals (5.22% of the population) who are Muslim. Of the rest; there were 43 (0.96%) individuals who belong to another religion, 192 (4.28%) who do not belong to any organized religion, 139 (3.1%) who did not answer the question.

== Historic Population ==
The historical population is given in the following chart:

== World heritage site ==
It is home to the Seematte prehistoric pile-dwelling (or stilt house) settlements that is part of the Prehistoric Pile dwellings around the Alps UNESCO World Heritage Site.

Seematte was the site of a number of Neolithic settlements from the Cortaillod, Pfyn, Horgen and Corded Ware cultures. The site covers a strip about 400 m (1,300 ft) long along the northern end of Lake Baldegg. First discovered in 1860, it was excavated again in 1871 and 1922 and about 600 m^{2} (6,500 sq ft) were excavated in 1938. During that excavation, two Cortaillod layers, the bottom was 15 cm (5.9 in) thick while the top was 100 cm (39 in), were discovered. A number of ceramic, stone, flint, bone and antler items were found.
