= Lindenberg (Switzerland) =

Mountain in Switzerland

- Location within Switzerland

Highest point
- Elevation: 878 m (2,881 ft)
- Prominence: 358 m (1,175 ft)
- Parent peak: Napf
- Isolation: 16.3 km (10.1 mi)
- Coordinates: 47°15′13″N 8°17′35″E

Geography
- Location: Lucerne, Switzerland (massif partially in Aargau)

The Lindenberg (Swiss Standard German pronunciation: [ˈlɪndn̩ˌbɛrɡ]), peaking at 878 m, is a wooded hill in the Swiss Plateau north of the Alps, situated between the valleys of the Aabach, the Bünz and the Reuss. The hill draws a straight north–south line. On his ridge lies the border between the cantons of Lucerne (western slope) and Aargau (eastern slope and the northern half of the hill). Although the highest peak lies in the canton of Lucerne in the municipality of Müswangen, around 75% of the hill lies in the Aargau. The highest point is unspectacular as it is very flat and wooded; it can be reached by foot, by bike or even by jeep. Despite being overgrown with large forests and fields, many villages are situated on the hill's slopes and at its base, some of the bigger are Muri AG, Sins, Hochdorf and Hitzkirch. The hill is a frequently used place for bikers, hikers, equestrians and families, as several restaurants exist on various places of the hill. Despite his low altitude for Swiss standards, at some points the view is quite a sight as Lake Zug, Lake Hallwil and Lake Baldegg and prominent Swiss mountains as Säntis, Tödi, Titlis and Finsteraarhorn can be seen from some places, like Horben.

== See also ==
- List of most isolated mountains of Switzerland
