= Mosen, Lucerne =

Mosen
- Former municipality
- Coat of arms
- Location of Mosen
- Location within Switzerland Location within Canton of Lucerne
- Coordinates: 47°15′N 8°14′E
- Country: Switzerland
- Canton: Lucerne
- District: Hochdorf

Area
  - Total: 1.73 km^{2} (0.67 sq mi)
- Elevation: 458 m (1,503 ft)

Population (December 2007)
  - Total: 284
  - Density: 164/km^{2} (425/sq mi)
- Time zone: UTC+01:00 (CET)
  - Summer (DST): UTC+02:00 (CEST)
- Postal code: 6295
- SFOS number: 1035
- ISO 3166 code: CH-LU
- Surrounded by: Aesch, Altwis, Beromünster, Ermensee
- Website: Profile (in German), SFSO statistics

Mosen is a former municipality in the district of Hochdorf in the canton of Lucerne in Switzerland. On 1 January 2009 it became part of the municipality of Hitzkirch.

== History ==
Mosen is first mentioned in 1045 as Moseheim though this comes from a 14th Century copy. In 1264 it was mentioned as Mosheim.

== Geography ==
Aerial view from 2000 m by Walter Mittelholzer (1927)

Mosen has an area of 1.6 km^{2} (0.62 sq mi). Of this area, 70.9% is used for agricultural purposes, while 15.2% is forested. Of the rest of the land, 11.4% is settled (buildings or roads) and the remainder (2.5%) is non-productive (rivers, glaciers or mountains). The municipality is located in the Seetal valley region on the south end of Lake Hallwil.

On 21 May 2006 an attempt to merge the Hitzkirch and the surrounding 10 municipalities failed, when five of the eleven voted against the merger. A less ambitious merger was then proposed and accepted, with the municipalities of Gelfingen, Hämikon, Mosen, Müswangen, Retschwil and Sulz joining Hitzkirch.

== Demographics ==
Mosen has a population (as of 2007) of 284, of which 6.0% are foreign nationals. Over the last 10 years the population has grown at a rate of 18.3%. Most of the population (as of 2000) speaks German (90.2%), with Albanian being second most common ( 2.8%) and Turkish being third ( 2.0%).

In the 2007 election the most popular party was the SVP which received 38.9% of the vote. The next three most popular parties were the FDP (28.1%), the CVP (27.2%) and the Green Party (2.8%).

The age distribution of the population (as of 2000) is children and teenagers (0–19 years old) make up 31.5% of the population, while adults (20–64 years old) make up 58.7% and seniors (over 64 years old) make up 9.8%. The entire Swiss population is generally well educated. In Mosen about 72.9% of the population (between age 25-64) have completed either non-mandatory upper secondary education or additional higher education (either University or a Fachhochschule).

Mosen has an unemployment rate of 1.33%. As of 2005, there were 21 people employed in the primary economic sector and about 7 businesses involved in this sector. 141 people are employed in the secondary sector and there are 3 businesses in this sector. 21 people are employed in the tertiary sector, with 10 businesses in this sector.

The historical population is given in the following table:

year	population
1798	165
1850	217
1900	166
1950	177
2000	254
