= Aesch, Lucerne =

Aesch
- Municipality
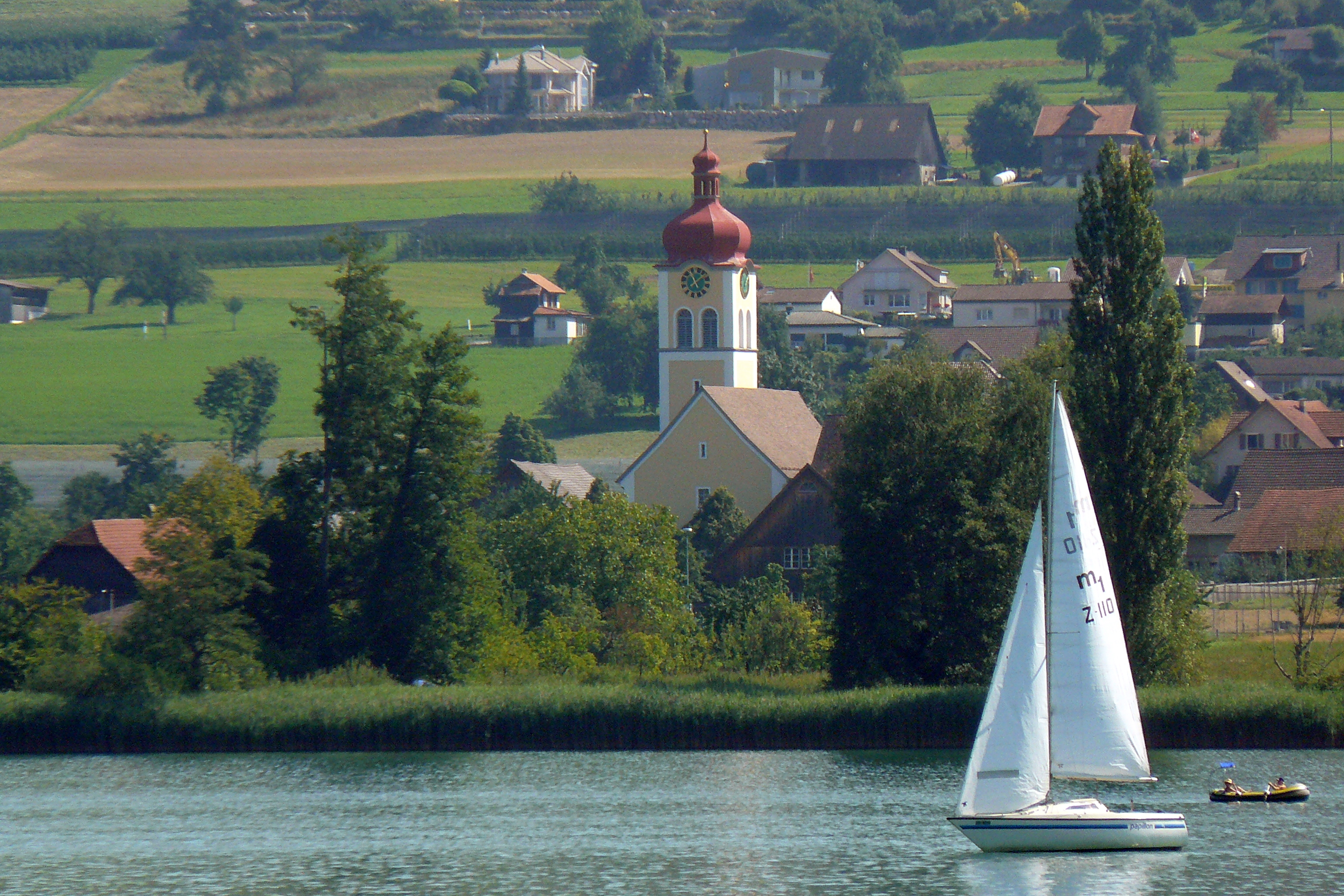

- Flag Coat of arms
- Location of Aesch
- Location within Switzerland Location within Canton of Lucerne
- Coordinates: 47°15′N 8°14′E
- Country: Switzerland
- Canton: Lucerne
- District: Hochdorf

Area
  - Total: 5.80 km^{2} (2.24 sq mi)
- Elevation: 482 m (1,581 ft)

Population (December 2020)
  - Total: 1,285
  - Density: 222/km^{2} (574/sq mi)
- Time zone: UTC+01:00 (CET)
  - Summer (DST): UTC+02:00 (CEST)
- Postal code: 6287
- SFOS number: 1021
- ISO 3166 code: CH-LU
- Surrounded by: Altwis, Beinwil am See (AG), Beromünster, Fahrwangen (AG), Hämikon, Mosen, Schongau
- Website: www.aesch-lu.ch

Aesch is a municipality in the district of Hochdorf in the canton of Lucerne in Switzerland.

== History ==
Aesch is first mentioned around 1150 as Esche. Between 1184 and 1190, it was mentioned as Asce.

== Geography ==
Aerial view (1964)

Aesch is located in the Seetal valley, on the shore of Lake Hallwil, and along the road between Lucerne and Fahrwangen.

The municipality consists of the village of Aesch. It has an area of 4.7 km^{2} (1.8 sq mi). Of this area, 67.6% is used for agricultural purposes, while 19.3% is forested. Of the rest of the land, 10.1% is settled (buildings or roads) and the remainder (3%) is non-productive (rivers, glaciers or mountains). In the 1997 land survey, 19.35% of the total land area was forested. Of the agricultural land, 51.83% is used for farming or pastures, while 15.91% is used for orchards or vine crops. Of the settled areas, 7.31% is covered with buildings, 0.65% is industrial, 0.22% is classed as special developments, 0.43% is parks or greenbelts and 1.51% is transportation infrastructure.

== Demographics ==
Aesch has a population (as of 31 December 2020) of 1,285. As of 2007, 7.8% of the population was made up of foreign nationals. Over the last 10 years the population has decreased at a rate of −3.5%. Most of the population (as of 2000) speaks German (95.9%), with Albanian being second most common ( 1.7%) and Serbo-Croatian being third ( 0.5%).

In the 2007 election the most popular party was the SVP which received 33.2% of the vote. The next three most popular parties were the CVP (32.8%), the FDP (22.8%) and the Green Party (4.9%).

The age distribution in Aesch is; 241 people or 25.3% of the population is 0–19 years old. 222 people or 23.3% are 20–39 years old, and 345 people or 36.3% are 40–64 years old. The senior population distribution is 108 people or 11.4% are 65–79 years old, 32 or 3.4% are 80–89 years old and 3 people or 0.3% of the population are 90+ years old.

In Aesch about 71.5% of the population (between age 25 and 64) have completed either non-mandatory upper secondary education or additional higher education (either university or a Fachhochschule).

As of 2000 there are 359 households, of which 96 households (or about 26.7%) contain only a single individual. 56 or about 15.6% are large households, with at least five members. As of 2000 there were 228 inhabited buildings in the municipality, of which 167 were built only as housing, and 61 were mixed use buildings. There were 126 single family homes, 24 double family homes, and 17 multi-family homes in the municipality. Most homes were either two (96) or three (54) story structures. There were only 6 single story buildings and 11 four or more story buildings.

Aesch has an unemployment rate of 1.03%. As of 2005, there were 92 people employed in the primary economic sector and about 28 businesses involved in this sector. 168 people are employed in the secondary sector and there are 20 businesses in this sector. 93 people are employed in the tertiary sector, with 25 businesses in this sector. As of 2000 51.4% of the population of the municipality were employed in some capacity. At the same time, females made up 41.6% of the workforce.

In the 2000 census the religious membership of Aesch was; 697 (73.4%) were Roman Catholic, and 146 (15.4%) were Protestant, with an additional 9 (0.95%) that were of some other Christian faith. There are 35 individuals (3.68% of the population) who are Muslim. Of the rest; there were 1 (0.11%) individuals who belong to another religion, 41 (4.32%) who do not belong to any organized religion, 21 (2.21%) who did not answer the question.

The historical population is given in the following table:

year	population
1678	176^{a}
1701	380^{b}
1798	584
1837	876
1888	627
1900	639
1950	642
1960	563
2000	950

^a Population only for Oberaesch
^b Total church members of the parish of Aesch

== Weather ==
Aesch has an average of 133.3 days of rain per year and on average receives 1,034 mm (40.7 in) of precipitation. The wettest month is June during which time Aesch receives an average of 123 mm (4.8 in) of precipitation. During this month there is precipitation for an average of 12.5 days. The month with the most days of precipitation is May, with an average of 12.9, but with only 99 mm (3.9 in) of precipitation. The driest month of the year is October with an average of 65 mm (2.6 in) of precipitation over 12.5 days.
