= Retschwil =

- Former municipality
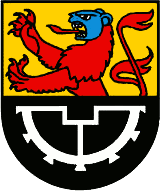
- Coat of arms
- Location of Retschwil
- Location within Switzerland Location within Canton of Lucerne
- Coordinates: 47°12′N 8°15′E
- Country: Switzerland
- Canton: Lucerne
- District: Hochdorf

Area
  - Total: 2.55 km^{2} (0.98 sq mi)
- Elevation: 482 m (1,581 ft)

Population (December 2007)
  - Total: 174
  - Density: 68.2/km^{2} (177/sq mi)
- Time zone: UTC+01:00 (CET)
  - Summer (DST): UTC+02:00 (CEST)
- Postal code: 6285
- SFOS number: 1038
- ISO 3166 code: CH-LU
- Surrounded by: Gelfingen, Hitzkirch, Römerswil
- Website: Profile (in German), SFSO statistics

Retschwil was a municipality in the district of Hochdorf, in the canton of Lucerne, Switzerland. On 1 January 2009, Retschwil together with Gelfingen, Hämikon, Mosen, Müswangen, and Sulz joined Hitzkirch.

== Geography ==
Retschwil has an area of 2.6 km^{2} (1.0 sq mi). Of this area, 67.2% is used for agricultural purposes, while 25% is forested. The rest of the land, (7.8%) is settled.

On 21 May 2006 an attempt to merge the Hitzkirch and the surrounding 10 municipalities failed, when five of the eleven voted against the merger. A less ambitious merger was then proposed and accepted, with the municipalities of Gelfingen, Hämikon, Mosen, Müswangen, Retschwil and Sulz joining Hitzkirch. The merged municipality has an area of 24.62 km^{2} (9.51 sq mi).

== Demographics ==
Retschwil has a population (as of 2007) of 174, of which 1.7% are foreign nationals. Over the last 10 years the population has decreased at a rate of -3.9%. Most of the population (as of 2000) speaks German (96.3%), with Portuguese being second most common ( 2.6%) and French being third ( 0.5%).

In the 2007 election the most popular party was the CVP which received 36.6% of the vote. The next three most popular parties were the SVP (30.6%), the FDP (22.1%) and the Green Party (6.8%).

Children and teenagers (0–19 years old) make up 34% of the population, while adults (20–64 years old) make up 56.5% and seniors (over 64 years old) make up 9.4% (as of 2000). In Retschwil about 74.2% of the population (between age 25-64) have completed either non-mandatory upper secondary education or additional higher education (either University or a Fachhochschule).

Retschwil has an unemployment rate of 0.58%. As of 2005, there were 37 people employed in the primary economic sector and about 12 businesses involved in this sector. 5 people are employed in the secondary sector and there is 1 business in this sector. 16 people are employed in the tertiary sector, with 5 businesses in this sector.
