= Schongau, Lucerne =

Schongau
- Municipality
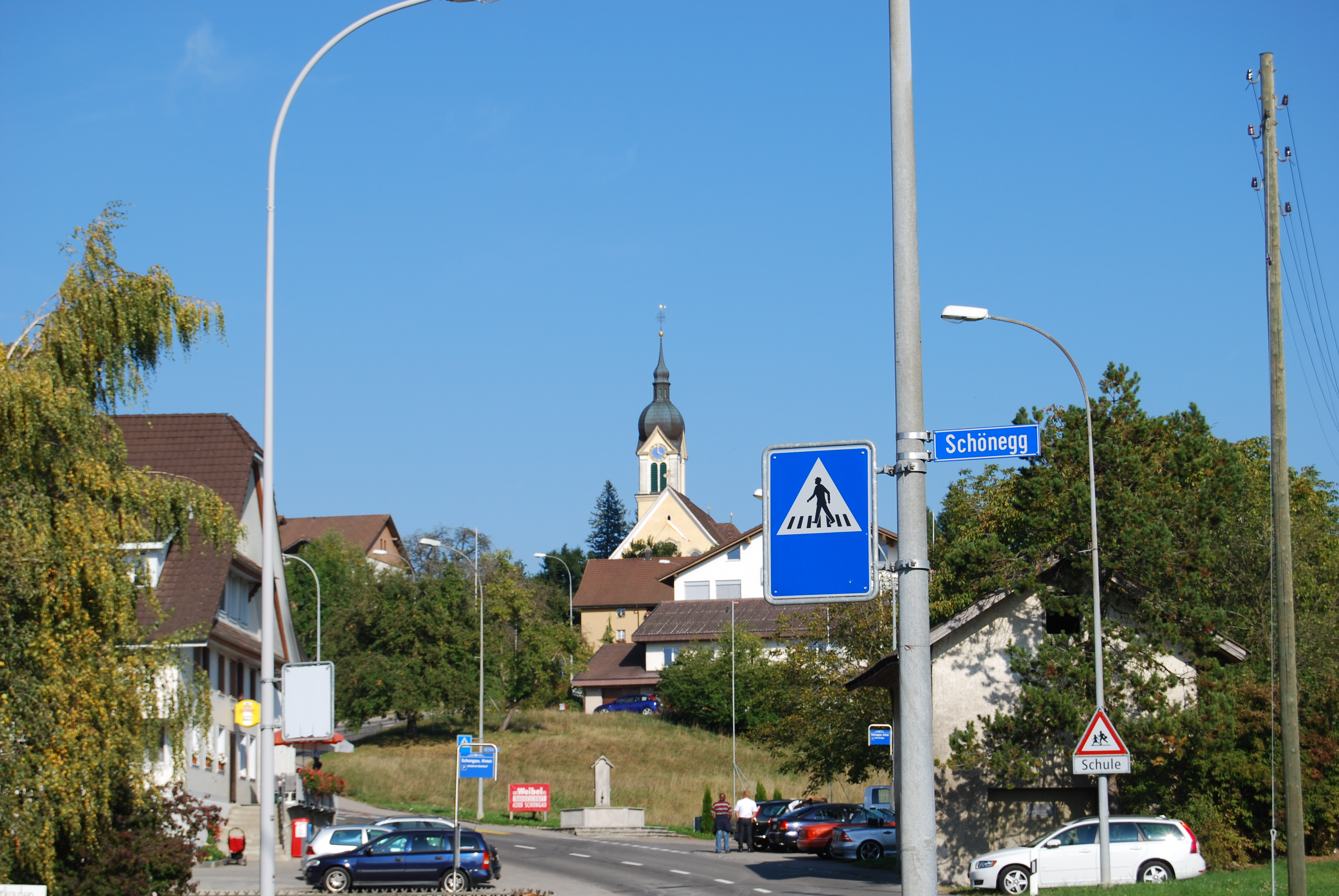

- Coat of arms
- Location of Schongau
- Location within Switzerland Location within Canton of Lucerne
- Coordinates: 47°16′N 8°16′E
- Country: Switzerland
- Canton: Lucerne
- District: Hochdorf

Area
  - Total: 12.46 km^{2} (4.81 sq mi)
- Elevation: 639 m (2,096 ft)

Population (December 2007)
  - Total: 848
  - Density: 68.1/km^{2} (176/sq mi)
- Time zone: UTC+01:00 (CET)
  - Summer (DST): UTC+02:00 (CEST)
- Postal code: 6288
- SFOS number: 1041
- ISO 3166 code: CH-LU
- Surrounded by: Aesch, Bettwil (AG), Buttwil (AG), Fahrwangen (AG), Hämikon, Müswangen
- Website: www.schongau.ch

Schongau (German pronunciation: [ˈʃoːnɡaʊ]) is a municipality in the district of Hochdorf in the canton of Lucerne in Switzerland.

== Geography ==
Aerial view (1964)

Schongau is located in the Seetal valley.

The municipality has an area of 12.5 km^{2} (4.8 sq mi). Of this area, 70.4% is used for agricultural purposes, while 26.1% is forested. Of the rest of the land, 3.5% is settled (buildings or roads) and the remainder (0.1%) is non-productive (rivers, glaciers or mountains). In the 1997 land survey, 26.08% of the total land area was forested. Of the agricultural land, 65.41% is used for farming or pastures, while 4.98% is used for orchards or vine crops. Of the settled areas, 2.01% is covered with buildings, 0.08% is industrial, 0.32% is parks or greenbelts and 1.04% is transportation infrastructure. All the unproductive areas are unproductive flowing water (rivers).

== Demographics ==
Schongau has a population (as of 2007) of 848, of which 3.1% are foreign nationals. Over the last 10 years the population has grown at a rate of 13.1%. Most of the population (as of 2000) speaks German (97.3%), with Albanian being second most common ( 1.1%) and Serbo-Croatian being third ( 0.5%).

In the 2007 election the most popular party was the SVP which received 38% of the vote. The next three most popular parties were the CVP (33.9%), the FDP (17.6%) and the Green Party (5.6%).

The age distribution in Schongau is; 253 people or 29.7% of the population is 0–19 years old. 199 people or 23.4% are 20–39 years old, and 285 people or 33.5% are 40–64 years old. The senior population distribution is 86 people or 10.1% are 65–79 years old, 28 or 3.3% are 80–89 years old and 1 people or 0.1% of the population are 90+ years old.

In Schongau about 64.8% of the population (between age 25-64) have completed either non-mandatory upper secondary education or additional higher education (either university or a Fachhochschule).

As of 2000 there are 242 households, of which 39 households (or about 16.1%) contain only a single individual. 51 or about 21.1% are large households, with at least five members. As of 2000 there were 168 inhabited buildings in the municipality, of which 103 were built only as housing, and 65 were mixed use buildings. There were 70 single family homes, 25 double family homes, and 8 multi-family homes in the municipality. Most homes were either two (60) or three (30) story structures. There were only 8 single story buildings and 5 four or more story buildings.

Schongau has an unemployment rate of 0.77%. As of 2005, there were 170 people employed in the primary economic sector and about 66 businesses involved in this sector. 110 people are employed in the secondary sector and there are 10 businesses in this sector. 63 people are employed in the tertiary sector, with 20 businesses in this sector. As of 2000 49.9% of the population of the municipality were employed in some capacity. At the same time, females made up 37.1% of the workforce.

In the 2000 census the religious membership of Schongau was; 606 (83.1%) were Roman Catholic, and 65 (8.9%) were Protestant, with an additional 9 (1.23%) that were of some other Christian faith. There are 9 individuals (1.23% of the population) who are Muslim. Of the rest; there were 2 (0.27%) individuals who belong to another religion, 21 (2.88%) who do not belong to any organized religion, 17 (2.33%) who did not answer the question.
