= Lieli =

- Former municipality
- Coat of arms
- Location of Lieli
- Location within Switzerland Location within Canton of Lucerne
- Coordinates: 47°12′N 8°18′E
- Country: Switzerland
- Canton: Lucerne
- District: Hochdorf

Area
  - Total: 3.69 km^{2} (1.42 sq mi)
- Elevation: 649 m (2,129 ft)

Population (December 2004)
  - Total: 207
  - Density: 56.1/km^{2} (145/sq mi)
- Time zone: UTC+01:00 (CET)
  - Summer (DST): UTC+02:00 (CEST)
- Postal code: 6277
- SFOS number: 1034
- ISO 3166 code: CH-LU
- Website: Profile (in German), SFSO statistics

Lieli is a village in the canton of Lucerne, Switzerland. The former municipality of the district of Hochdorf merged with Hohenrain on January 1, 2007, to form Hohenrain.

== History ==
Lieli is first mentioned around the year 900 as Lielae. In the local Swiss German dialect, it was known as Nieli as far back as the 17th Century.

== Geography ==
Aerial view (1953)

The village became part of the municipality of Hohenrain in 2007.

== Demographics ==
The historical population is given in the following table:

year	population
1678	258
1798	211
1850	244
1900	193
1950	199
1980	142
