= Lake Baldegg =

Lake in the Canton of Lucerne, Switzerland

- Baldeggersee; Richensee; Heideggersee
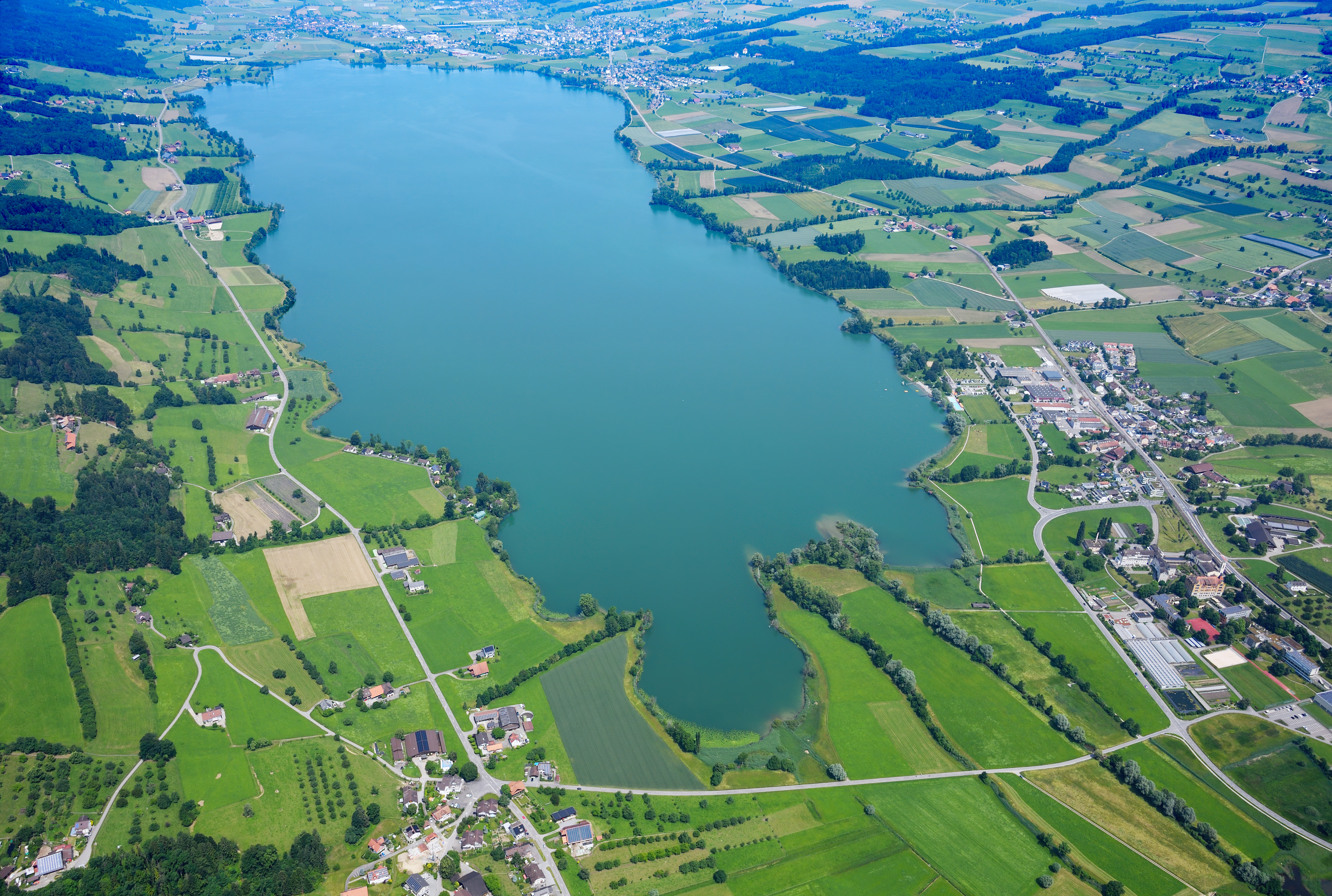
- Aerial view from the south

- Location within Canton of Lucerne Location within Switzerland Location within Alps
- Interactive map of Lake Baldegg
- Location: Canton of Lucerne
- Coordinates: 47°11′55″N 8°15′38″E
- Primary inflows: Ron
- Primary outflows: Aabach
- Catchment area: 73 km^{2} (28 sq mi)
- Basin countries: Switzerland
- Max. length: 4.5 km (2.8 mi)
- Max. width: 1.7 km (1.1 mi)
- Surface area: 5.2 km^{2} (2.0 sq mi)
- Average depth: 33 m (108 ft)
- Max. depth: 66 m (217 ft)
- Water volume: 0.173 km^{3} (140,000 acre⋅ft)
- Residence time: 4.2 years
- Surface elevation: 463 m (1,519 ft)
- Settlements: Gelfingen, Nunwil, Baldegg, Retschwil

Lake Baldegg (German: Baldeggersee) is a lake in the Canton of Lucerne, Switzerland. Its area is about 5.2 km^{2} and its maximum depth is 66 m.

== See also ==
- List of lakes of Switzerland
