= Hochdorf District =

Coordinates: 47°10′N 8°17′E

Hochdorf District Wahlkreis Hochdorf
- District
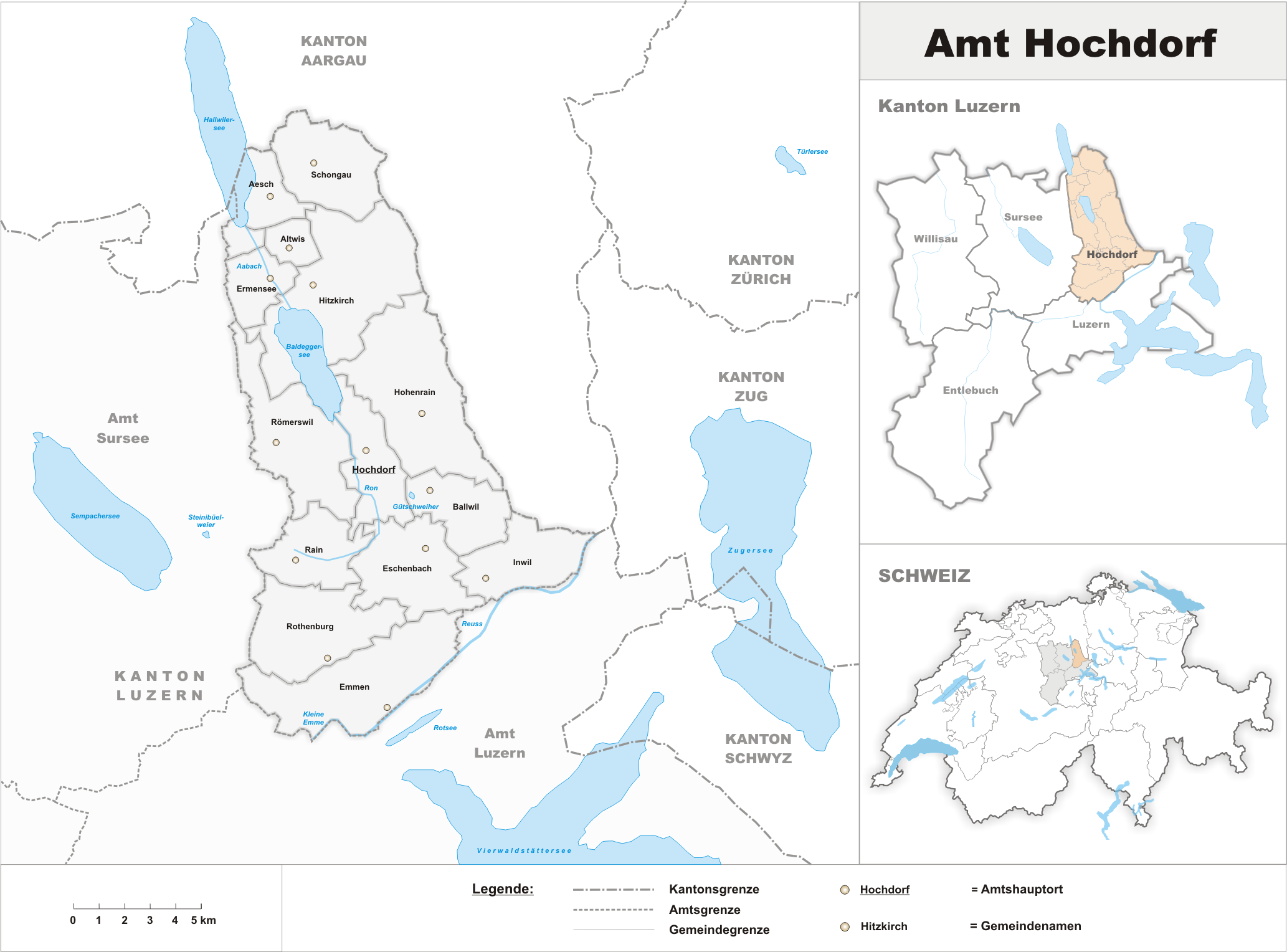
- Country: Switzerland
- Canton: Luzern
- Capital: Hochdorf

Area
  - Total: 183.95 km^{2} (71.02 sq mi)

Population (2020)
  - Total: 74,143
  - Density: 403.06/km^{2} (1,043.9/sq mi)
- Time zone: UTC+1 (CET)
  - Summer (DST): UTC+2 (CEST)
- Municipalities: 13

Hochdorf District was one of the five Ämtern, or districts, of the German-speaking Canton of Lucerne, Switzerland. Its capital is the town of Hochdorf. It has a population of 74,143 (as of 31 December 2020). In 2013 the name was changed from Amt Hochdorf to Wahlkreis Hochdorf as part of a reorganization of the Canton. A sixth Wahlkreis was created, but in Hochdorf everything else remained essentially unchanged.

Hochdorf District consists of the following thirteen municipalities:

| Municipality | Population (31 December 2020) | Area, km^{2} |
|---|---|---|
| Aesch | 1,285 | 4.61 |
| Ballwil | 2,679 | 8.77 |
| Emmen | 31,039 | 20.37 |
| Ermensee | 1,029 | 5.69 |
| Eschenbach | 3,677 | 13.21 |
| Hitzkirch | 5,455 | 27.61 |
| Hochdorf | 9,872 | 9.63 |
| Hohenrain | 2,429 | 23.24 |
| Inwil | 2,706 | 10.32 |
| Rain | 2,940 | 9.42 |
| Römerswil | 1,810 | 16.6 |
| Rothenburg | 7,715 | 15.5 |
| Schongau | 1,046 | 12.43 |
| Total | 74,143 | 177.49 |

== Mergers ==
On 1 January 2021 the former municipality of Altwis merged into the municipality of Hitzkirch.
