= Seengen =

- Municipality
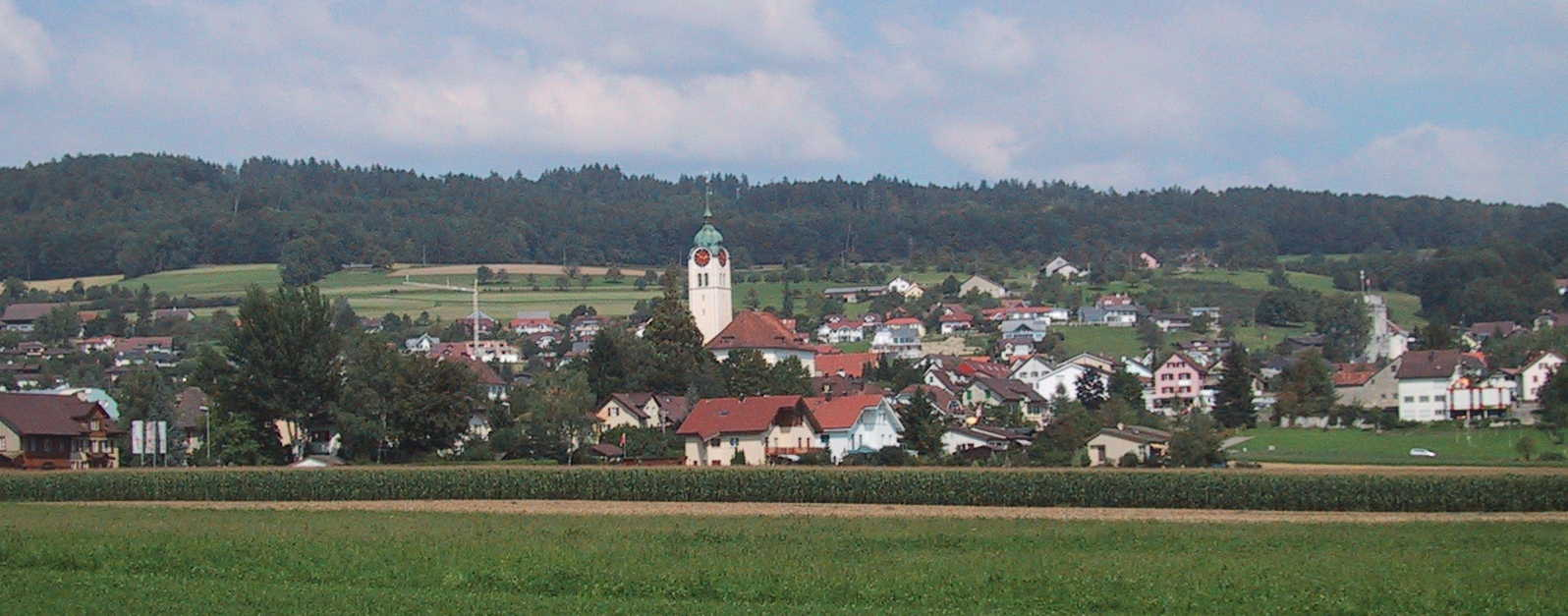

- Flag Coat of arms
- Location of Seengen
- Location within Switzerland Location within Canton of Aargau
- Coordinates: 47°20′N 8°13′E
- Country: Switzerland
- Canton: Aargau
- District: Lenzburg

Area
  - Total: 9.69 km^{2} (3.74 sq mi)
- Elevation: 471 m (1,545 ft)

Population (December 2024)
  - Total: 4,494
  - Density: 464/km^{2} (1,200/sq mi)
- Time zone: UTC+01:00 (CET)
  - Summer (DST): UTC+02:00 (CEST)
- Postal code: 5707
- SFOS number: 4208
- ISO 3166 code: CH-AG
- Surrounded by: Birrwil, Boniswil, Dintikon, Egliswil, Hallwil, Hilfikon, Meisterschwanden, Sarmenstorf, Seon, Villmergen
- Website: www.seengen.ch

Seengen is a municipality in the district of Lenzburg in the canton of Aargau in Switzerland. It belongs to the district of Lenzburg and is located in the Seetal valley at the northern end of Lake Hallwil.

== Toponymy ==
The name Seengen is of Alemannic origin and was formerly known as See-ingen: "Among the settlers by the lake (shore)”. The oldest document mentioning the village is a Fraumünsterrodel of Zürich from 893 (Fraumünster is the famous abbey/church in Zürich and rodel is medieval German for a register, roll, or list). These writings refer to a farmer named Ernus who ran a farm in Seynga together with several partners and had to pay an annual tax to the Fraumünster.

== Geography ==
The center of this village is located about one kilometer from the lake shore on the eastern edge of the Seetal valley at an altitude of 471 meters above sea level.

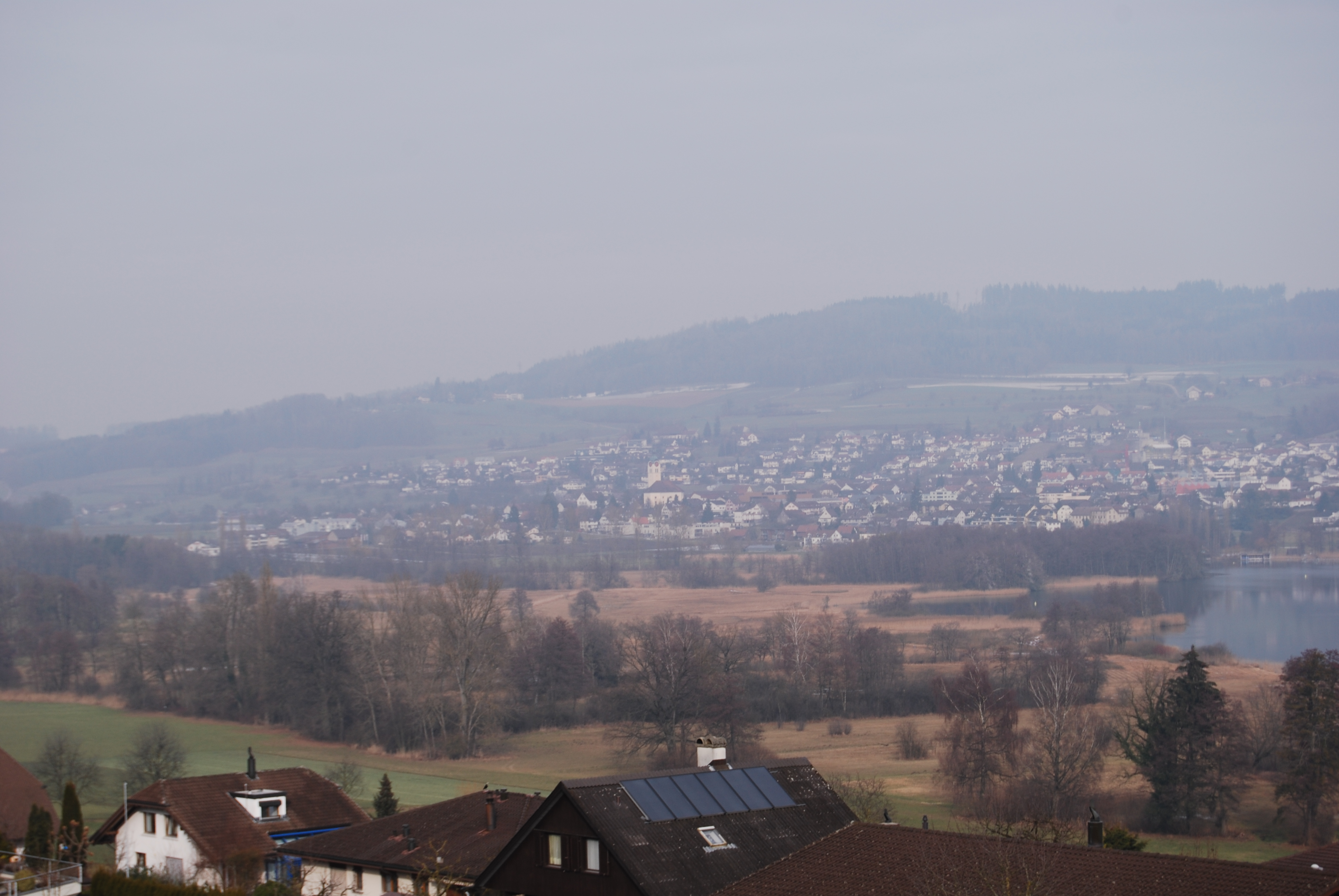
Seengen and Lake Hallwil, seen from the village entry of Boniswil

To the west, part of the plain along the Aabach stream belongs to the municipal area. The municipal boundary partly follows the stream ditch and runs to the left of the stream at the Hallwyl Castle, up the rising terrain to the village of Boniswil.

Aerial view (1952)

The hilly landscape to the right of the Aabach in the northwest of the municipal area is partly covered by forest and features wetlands. This wooded area is a cantonal natural forest reserve, and covers an area of 56 hectares known as the Schlattwald oak forest reserve.

The flat landscape around the Aabach stream was formed over thousands of years by the silting up of the old lake shore and is now a nature reserve. The reed beds and riparian forests are a protected area of national importance. They are part of the Boniswiler-Seenger Ried nature reserve, which is designated as a flat moorland and an amphibian spawning area of national importance. The area is also part of the Emerald network and the Hallwilersee landscape conservation area, which is included in the Federal Inventory of Landscapes and Natural Monuments.

In the southeast, the steep slope of the meadow, south of Brestenberg Castle, drops directly down to the lake shore. The slope is covered with vineyards, some of which have been abandoned for the construction of vacation homes.

To the east and north of the municipality rise the hills of the 712-meter-high Eichberg, which is part of the Rietenberg chain and forms the natural border with the valley of Bünz stream to the east. The upper section of the hills is wooded. Just below the highest point lies a large boulder, called the Titistein, a testament to the early glaciation of the Seetal valley during the Ice Age and one of the largest boulders of the Reuss glacier in the canton of Aargau.

Numerous streams flow down from the mountainous region into the Seetal valley. The village stream in Seengen, which flows into the Aabach near Hallwyl Castle, powers a hammer mill built in 1837, which is still in working order today.

The municipality has an area, as of 2009, of 9.69 square kilometers (3.74 sq mi). Of this area, 4.97 km^{2} (1.92 sq mi) or 51.3% is used for agricultural purposes, while 3.13 km^{2} (1.21 sq mi) or 32.3% is forested. Of the rest of the land, 1.33 km^{2} (0.51 sq mi) or 13.7% is settled (buildings or roads), 0.01 km^{2} (2.5 acres) or 0.1% is either rivers or lakes and 0.18 km^{2} (0.069 sq mi) or 1.9% is unproductive land.

Of the built up area, housing and buildings made up 9.3% and transportation infrastructure made up 2.6%. Out of the forested land, all of the forested land area is covered with heavy forests. Of the agricultural land, 35.6% is used for growing crops and 11.4% is pastures, while 4.3% is used for orchards or vine crops. All the water in the municipality is in rivers and streams. Of the unproductive areas, 1.7% is unproductive vegetation.

The highest point (712 metres above sea level) is on the Eichberg, while the lowest point is 441 metres above sea level on the banks of the Aabach river at the tripoint with Hallwil and Seon.

== History ==
In the Neolithic period, around 5,000 years ago, people lived on the shores of Lake Hallwil. Evidence of this was found at the Seengen–Riesi lakeside settlement excavation in September 1923, and at the Meisterschwanden–Erlenhölzli and Beinwil am See–Ägelmoos sites.

In the Seengen-Riesi moorland reserve, there was a lakeside settlement in the Late Bronze Age, from around the 11th to the 9th century BC. The structures are known as pile dwellings and have been a UNESCO World Heritage Site since 2011 as part of the Prehistoric Pile Dwellings around the Alps.

During the Roman Empire, there were three estates in the municipality of Seengen. One was located near the present-day church and was inhabited in the 1st and 2nd centuries, as evidenced by finds of terra sigillata, brick stamps and mosaic fragments. The other two estates (from the 2nd and 3rd centuries) were located right next to each other. During emergency excavations in Seengen in 2021, the Aargau Cantonal Archaeology Department discovered a Roman road and the oldest settlement site in the canton.

== Coat of arms ==

The blazon of the municipal coat of arms is Argent an Eagle displayed Sable beaked, langued and membered Gules.

== Heritage sites of national significance ==
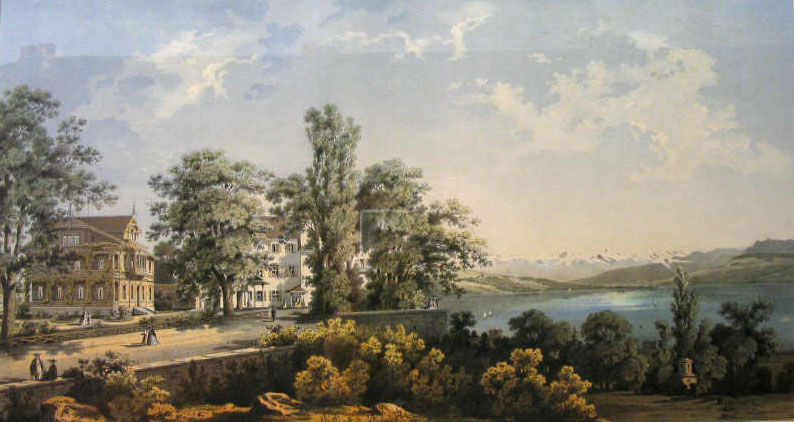
Brestenberg castle

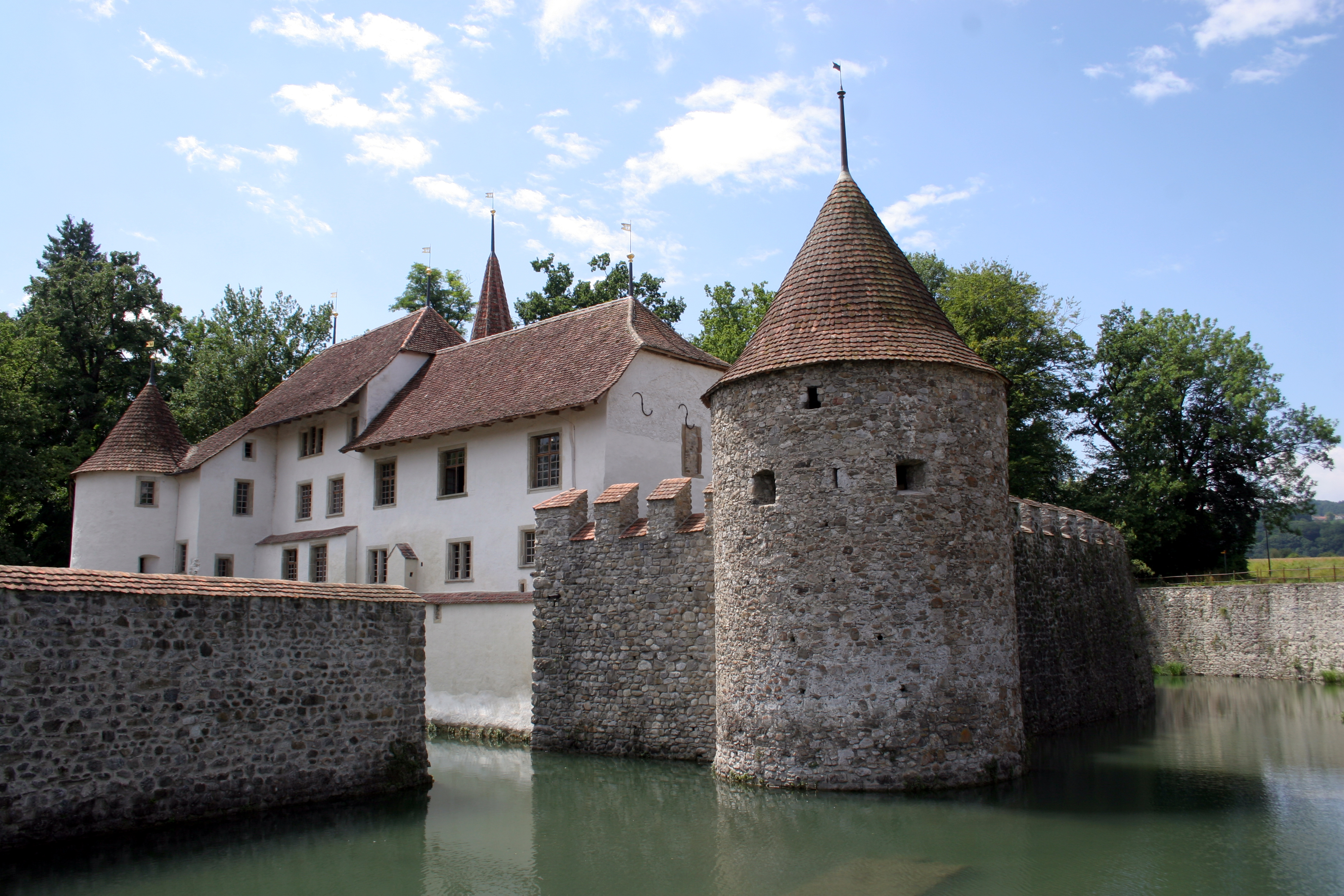
Hallwyl castle

Seengen is home to one or more prehistoric pile-dwelling (or stilt house) settlements that are part of the Prehistoric Pile dwellings around the Alps UNESCO World Heritage Site.

There are four sites that are listed as a Swiss heritage site of national significance. These sites include two castles, Brestenberg Castle and Hallwyl Castle as well as the castle mill and on the shores of Lake Hallwil, the late-Bronze Age village at Risi.

== Places of interest ==
The old late Gothic Church of Seengen, which had been reconsecrated in 1496, became increasingly dilapidated over time and was demolished in 1825. As a replacement, a new building was constructed in 1820/21 in the late classicist style. The master builder was Kopp from Beromünster, who at the same time built an almost identical church in Meisterschwanden. The interior is oval, while the outer walls form an elongated octagon. The parsonage was built in 1742. The former Untervogtei (sub-bailiff's residence) on Kreuzgasse was built around 1440 on behalf of Rudolf IV of Hallwyl as a residential tower. In 1578, using the older walls, it was completely rebuilt into a stepped-gable house in the late Gothic style.

In the upper village stands the Alte Schmitte (Old Smithy), built in 1774. It was acquired and renovated by the municipality in 1990; today it serves as a museum for temporary exhibitions on regional themes.

== Politics and Law ==
The assembly of eligible voters, the town meeting, exercises legislative power. The executive authority is the five-member municipal council. It is elected by the people under the majority voting system, and its term of office is four years. The municipal council leads and represents the municipality. In doing so, it implements the resolutions of the municipal assembly and carries out the tasks assigned to it by the canton.

For legal disputes, the district court of Lenzburg has jurisdiction as the first instance. Seengen belongs to the Aargauer justice of peace district XII.

In the 2007 federal election the most popular party was the SVP which received 38.8% of the vote. The next three most popular parties were the FDP (21.7%), the SP (14.5%) and the Green Party (8.1%).

== Economy ==
The village has held market rights since 1763. A livestock, agricultural machinery, and general goods market is held each spring and autumn, although livestock have no longer been offered since the 1980s. In addition, a Christmas market is held annually in Seengen on the first weekend of December.

Viticulture has always been of great importance. South of the village, on the slopes above Lake Hallwil, a vineyard area of 11.1 hectares was planted in 2018.

== Demographics ==
Seengen has a population (as of December 2020) of 4,122. As of June 2009, 8.4% of the population are foreign nationals. Over the last 10 years (1997–2007) the population has changed at a rate of 31.4%. Most of the population (as of 2000) speaks German (93.9%), with French being second most common ( 1.0%) and Albanian being third ( 1.0%).

The age distribution, as of 2008, in Seengen is; 382 children or 11.7% of the population are between 0 and 9 years old and 435 teenagers or 13.3% are between 10 and 19. Of the adult population, 357 people or 10.9% of the population are between 20 and 29 years old. 415 people or 12.7% are between 30 and 39, 610 people or 18.6% are between 40 and 49, and 466 people or 14.2% are between 50 and 59. The senior population distribution is 333 people or 10.2% of the population are between 60 and 69 years old, 161 people or 4.9% are between 70 and 79, there are 107 people or 3.3% who are between 80 and 89, and there are 12 people or 0.4% who are 90 and older.

As of 2000, there were 59 homes with 1 or 2 persons in the household, 420 homes with 3 or 4 persons in the household, and 439 homes with 5 or more persons in the household. As of 2000, there were 952 private households (homes and apartments) in the municipality, and an average of 2.6 persons per household. In 2008 there were 573 single family homes (or 42.7% of the total) out of a total of 1,343 homes and apartments. There were a total of 90 empty apartments for a 6.7% vacancy rate. As of 2007, the construction rate of new housing units was 26 new units per 1000 residents.

The historical population is given in the following table:

Historical population
Year	Pop.	±%
1975	1,608	—
1980	1,631	+1.4%
1990	2,066	+26.7%
2000	2,638	+27.7%
2009	3,362	+27.4%

== Economy ==
As of 2007, Seengen had an unemployment rate of 1.2%. As of 2005, there were 105 people employed in the primary economic sector and about 28 businesses involved in this sector. 202 people are employed in the secondary sector and there are 27 businesses in this sector. 571 people are employed in the tertiary sector, with 88 businesses in this sector.

In 2000 there were 1,304 workers who lived in the municipality. Of these, 899 or about 68.9% of the residents worked outside Seengen while 421 people commuted into the municipality for work. There were a total of 826 jobs (of at least 6 hours per week) in the municipality. Of the working population, 10.2% used public transportation to get to work, and 52.1% used a private car.

== Religion ==
From the 2000 census, 500 or 19.8% were Roman Catholic, while 1,578 or 62.5% belonged to the Swiss Reformed Church. Of the rest of the population, there were 4 individuals (or about 0.16% of the population) who belonged to the Christian Catholic faith.

== Education ==
In Seengen about 80.3% of the population (between age 25-64) have completed either non-mandatory upper secondary education or additional higher education (either university or a Fachhochschule). Of the school age population (in the 2008/2009 school year), there are 286 students attending primary school, there are 218 students attending secondary school, there are 191 students attending tertiary or university level schooling in the municipality. Seengen is home to the Schul und Gemeinde Bibliothek Seengen (school and municipal library of Seengen). The library has (as of 2008) 8,758 books or other media, and loaned out 34,413 items in the same year. It was open a total of 250 days with average of 11 hours per week during that year.

== Personalities linked to the town ==
- Margrit Rainer: Swiss comedian, radio personality, and stage and film actress. Citizen of Seengen.
- Ruedi Walter: Swiss comedian, actor and radio personality. Citizen of Seengen
- Cédric Hächler: Ice hockey player. Born in Seengen.
- Johann Ribi von Lenzburg: Bischop. Born in Seengen.
- Johann Ludwig Nüscheler: Swiss Reformed pastor and antistes of the Zürich Church. Born in Seengen.
- Max Alphonse Erismann: Politician, member of Swiss National Council. Born in Seengen.
