= Boniswiler-Seenger Ried nature reserve =

The Boniswiler-Seenger Ried nature reserve is a natural landscape on the shores of Lake Hallwil in the Swiss canton of Aargau and a protected area of national importance. This large wetland is listed as a particularly valuable habitat in both the Federal Inventory of Flat Moors of National Importance and the Federal Inventory of Amphibian Spawning Sites of National Importance, and is also protected as a site in the Emerald network under the Bern Convention.

The area forms a valuable part of the Lake Hallwil landscape conservation area, which is included in the Federal Inventory of Landscapes and Natural Monuments.
