= Seetal (disambiguation) =

The Seetal valley is a valley in central Switzerland.

Seetal may also refer to:

- The Seetal railway line in central Switzerland
- The SEETAL art show and competition held in Meisterschwanden, Switzerland
