= Salomon David Steinberg =

Swiss expressionist writer

- Born: June 25, 1889; Lucerne, Switzerland
- Died: October 22, 1965 (aged 76); Zurich, Switzerland
- Occupations: Writer, editor, school director
- Spouse: Lea Jacobson (m. 1914)
- Relatives: Augusta Weldler (sister)
- Writing career
- Period: 1914–1965
- Genre: Expressionist poetry
- Notable works: Untergang (1917); Klingendes Erleben (1927)

Salomon David Steinberg (25 June 1889 – 22 October 1965) was a Swiss writer and editor, recognized as one of the few expressionist writers in Switzerland. He was also the cultural editor of the Zürcher Post and later director of the Institut Minerva in Zurich.

== Early life and education ==
Steinberg was born on 25 June 1889 in Lucerne to Wilhelm Wolf Steinberg, a merchant, and Adele Mieses. He was of Jewish faith and originally from Hallwil. His sister was Augusta Weldler. He studied history, German literature, and philosophy in Berlin and Zurich, earning his doctorate at the University of Zurich in 1913 under Gerold Meyer von Knonau.

== Career ==
Steinberg married Lea Jacobson of Dvinsk (Russia, now Daugavpils, Latvia), daughter of Chaim, a merchant, in 1914. That same year, he began working as an editor for the cultural section of the Zürcher Post, a position he held until 1921. During his time as editor, Steinberg helped promote the work of Kurt Guggenheim and maintained contacts with prominent literary figures including Else Lasker-Schüler, Rainer Maria Rilke, and Stefan Zweig.

From 1921 to 1925, Steinberg worked as an independent writer in Berlin. In 1925, he returned to Zurich to become director of the Institut Minerva, a position he held for the remainder of his career.

== Literary work ==
Steinberg was among the rare expressionist writers in Switzerland. He published several collections of poetry, including Untergang (Downfall) in 1917 and Klingendes Erleben (Resonant Experience) in 1927.

== Legacy ==
After Steinberg's death in Zurich on 22 October 1965, his wife Lea established the Salomon David Steinberg Foundation in 1969. The foundation awards scholarships to doctoral students in the humanities.
