= Meisterschwanden–Erlenhölzli =

Archaeological site in Aargau, Switzerland

Meisterschwanden–Erlenhölzli refers to an archaeological site in Meisterschwanden in the Swiss canton of Aargau. It is located approximately 80 metres from the shore of Lake Hallwil. It is a lakeside settlement (also known as a pile dwelling village or palafitte) from the Neolithic period (4th to 3rd millennium BC). The site is not designated as a World Heritage Site, but is recognised and protected as an associated site of the UNESCO World Heritage Site Prehistoric Pile Dwellings around the Alps.
