= Ermensee =

- Municipality
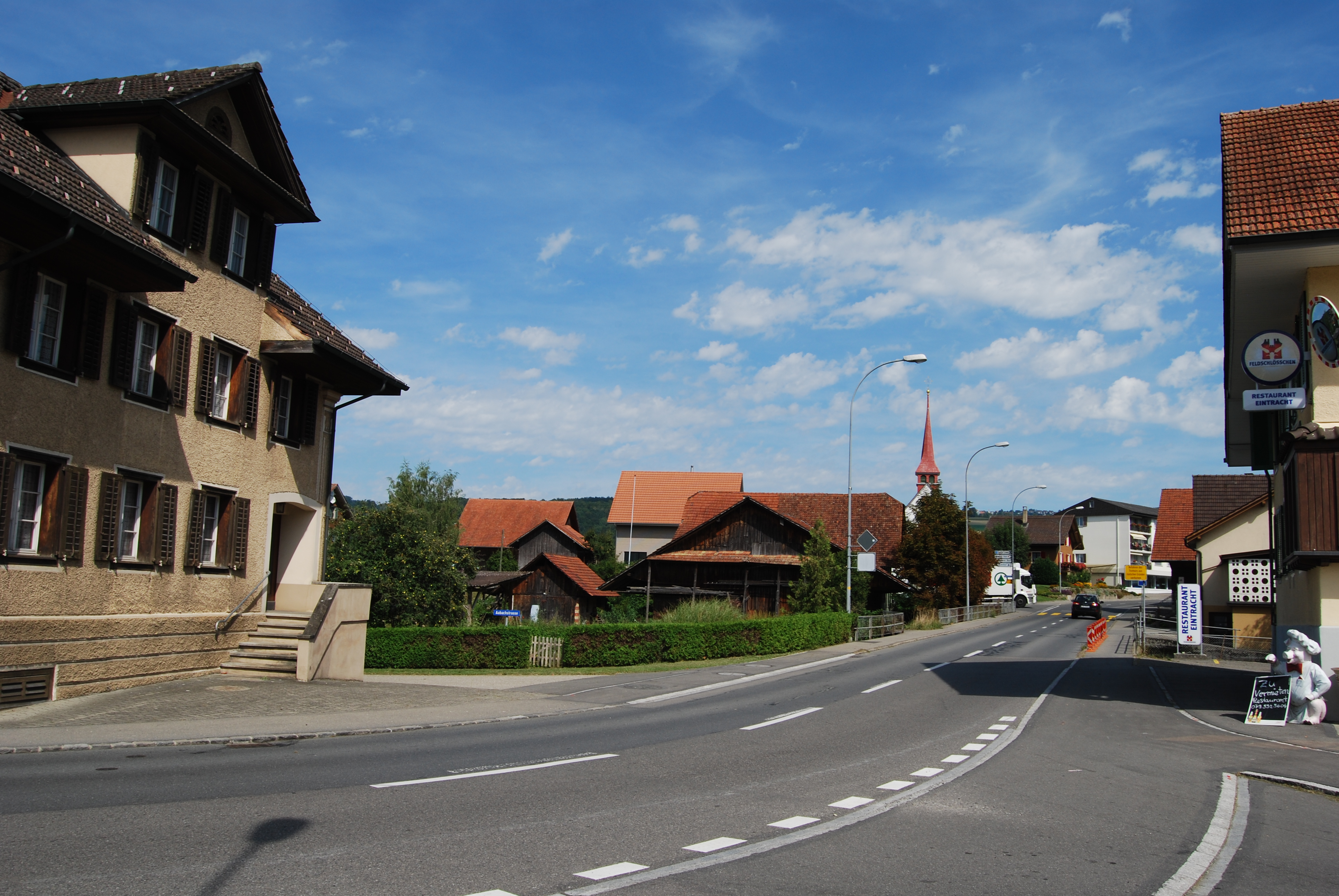

- Coat of arms
- Location of Ermensee
- Location within Switzerland Location within Canton of Lucerne
- Coordinates: 47°14′N 8°14′E
- Country: Switzerland
- Canton: Lucerne
- District: Hochdorf

Area
  - Total: 5.70 km^{2} (2.20 sq mi)
- Elevation: 462 m (1,516 ft)

Population (December 2020)
  - Total: 1,029
  - Density: 181/km^{2} (468/sq mi)
- Time zone: UTC+01:00 (CET)
  - Summer (DST): UTC+02:00 (CEST)
- Postal code: 6294
- SFOS number: 1025
- ISO 3166 code: CH-LU
- Surrounded by: Altwis, Beromünster, Gunzwil, Hitzkirch, Mosen, Römerswil
- Website: www.ermensee.ch

Ermensee is a municipality in the district of Hochdorf in the canton of Lucerne in Switzerland.

== History ==
Ermensee is first mentioned in 1036 as Armense.

== Geography ==
Aerial view (1952)

Ermensee is located in the Seetal valley between Lake Hallwil and Lake Baldegg. It is on the road between Lenzburg and Emmenbrücke.

The municipality has an area of 5.7 km^{2} (2.2 sq mi). Of this area, 58.9% is used for agricultural purposes, while 35.3% is forested. Of the rest of the land, 5.4% is settled (buildings or roads) and the remainder (0.4%) is non-productive (rivers, glaciers or mountains). In the 1997 land survey, 35.26% of the total land area was forested. Of the agricultural land, 53.51% is used for farming or pastures, while 5.44% is used for orchards or vine crops. Of the settled areas, 2.46% is covered with buildings, 0.53% is industrial, 0.35% is classed as special developments, 0.35% is parks or greenbelts and 1.75% is transportation infrastructure. Of the unproductive areas, it is all unproductive flowing water (rivers).

== Demographics ==
Ermensee has a population (as of 31 December 2020) of 1,029. As of 2007, 6.8% of the population was made up of foreign nationals. Over the last 10 years the population has decreased at a rate of -0.5%. Most of the population (as of 2000) speaks German (96.1%), with Albanian being second most common (1.7%) and Serbo-Croatian being third (0.7%).

In the 2007 election the most popular party was the FDP which received 35.4% of the vote. The next three most popular parties were the CVP (28.3%), the SVP (27.7%) and the Green Party (4.3%).

The age distribution in Ermensee is; 212 people or 25.7% of the population is 0–19 years old. 224 people or 27.2% are 20–39 years old, and 311 people or 37.7% are 40–64 years old. The senior population distribution is 59 people or 7.2% are 65–79 years old, 15 or 1.8% are 80–89 years old and 4 people or 0.5% of the population are 90+ years old.

The entire Swiss population is generally well educated. In Ermensee about 71.3% of the population (between age 25-64) have completed either non-mandatory upper secondary education or additional higher education (either university or a Fachhochschule).

As of 2000 there are 249 households, of which 59 households (or about 23.7%) contain only a single individual. 45 or about 18.1% are large households, with at least five members. As of 2000 there were 171 inhabited buildings in the municipality, of which 129 were built only as housing, and 42 were mixed use buildings. There were 91 single family homes, 29 double family homes, and 9 multi-family homes in the municipality. Most homes were either two (91) or three (28) story structures. There were only 6 single story buildings and 4 four or more story buildings.

Ermensee has an unemployment rate of 1.4%. As of 2005, there were 72 people employed in the primary economic sector and about 20 businesses involved in this sector. 109 people are employed in the secondary sector and there are 17 businesses in this sector. 82 people are employed in the tertiary sector, with 22 businesses in this sector. As of 2000 52.5% of the population of the municipality were employed in some capacity. At the same time, females made up 41.6% of the workforce.

In the 2000 census the religious membership of Ermensee was; 633 (84.9%) were Roman Catholic, and 64 (8.6%) were Protestant, with an additional 8 (1.07%) that were of some other Christian faith. There are 7 individuals (0.94% of the population) who are Muslim. Of the rest; there were 18 (2.41%) who do not belong to any organized religion, 16 (2.14%) who did not answer the question.

The historical population is given in the following table:

year	population
1678	411
1798	566
1850	709
1900	571
1950	619
2000	746
