= Augusta Weldler-Steinberg =

Swiss-Jewish historian and journalist

- Born: Augusta Steinberg; 1 November 1879; Pomorzany, Galicia, Austria-Hungary (now Ukraine)
- Died: 10 November 1932 (aged 53); Zurich, Switzerland
- Occupations: Historian, journalist, educator
- Spouse: Norbert Weldler (m. 1909)
- Relatives: Salomon David Steinberg (brother)

Augusta Weldler-Steinberg (1 November 1879 – 10 November 1932) was a Swiss-Jewish historian, journalist, and educator. She is best known for her pioneering work on the history of Jews in Switzerland, becoming the first person to present a comprehensive study of the subject from the Middle Ages through the modern era.

== Early life and education ==
Augusta Steinberg was born on 1 November 1879 in Pomorzany, Galicia, Austria-Hungary (now Ukraine), the daughter of Wilhelm Wolf Steinberg, a merchant, and Adele Mieses. She was the sister of Salomon David Steinberg.

She spent her youth in Endingen and Lucerne, where she obtained her teaching certificate, becoming the first Jewish woman to receive a teacher's qualification in Lucerne. She subsequently studied history, philosophy, and German literature at the University of Bern, earning her doctorate in 1902 with the first comprehensive presentation of the history of Jews in Switzerland during the Middle Ages.

== Career ==
In 1904, Weldler-Steinberg moved to Zurich, where she taught languages to Jewish immigrants from Eastern Europe. She later relocated to Berlin, where she edited works by German poets such as Theodor Körner and the Jewish writer Rahel Varnhagen.

Returning to Zurich, she directed the Jewish press agency from 1919 onward. In 1922, she was commissioned to write a history of Jews in Switzerland in the modern era. She worked on this project alongside her journalistic activities until her death, producing a manuscript that the Swiss Federation of Jewish Communities declined to publish for political reasons. The work was eventually published in two volumes in 1966 and 1970, and it became a standard reference work on the political history of Jews in Switzerland.

An active Zionist, Weldler-Steinberg directed the youth sector of the Federation of Swiss Zionists.

== Personal life ==
In 1909, she married Norbert Weldler. She received Swiss citizenship from Hallwil in 1899.

== Death ==
Weldler-Steinberg died on 10 November 1932 in Zurich.

== Selected works ==
- Intérieurs aus dem Leben der Zürcher Juden im 14. und 15. Jahrhundert (1959)
