= Brestenberg Castle =

Castle in Seengen, Switzerland

- Seengen
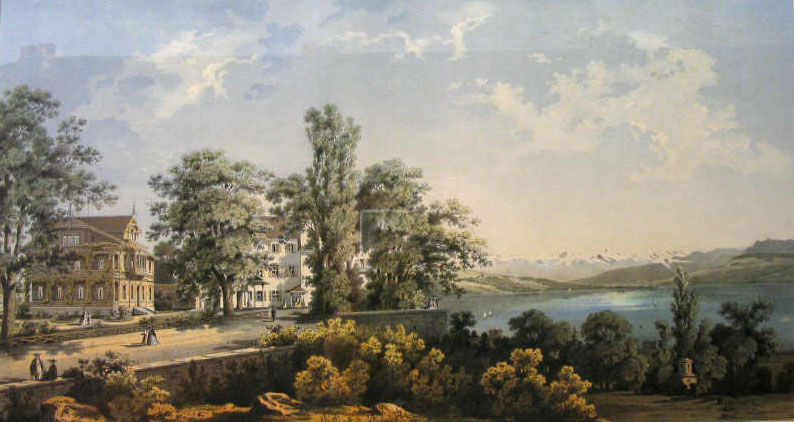
- Castle and Spa Brestenberg by Seengen on the Hallwilersee. Colored lithograph by J.August Aujourd'hui, 1865.

Site information
- Code: CH-AG
- Condition: preserved

Location
- Location within Switzerland
- Coordinates: 47°19′11.50″N 8°12′29.52″E

Site history
- Built: 1625

Brestenberg Castle (German: Schloss Brestenberg) is a three-story, late Gothic to early Baroque manor house located in the municipality of Seengen, in the canton of Aargau, Switzerland. It was built in 1625 by Hans Rudolf von Hallwil and remains adorned with his coat of arms on its southern façade. The property is listed as a cultural heritage site of national significance and has been under cantonal protection since 1946.

The building has a rectangular plan and a hipped roof, and retains stylistic features from the late Gothic and early Baroque periods. Architectural features include continuous stone window bands, carved volutes, and a timber roof constructed without interior supports. Interior features include a round-arched door with Gothic framing and an 18th-century stucco ceiling.

== History ==
Brestenberg Castle was built in 1625 by Hans Rudolf von Hallwil and was later inherited or acquired by several prominent local families. In 1844, it was converted into a hydrotherapy clinic by Dr. Adolf Erismann, a military physician during the Sonderbund War. Baths and a garden hall were constructed as part of the spa facilities during this period. Cosima Wagner, wife of composer Richard Wagner, reportedly stayed at the clinic in 1858.

The castle later operated as a hotel and spa with access to a private beach on Lake Hallwil. After closing in the early 1980s due to lack of investment, it fell into disrepair. In 1984, it was acquired by art collector Bruno Stefanini, who built an underground storage facility beneath the castle for his foundation’s collection. The castle itself remained unused.

After Stefanini’s death in 2018, ownership of the property and its underground storage halls passed to his foundation, the Stiftung für Kunst, Kultur und Geschichte.

== See also ==
- List of castles and fortresses in Switzerland
