= Boniswil =

- Municipality
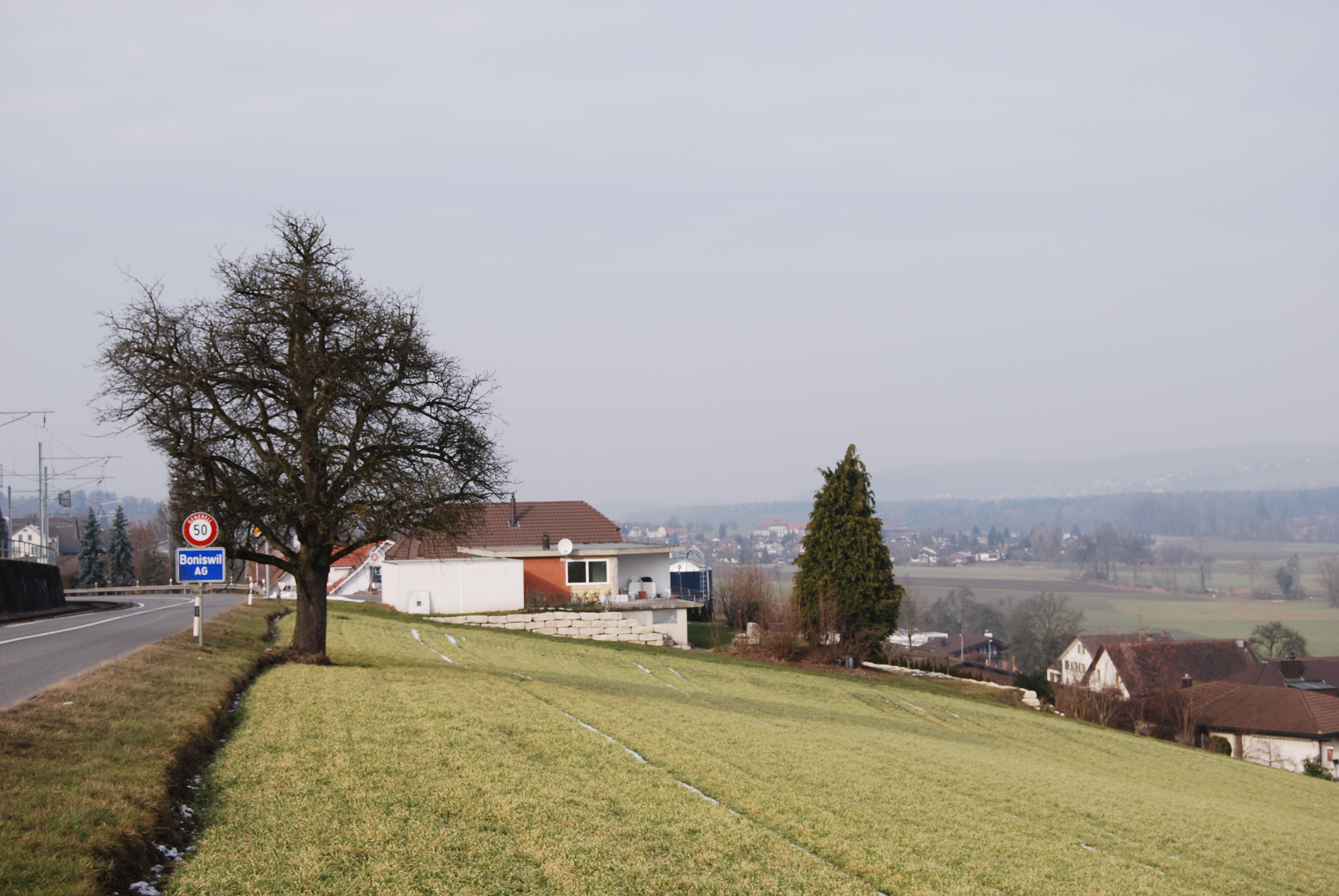

- Flag Coat of arms
- Location of Boniswil
- Location within Switzerland Location within Canton of Aargau
- Coordinates: 47°19′N 8°11′E
- Country: Switzerland
- Canton: Aargau
- District: Lenzburg

Area
  - Total: 2.41 km^{2} (0.93 sq mi)
- Elevation: 477 m (1,565 ft)

Population (December 2020)
  - Total: 1,520
  - Density: 631/km^{2} (1,630/sq mi)
- Time zone: UTC+01:00 (CET)
  - Summer (DST): UTC+02:00 (CEST)
- Postal code: 5706
- SFOS number: 4192
- ISO 3166 code: CH-AG
- Surrounded by: Birrwil, Hallwil, Leutwil, Seengen
- Website: www.boniswil.ch

Boniswil is a municipality in the district of Lenzburg in the canton of Aargau in Switzerland.

Aerial view (1962)

== History ==
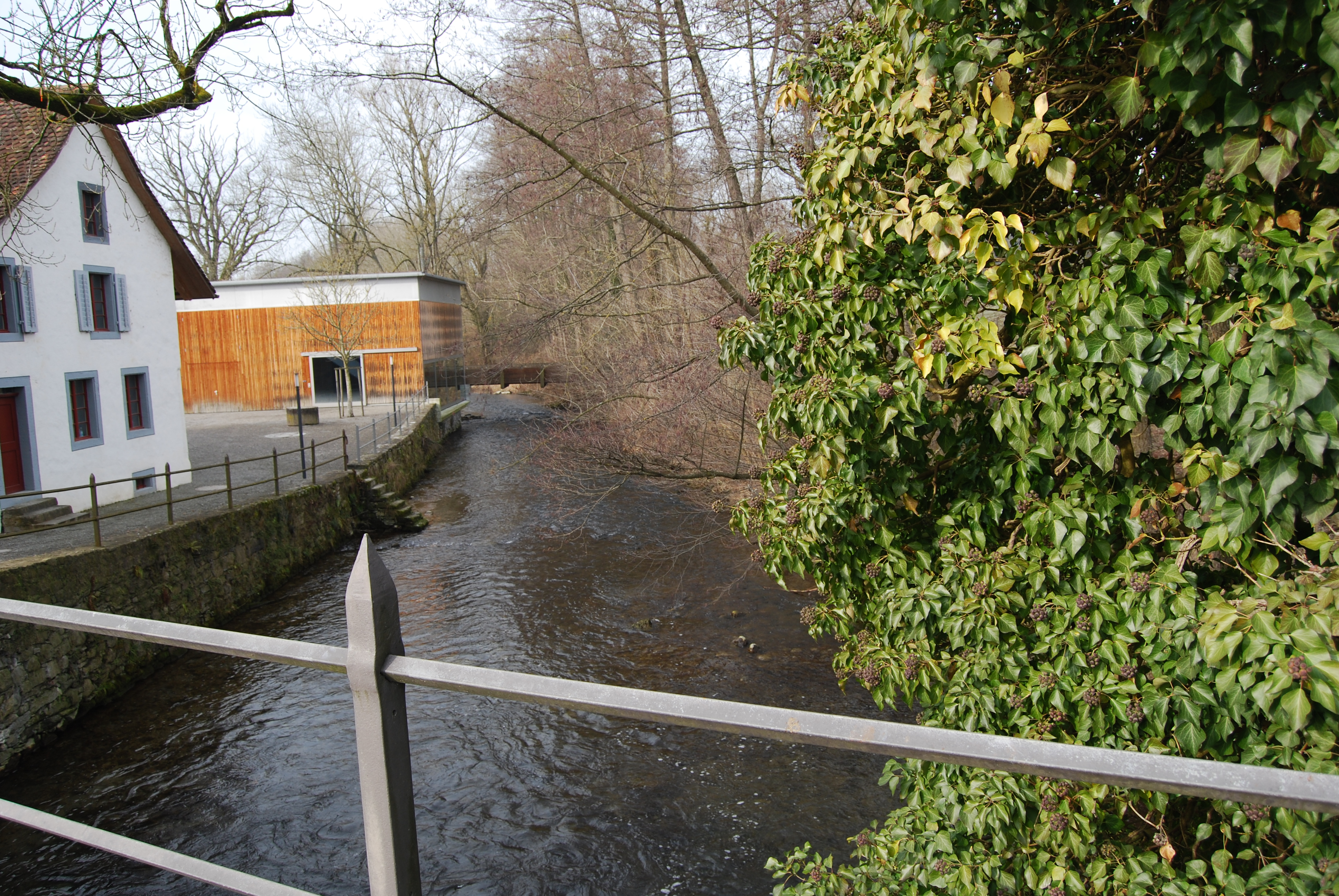
River Aabach in Boniswil

Boniswil is first mentioned around 1217–22 as Bonoltswile. The village was ruled by the Counts of Lenzburg, then the counts of Kyburg and then the Habsburgs and finally in 1415 the city of Bern. The rights to low justice were held by the Habsburg vassals, the lords of Rinach in the 13th century. These rights, in turn, came in 1486 to the possession of the lords of Hallwyl and passed in 1616 to Bern. Einsiedeln Abbey collected rent on about three fifths of the land in the village.

Religiously, it was part of the Seengen parish until 1842 when it joined Leutwil parish.

In the 18th century, the major economic sources in the village were the cotton industry with home spinning and weaving and agriculture. In the 19th century, cotton was replaced by the straw industry. The construction of the Seetalbahn train line in 1883 brought economic recovery and new industries (tobacco, box factories). Since 1950 a number of new buildings were added to the municipality. In 1990 only 6% of the local jobs were in agricultural sector, while about 53% were in services. 73% of the population commutes outside the municipality for work, while 49% of jobs in the municipality are filled by commuters.

== Geography ==
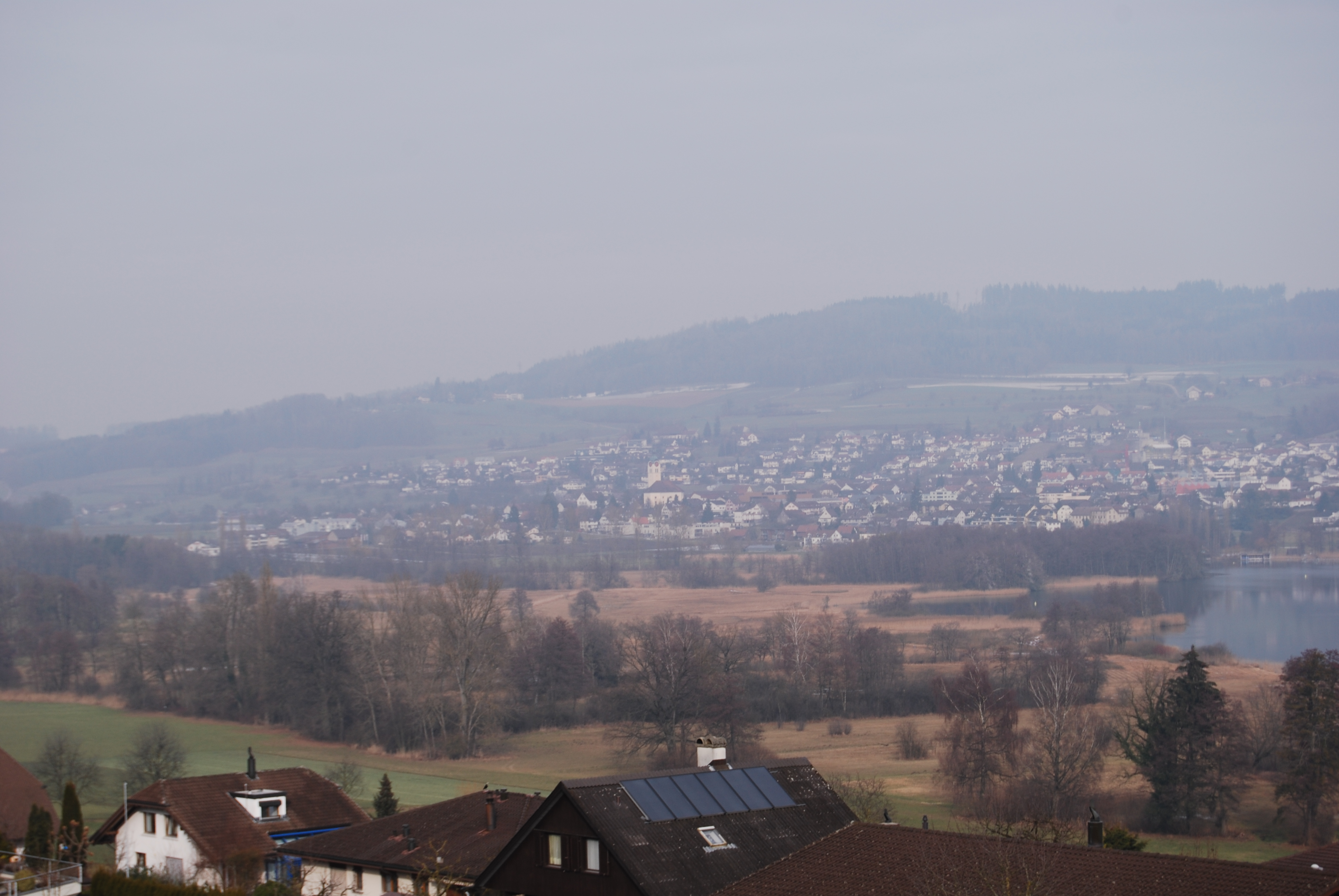
Seengen and Lake Hallwil, from Boniswil

Boniswil is located in the Seetal valley, on the shores of Lake Hallwil, and on the Seetalstrasse.

The municipality consists of the village of Boniswil and the hamlets of Alliswil, which became part of Boniswil in 1898. It has an area, as of 2009, of 2.41 square kilometers (0.93 sq mi). Of this area, 1.38 km^{2} (0.53 sq mi) or 57.3% is used for agricultural purposes, while 0.19 km^{2} (0.073 sq mi) or 7.9% is forested. Of the rest of the land, 0.48 km^{2} (0.19 sq mi) or 19.9% is settled (buildings or roads), 0.01 km^{2} (2.5 acres) or 0.4% is either rivers or lakes and 0.29 km^{2} (0.11 sq mi) or 12.0% is unproductive land.

Of the built up area, housing and buildings made up 15.4% and transportation infrastructure made up 4.1%. Out of the forested land, 6.6% of the total land area is heavily forested and 1.2% is covered with orchards or small clusters of trees. Of the agricultural land, 28.2% is used for growing crops and 21.2% is pastures, while 7.9% is used for orchards or vine crops. All the water in the municipality is in rivers and streams. Of the unproductive areas, 12.0% is unproductive vegetation and .

== Coat of arms ==
The blazon of the municipal coat of arms is Gules a Snipe proper statant on a Mount Vert.

== Demographics ==
Boniswil has a population (as of December 2020) of 1,520 As of June 2009, 14.3% of the population are foreign nationals. Over the last 10 years (1997–2007) the population has changed at a rate of 7.6%. Most of the population (as of 2000) speaks German (92.0%), with Italian being second most common (1.7%) and Albanian being third (1.4%).

The age distribution, as of 2008, in Boniswil is; 136 children or 9.7% of the population are between 0 and 9 years old and 191 teenagers or 13.6% are between 10 and 19. Of the adult population, 156 people or 11.1% of the population are between 20 and 29 years old. 175 people or 12.4% are between 30 and 39, 246 people or 17.5% are between 40 and 49, and 231 people or 16.4% are between 50 and 59. The senior population distribution is 143 people or 10.1% of the population are between 60 and 69 years old, 92 people or 6.5% are between 70 and 79, there are 31 people or 2.2% who are between 80 and 89, and there are 8 people or 0.6% who are 90 and older.

As of 2000 the average number of residents per living room was 0.54 which is about equal to the cantonal average of 0.57 per room. In this case, a room is defined as space of a housing unit of at least 4 m^{2} (43 sq ft) as normal bedrooms, dining rooms, living rooms, kitchens and habitable cellars and attics. About 65.7% of the total households were owner occupied, or in other words did not pay rent (though they may have a mortgage or a rent-to-own agreement).

As of 2000, there were 25 homes with 1 or 2 persons in the household, 220 homes with 3 or 4 persons in the household, and 262 homes with 5 or more persons in the household. As of 2000, there were 520 private households (homes and apartments) in the municipality, and an average of 2.5 persons per household. In 2008 there were 338 single family homes (or 58.0% of the total) out of a total of 583 homes and apartments. There were a total of 2 empty apartments for a 0.3% vacancy rate. As of 2007, the construction rate of new housing units was 4.4 new units per 1000 residents.

In the 2007 federal election the most popular party was the SVP which received 43.5% of the vote. The next three most popular parties were the SP (16.4%), the FDP (16.3%) and the Green Party (7.9%).

The entire Swiss population is generally well educated. In Boniswil about 79% of the population (between age 25 and 64) have completed either non-mandatory upper secondary education or additional higher education (either university or a Fachhochschule). Of the school age population (in the 2008/2009 school year), there are 94 students attending primary school in the municipality.

The historical population is given in the following table:

Historical population
Year	Pop.	±%
1764	253	—
1798	389	+53.8%
1850	695	+78.7%
1900	580	−16.5%
1950	653	+12.6%
2000	1,316	+101.5%

== Economy ==
As of 2007, Boniswil had an unemployment rate of 1.08%. As of 2005, there were 14 people employed in the primary economic sector and about 8 businesses involved in this sector. 122 people are employed in the secondary sector and there are 21 businesses in this sector. 123 people are employed in the tertiary sector, with 42 businesses in this sector.

In 2000 there were 690 workers who lived in the municipality. Of these, 552 or about 80.0% of the residents worked outside Boniswil while 128 people commuted into the municipality for work. There were a total of 266 jobs (of at least 6 hours per week) in the municipality. Of the working population, 10.4% used public transportation to get to work, and 61.5% used a private car.

== Religion ==
From the 2000 census, 301 or 22.9% were Roman Catholic, while 798 or 60.6% belonged to the Swiss Reformed Church. Of the rest of the population, there were 4 individuals (or about 0.30% of the population) who belonged to the Christian Catholic faith.
