= Beinwil am See–Ägelmoos =

Archaeological site in Aargau, Switzerland

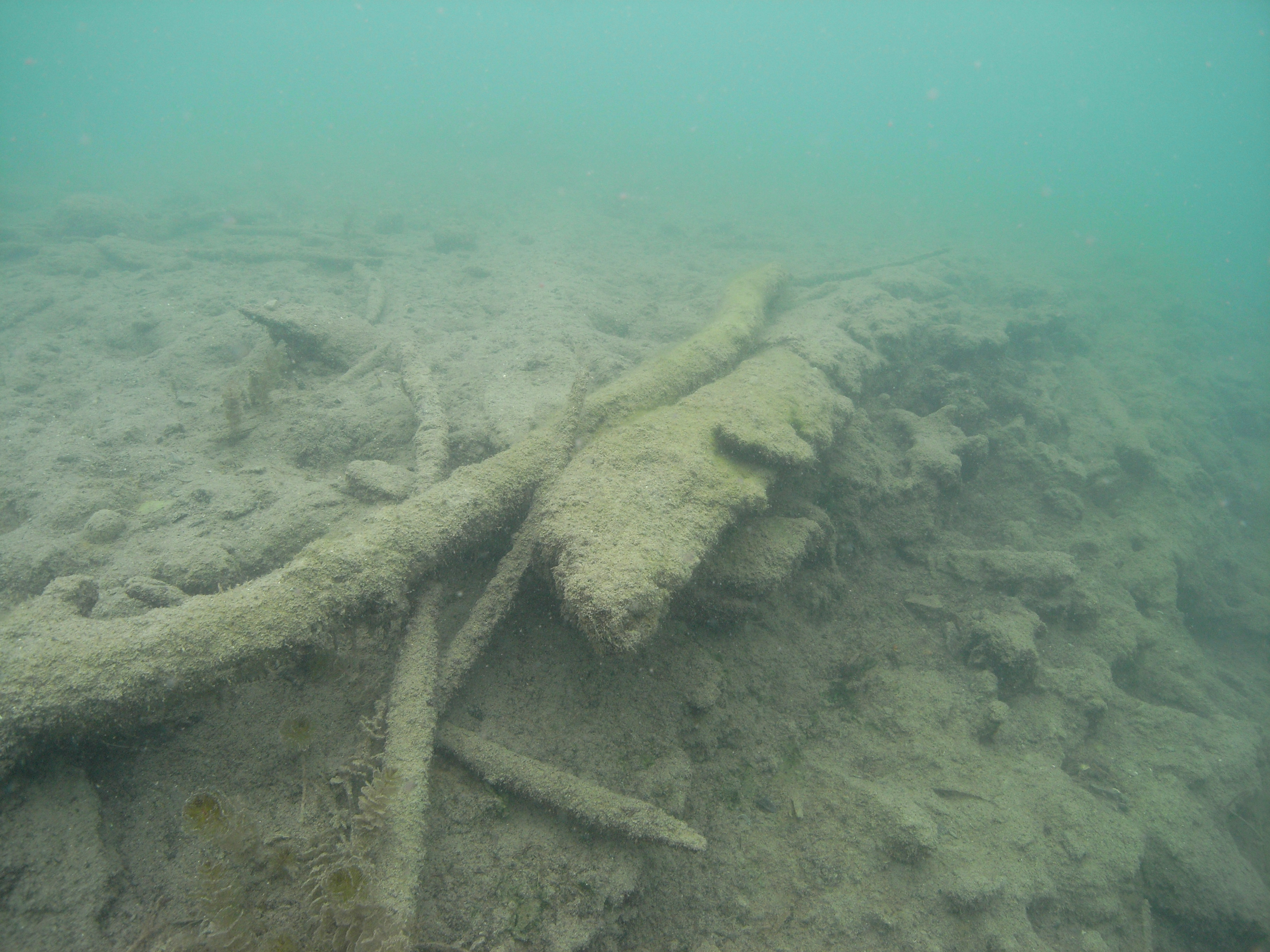

Beinwil am See–Ägelmoos is an archaeological site in Beinwil am See in the Swiss canton of Aargau. It is a lakeside settlement (also known as a pile dwelling village or palafitte) that was probably inhabited during the Neolithic, Early Bronze Age and Late Bronze Age, i.e. between 4500 BC and 850 BC. Today (2019), the remains of the settlement lie completely submerged in Lake Hallwil. As a protective measure, they were covered with a layer of geotextile and gravel in 2017. Since 2011, the site has been part of the UNESCO World Heritage Site Prehistoric Pile Dwellings around the Alps.
