= Seetal =

Valley in the cantons of Lucerne and Aargau in Switzerland

Coordinates: 47°13′54″N 8°14′37″E

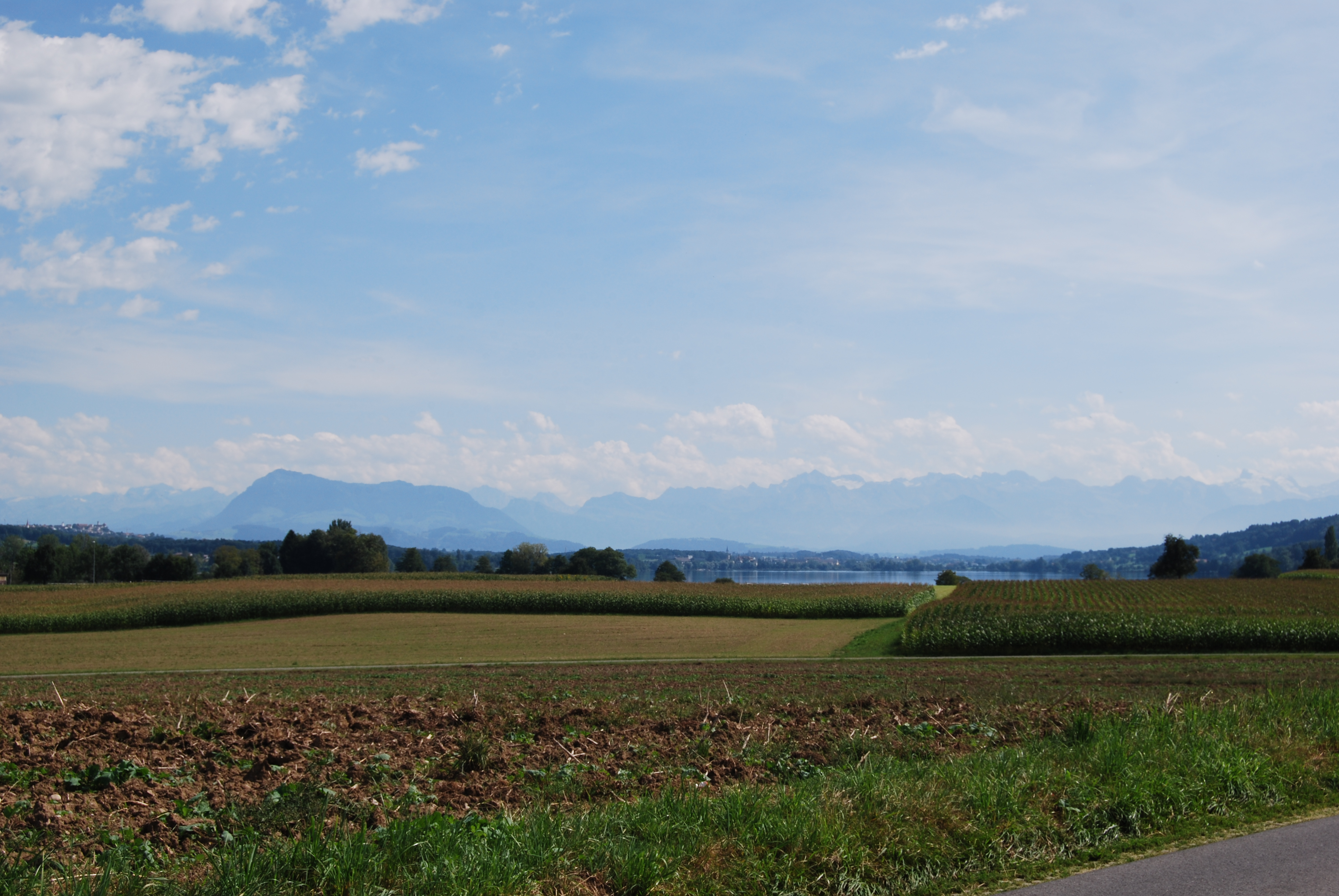
The Seetal valley, with Lake Baldegg in the middle ground and the Alps behind

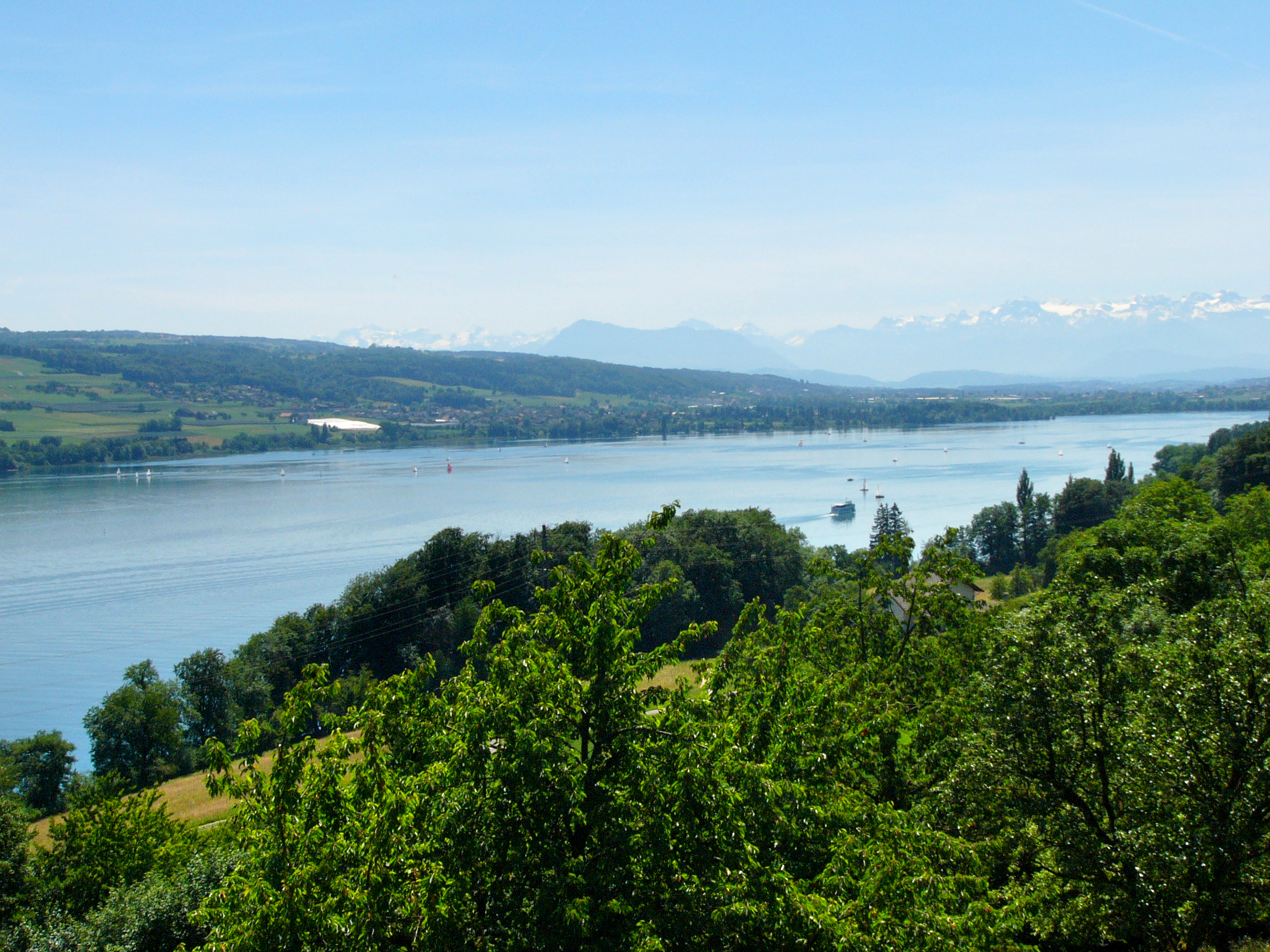
Lake Hallwil

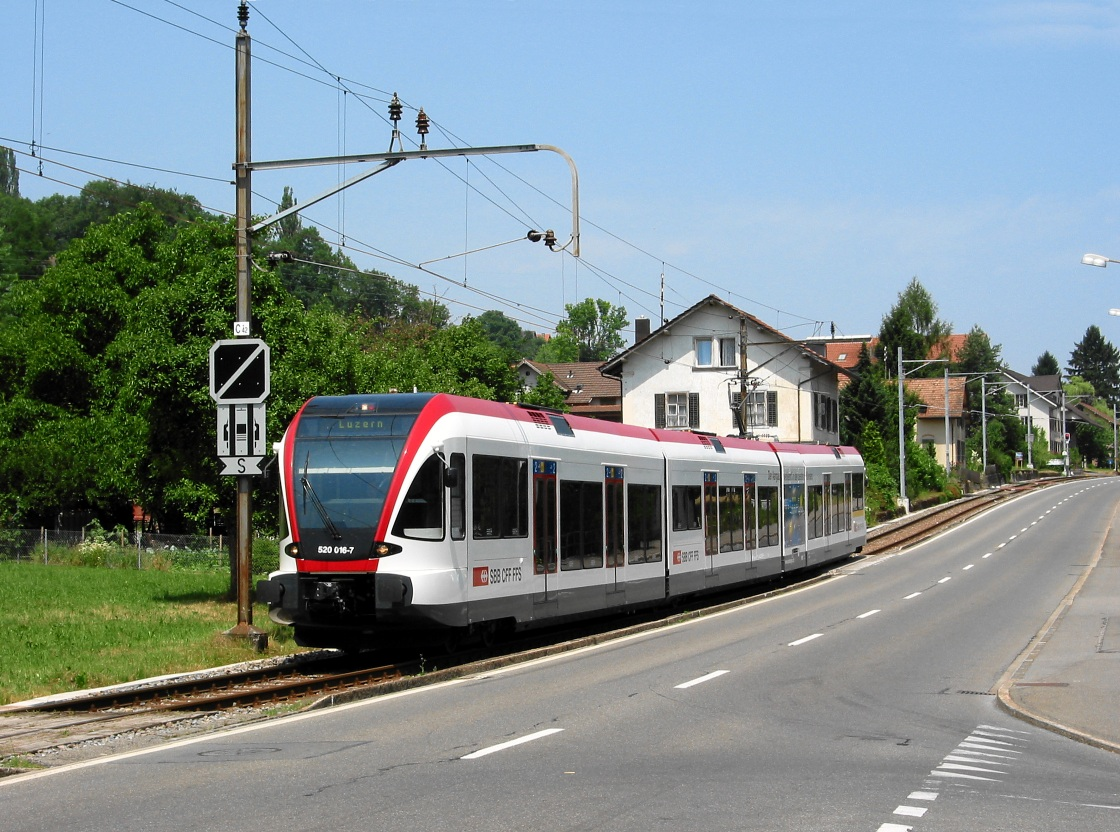
Seetalstrasse and railway near Beinwil am See

The Seetal is a valley in the cantons of Lucerne and Aargau in Switzerland. The valley descends from south to north from near Eschenbach (in the canton of Lucerne) to Lenzburg (in the canton of Aargau), and is drained by the Aabach and the Ron. The valley is distinguished by Lake Hallwil and Lake Baldegg, from which it takes its name (Lake Valley).

== Communities ==
The following municipalities lie within the Seetal:

- Aesch, Altwis
- Ballwil, Beinwil am See, Birrwil, Boniswil
- Dürrenäsch
- Egliswil, Ermensee, Eschenbach
- Fahrwangen
- Hallwil, Hitzkirch, Hochdorf, Hohenrain
- Leutwil
- Meisterschwanden
- Römerswil
- Seengen, Seon, Schongau

== Transport ==
The valley is followed throughout its length by the Seetalstrasse main road and by the Seetal railway line, which both serve to link Lucerne and Lenzburg. The railway line closely parallels the road, with many of the characteristics of a roadside tramway, and stations serve many of the villages of the valley.
