= Meisterschwanden =

- Municipality
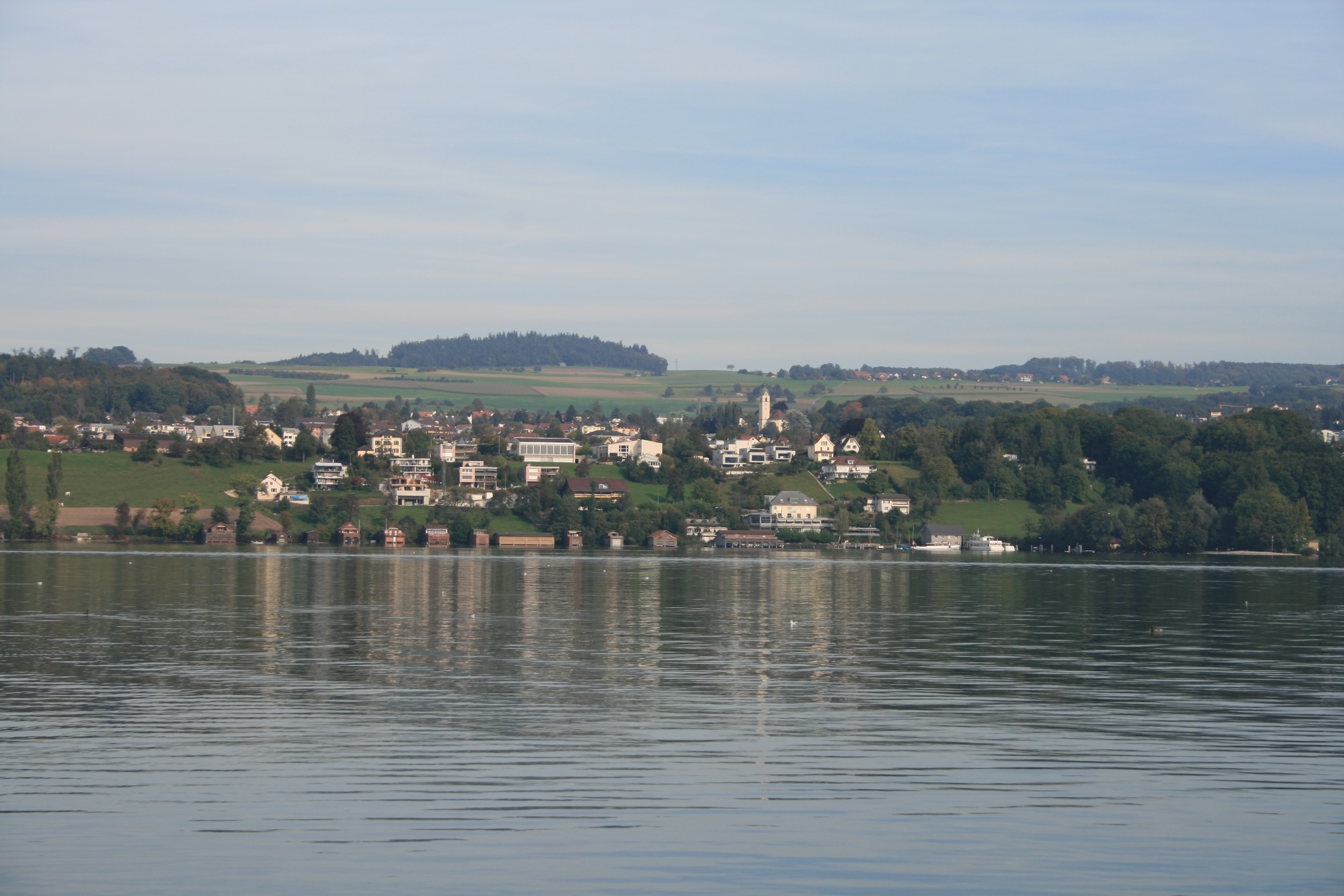

- Flag Coat of arms
- Location of Meisterschwanden
- Location within Switzerland Location within Canton of Aargau
- Coordinates: 47°18′N 8°14′E
- Country: Switzerland
- Canton: Aargau
- District: Lenzburg

Area
  - Total: 4.27 km^{2} (1.65 sq mi)
- Elevation: 505 m (1,657 ft)

Population (December 2006)
  - Total: 2,364
  - Density: 554/km^{2} (1,430/sq mi)
- Time zone: UTC+01:00 (CET)
  - Summer (DST): UTC+02:00 (CEST)
- Postal code: 5616
- SFOS number: 4202
- ISO 3166 code: CH-AG
- Surrounded by: Beinwil am See, Birrwil, Fahrwangen, Sarmenstorf, Seengen
- Twin towns: Saint-Claude-de-Diray (France)
- Website: www.meisterschwanden.ch

Meisterschwanden is a municipality in the district of Lenzburg in the canton of Aargau in Switzerland.

== History ==
Aerial view (1952)

There were two neolithic lake side settlements, at Seerose and Erlenhölzli, near the modern Meisterschwanden. Both sites were discovered from archeological digs on the lake shore. Additionally, at the Erlenhölzli site, divers discovered traces of Pfyn culture ceramics, stone tools and several artifacts made of wood, including a bow and arrow fragment all from about 3,600 BC.

Meisterschwanden is first mentioned in 1173 as Meistersvanc though this comes from a 14th Century copy of the original. In 1179 it was mentioned as Maestirwanch. In 1363 the Twingherrschaft transferred from the lords of Meisterschwanden to the Lords of Hallwyl. The high court rights came to Bern in 1415. During the second Villmergen war in 1712, Fahrwangen was used as a camp by the Reformed troops. As the Catholic troops attacked, according to legend, the women of Fahrwangen and Meisterschwanden marched out to join the soldiers. The Protestant Bernese troops were so impressed with the valor of the women, that they granted them a day when the women could command. Since then, on the second Sunday in January they have celebrated the Meitlisunntig (Girls' Sunday). On this day, women from both villages run through the streets carrying nets. Any man who is captured in a net must pay his Lösegelds or ransom (often in the form of alcoholic drinks) to get free.

A chapel was already in the village before 1300. Until 1817 it was part of the parish of Seengen, but then formed its own parish. The Reformed parish church was built in 1820-22 and the Catholic church was built in 1977.

Economically, the village was dependent on agriculture, which was supplemented by fishing and some viticulture. In the 18th Century, small scale cotton processing businesses appeared in the village. This was replaced in 1850 by straw goods manufacturing. At the beginning of the 21st Century, there are some small and medium enterprises as well as day tourism (2 hotels on the lake) in the village.

The steam boat navigation on the Lake Hallwyl began in 1888. In 1916, the village received a rail connection (Wohlen-Meisterschwanden-rail). A bus line has stopped in the village since 1997.

== Geography ==
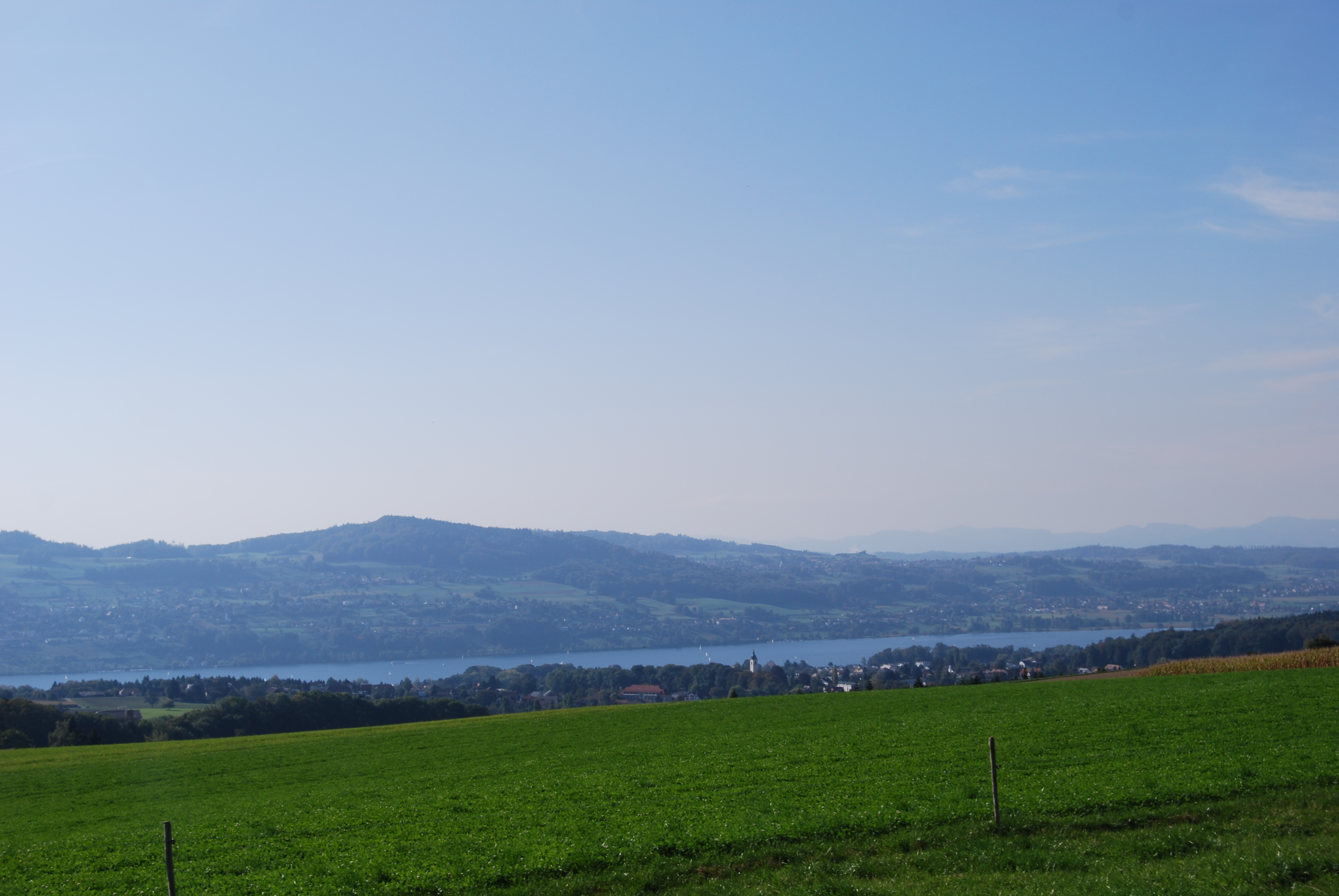
Meisterschwanden and Lake Hallwil, seen from Lindenberg

Meisterschwanden is located in the Lenzburg district, in the Seetal valley on a terrace above the western bank of the Hallwilersee. Originally it stretched along the village stream, but has since spread out.

The municipality consists of the haufendorf village (an irregular, unplanned and quite closely packed village, built around a central square) of Meisterschwanden and, since 1900, the hamlet of Tennwil. It has an area, as of 2009, of 4.27 square kilometers (1.65 sq mi). Of this area, 2.46 km^{2} (0.95 sq mi) or 57.6% is used for agricultural purposes, while 0.8 km^{2} (0.31 sq mi) or 18.7% is forested. Of the rest of the land, 1.02 km^{2} (0.39 sq mi) or 23.9% is settled (buildings or roads), 0.01 km^{2} (2.5 acres) or 0.2% is either rivers or lakes and 0.01 km^{2} (2.5 acres) or 0.2% is unproductive land.

Of the built up area, industrial buildings made up 1.4% of the total area while housing and buildings made up 12.6% and transportation infrastructure made up 5.9%. Power and water infrastructure as well as other special developed areas made up 1.9% of the area while parks, green belts and sports fields made up 2.1%. Out of the forested land, 17.1% of the total land area is heavily forested and 1.6% is covered with orchards or small clusters of trees. Of the agricultural land, 37.9% is used for growing crops and 16.2% is pastures, while 3.5% is used for orchards or vine crops. All the water in the municipality is in rivers and streams.

== Coat of arms ==
The blazon of the municipal coat of arms is Per fess nebuly Azure and Argent.

== Demographics ==
Meisterschwanden has a population (as of December 2020) of 3,032. As of June 2009, 14.6% of the population are foreign nationals. Over the last 10 years (1997–2007) the population has changed at a rate of 20.2%. Most of the population (as of 2000) speaks German (90.9%), with Italian being second most common ( 3.8%) and Serbo-Croatian being third ( 1.6%).

The age distribution, as of 2008, in Meisterschwanden is; 251 children or 10.2% of the population are between 0 and 9 years old and 277 teenagers or 11.2% are between 10 and 19. Of the adult population, 235 people or 9.5% of the population are between 20 and 29 years old. 326 people or 13.2% are between 30 and 39, 488 people or 19.8% are between 40 and 49, and 379 people or 15.3% are between 50 and 59. The senior population distribution is 282 people or 11.4% of the population are between 60 and 69 years old, 153 people or 6.2% are between 70 and 79, there are 67 people or 2.7% who are between 80 and 89, and there are 12 people or 0.5% who are 90 and older.

As of 2000 the average number of residents per living room was 0.55 which is about equal to the cantonal average of 0.57 per room. In this case, a room is defined as space of a housing unit of at least 4 m^{2} (43 sq ft) as normal bedrooms, dining rooms, living rooms, kitchens and habitable cellars and attics. About 60.7% of the total households were owner occupied, or in other words did not pay rent (though they may have a mortgage or a rent-to-own agreement).

As of 2000, there were 46 homes with 1 or 2 persons in the household, 385 homes with 3 or 4 persons in the household, and 348 homes with 5 or more persons in the household. As of 2000, there were 807 private households (homes and apartments) in the municipality, and an average of 2.5 persons per household. In 2008 there were 508 single family homes (or 45.7% of the total) out of a total of 1,111 homes and apartments. There were a total of 16 empty apartments for a 1.4% vacancy rate. As of 2007, the construction rate of new housing units was 22.6 new units per 1000 residents.

In the 2007 federal election the most popular party was the SVP which received 37.3% of the vote. The next three most popular parties were the FDP (20.9%), the SP (15.5%) and the CVP (8.9%).

The historical population is given in the following table:

Historical population
| Year | Pop. | ±% |
|---|---|---|
| 1764 | 308 | — |
| 1850 | 1,020 | +231.2% |
| 1900 | 1,113 | +9.1% |
| 1950 | 1,089 | −2.2% |
| 2000 | 2,055 | +88.7% |

== Heritage sites of national significance ==
The Villa Fischer at Kirchrain 11 is listed as a Swiss heritage site of national significance. The entire village of Meisterschwanden is designated as part of the Inventory of Swiss Heritage Sites.

== Economy ==
As of 2007, Meisterschwanden had an unemployment rate of 1.87%. As of 2005, there were 47 people employed in the primary economic sector and about 21 businesses involved in this sector. 250 people are employed in the secondary sector and there are 25 businesses in this sector. 424 people are employed in the tertiary sector, with 69 businesses in this sector.

In 2000 there were 1,099 workers who lived in the municipality. Of these, 837 or about 76.2% of the residents worked outside Meisterschwanden while 306 people commuted into the municipality for work. There were a total of 568 jobs (of at least 6 hours per week) in the municipality. Of the working population, 6.9% used public transportation to get to work, and 60.9% used a private car.

== Religion ==
From the 2000 census, 633 or 30.8% were Roman Catholic, while 991 or 48.2% belonged to the Swiss Reformed Church. Of the rest of the population, there was 1 individual who belonged to the Christian Catholic faith.

== Education ==
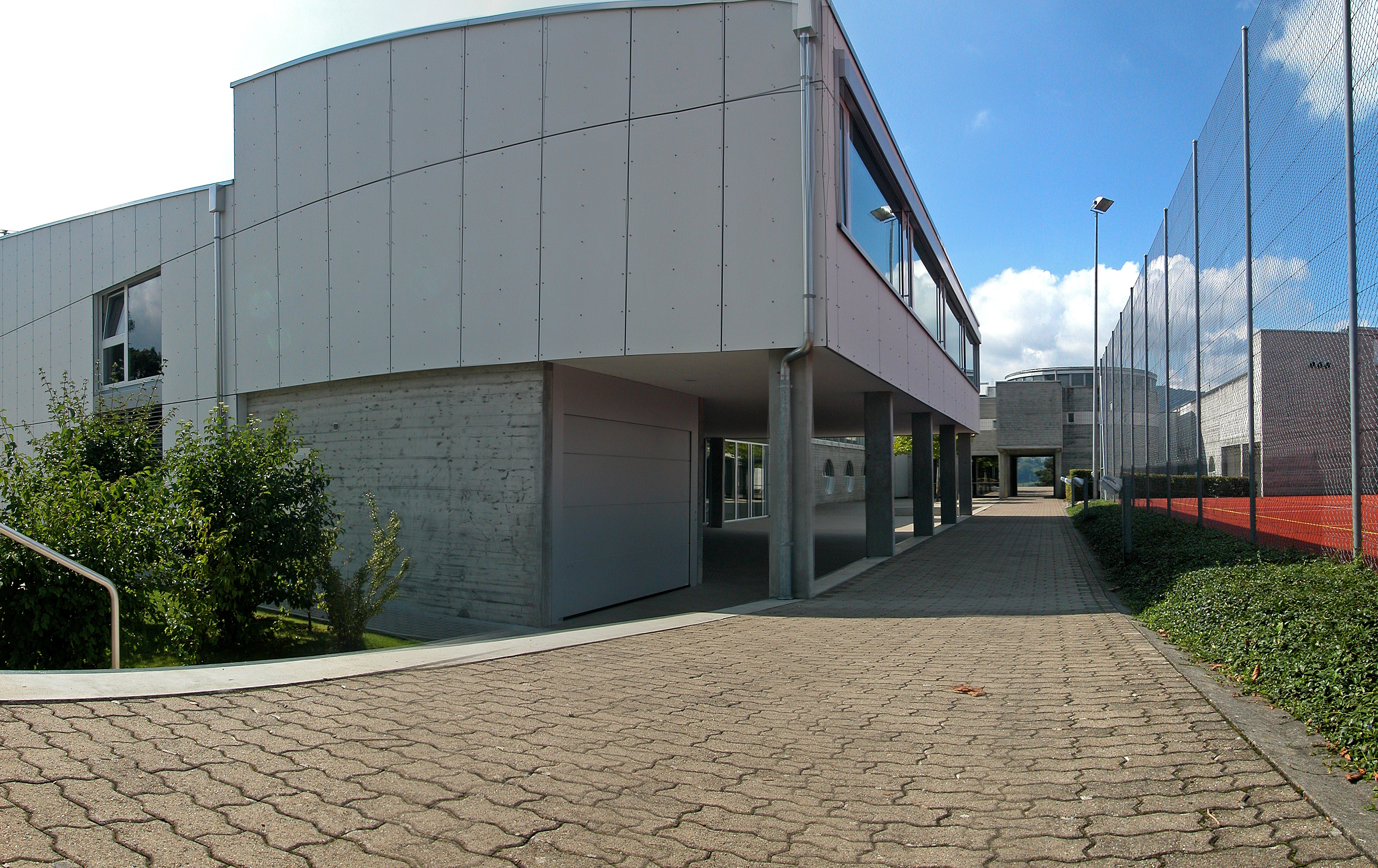
School building in Meisterschwanden

In Meisterschwanden about 76.9% of the population (between age 25-64) have completed either non-mandatory upper secondary education or additional higher education (either university or a Fachhochschule). Of the school age population (in the 2008/2009 school year), there are 164 students attending primary school, there are 118 students attending secondary school in the municipality.

Meisterschwanden is home to the Gemeindebibliothek Meisterschwanden (municipal library of Meisterschwanden). The library has (as of 2008) 4,840 books or other media, and loaned out 11,228 items in the same year. It was open a total of 250 days with average of 11 hours per week during that year.

== Culture ==
The SEETAL invitational art show and competition is held bi-annually in Meisterschwanden.
