= Hallwil =

- Municipality
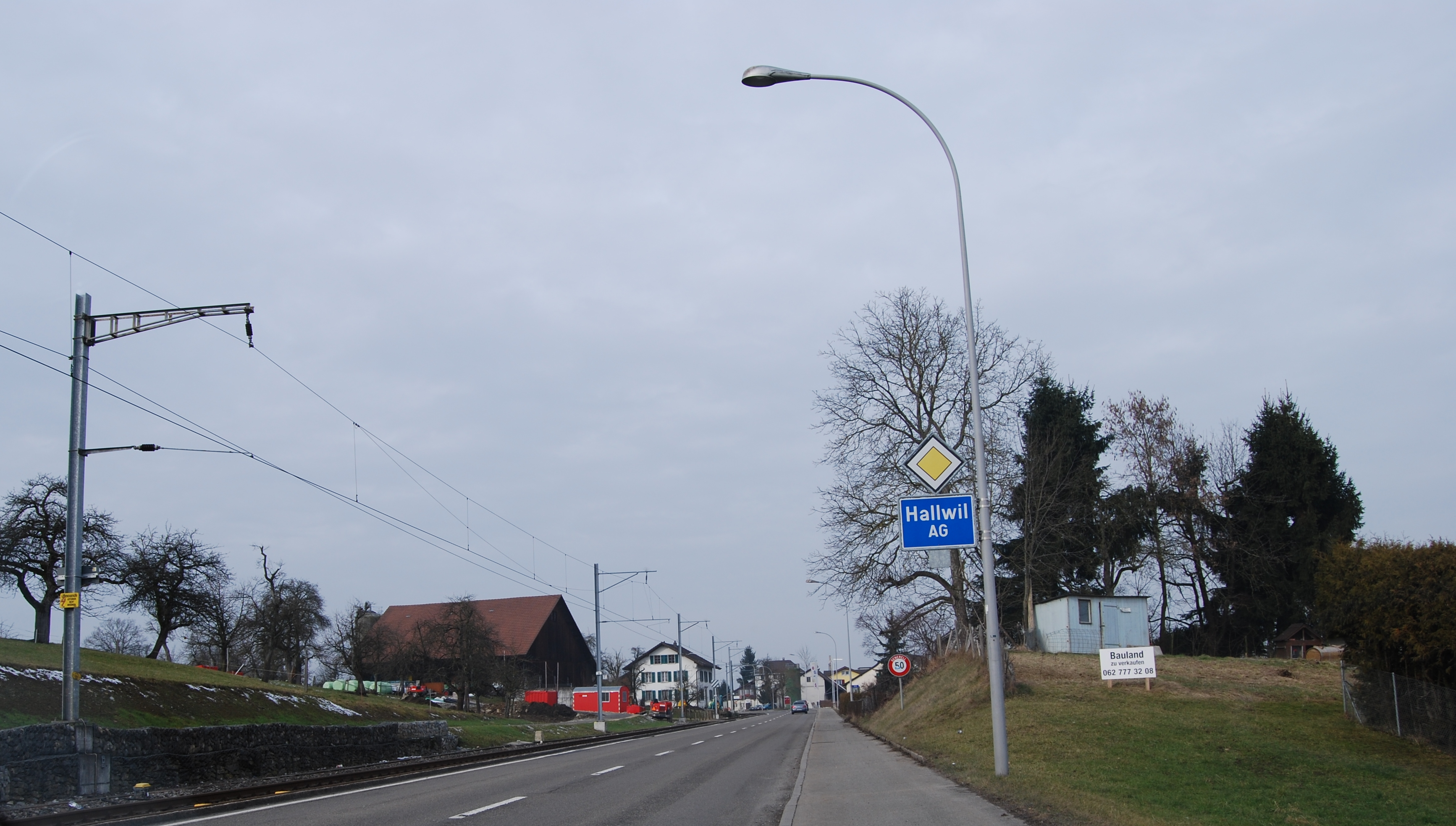

- Flag Coat of arms
- Location of Hallwil
- Location within Switzerland Location within Canton of Aargau
- Coordinates: 47°20′N 8°11′E
- Country: Switzerland
- Canton: Aargau
- District: Lenzburg

Area
  - Total: 2.18 km^{2} (0.84 sq mi)
- Elevation: 475 m (1,558 ft)

Population (December 2006)
  - Total: 722
  - Density: 331/km^{2} (858/sq mi)
- Time zone: UTC+01:00 (CET)
  - Summer (DST): UTC+02:00 (CEST)
- Postal code: 5705
- SFOS number: 4197
- ISO 3166 code: CH-AG
- Surrounded by: Boniswil, Dürrenäsch, Leutwil, Seengen, Seon
- Website: www.hallwil.ch

Hallwil is a municipality in the district of Lenzburg in the canton of Aargau in Switzerland.

The Castle of Hallwyl is located in the neighboring municipality Seengen.

Aerial view (1953)

== History ==
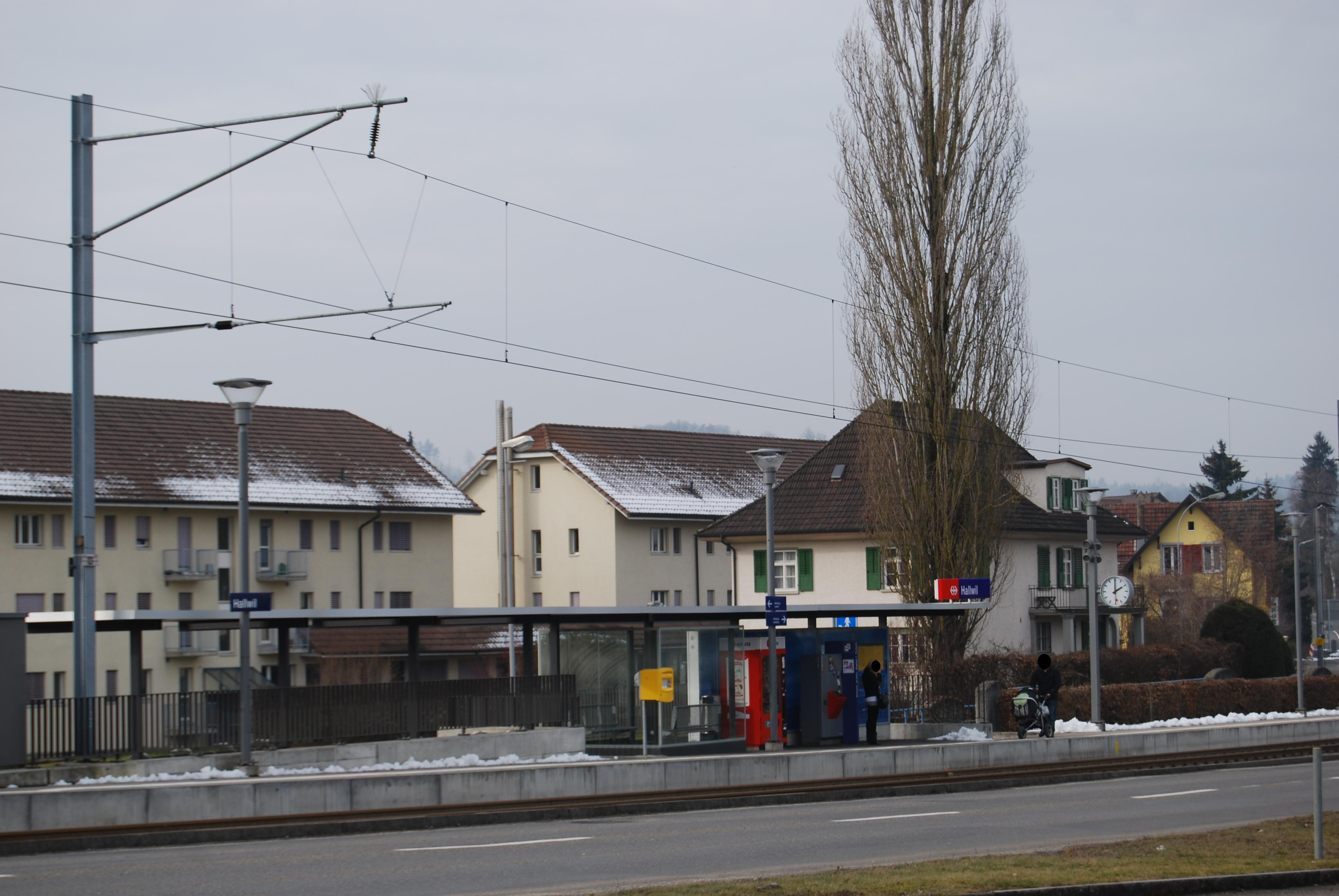
Train station of Hallwil

Hallwil is first mentioned in 1167 as de Allewilare. Between 1566 and 1950 it was, legally, known as Niederhallwil. The high court and rights to high justice of the Habsburgs in Hallwil ended in 1415 with the conquest of the Aargau by Bern. The rights to low justice were held by the Lords of Rinach and Hallwyl before they went into the possession of Bern, as part of the court district of Trostberg. The tithes, originally collected by Säckingen Abbey, later went to the Lords of Hallwyl who then gave them as a gift to the church of Seengen. In 1528 Bern converted to the Protestant Reformation and Hallwil became part of the Seengen parish.

Agriculture was the major economic activity until the 18th century. In the 18th century, the straw plaiting, silk ribbon and linen weaving industries became important. Between 1864 and 1971 the cigar industry dominated. In 1883 the Swiss Federal Railways station at Hallwyl-Dürrenäsch connected the village and the Federal Railway to the Seetalbahn railway. At the end of the 20th century small companies in the service sector and apparatus dominated.

== Geography ==
Hallwil is located in the Lenzburg district, on the left side of the Seetal valley. It is about 1.5 km (0.93 mi) north-west of Hallwyl castle. It consists of the linear village of Hallwil.

The municipality has an area, as of 2009, of 2.19 square kilometers (0.85 sq mi). Of this area, 1.52 km^{2} (0.59 sq mi) or 69.4% is used for agricultural purposes, while 0.28 km^{2} (0.11 sq mi) or 12.8% is forested. Of the rest of the land, 0.43 km^{2} (0.17 sq mi) or 19.6% is settled (buildings or roads).

Of the built up area, industrial buildings made up 2.7% of the total area while housing and buildings made up 11.0% and transportation infrastructure made up 5.5%. Out of the forested land, 11.4% of the total land area is heavily forested and 1.4% is covered with orchards or small clusters of trees. Of the agricultural land, 47.5% is used for growing crops and 18.3% is pastures, while 3.7% is used for orchards or vine crops.

== Coat of arms ==
The blazon of the municipal coat of arms is Gules a Palm tree Vert fructed Or issuant from Coupeaux of the second.

== Demographics ==
Hallwil has a population (as of December 2020) of 949 As of June 2009, 14.1% of the population are foreign nationals. Over the last 10 years (1997–2007) the population has changed at a rate of 1.6%. Most of the population (as of 2000) speaks German (89.5%), with Albanian being second most common ( 3.5%) and Italian being third ( 3.2%).

The age distribution, as of 2008, in Hallwil is; 65 children or 8.8% of the population are between 0 and 9 years old and 81 teenagers or 10.9% are between 10 and 19. Of the adult population, 85 people or 11.5% of the population are between 20 and 29 years old. 115 people or 15.5% are between 30 and 39, 144 people or 19.5% are between 40 and 49, and 109 people or 14.7% are between 50 and 59. The senior population distribution is 82 people or 11.1% of the population are between 60 and 69 years old, 35 people or 4.7% are between 70 and 79, there are 21 people or 2.8% who are between 80 and 89, and there are 3 people or 0.4% who are 90 and older.

As of 2000 the average number of residents per living room was 0.53 which is about equal to the cantonal average of 0.57 per room. In this case, a room is defined as space of a housing unit of at least 4 m^{2} (43 sq ft) as normal bedrooms, dining rooms, living rooms, kitchens and habitable cellars and attics. About 51% of the total households were owner occupied, or in other words did not pay rent (though they may have a mortgage or a rent-to-own agreement).

As of 2000, there were 23 homes with 1 or 2 persons in the household, 152 homes with 3 or 4 persons in the household, and 123 homes with 5 or more persons in the household. As of 2000, there were 311 private households (homes and apartments) in the municipality, and an average of 2.3 persons per household. In 2008 there were 149 single family homes (or 41.4% of the total) out of a total of 360 homes and apartments. There were a total of 7 empty apartments for a 1.9% vacancy rate. As of 2007, the construction rate of new housing units was 14.7 new units per 1000 residents.

In the 2007 federal election the most popular party was the SVP which received 50.6% of the vote. The next three most popular parties were the FDP (10.8%), the SP (10.3%) and the Green Party (7.4%).

The historical population is given in the following table:

Historical population
Year	Pop.	±%
1798	396	—
1850	428	+8.1%
1900	387	−9.6%
1950	508	+31.3%
2000	721	+41.9%

== Festivals ==
The municipality has several midwinter-festivals or customs that were once celebrated throughout the Seetal, but now mostly only happen in Hallwil. These festivals include the Chlauschlöpfen, Klausjagen, Wienechtschind, Silvestertrösche and Bärzeli. The Chlauschlöpfen involves cracking a whip to wake the sleeping Saint Nicholas. Klausjagen originally involved chasing wild spirits, but now is a parade that chases Saint Nicholas. The Wienechtschind occurs on December 24 and consists of 7 girls (Christmas children) who travel throughout the town singing at each house. Silvestertrösche occurs on New Year's Eve when a large Silvester bonfire is lit on a hill near Hallwil. The final custom, the Bärzeli occurs on Berchtoldstag (2 January) when 15 Bärzeli (specifically costumed figures) march though the village streets granting luck to all they meet.

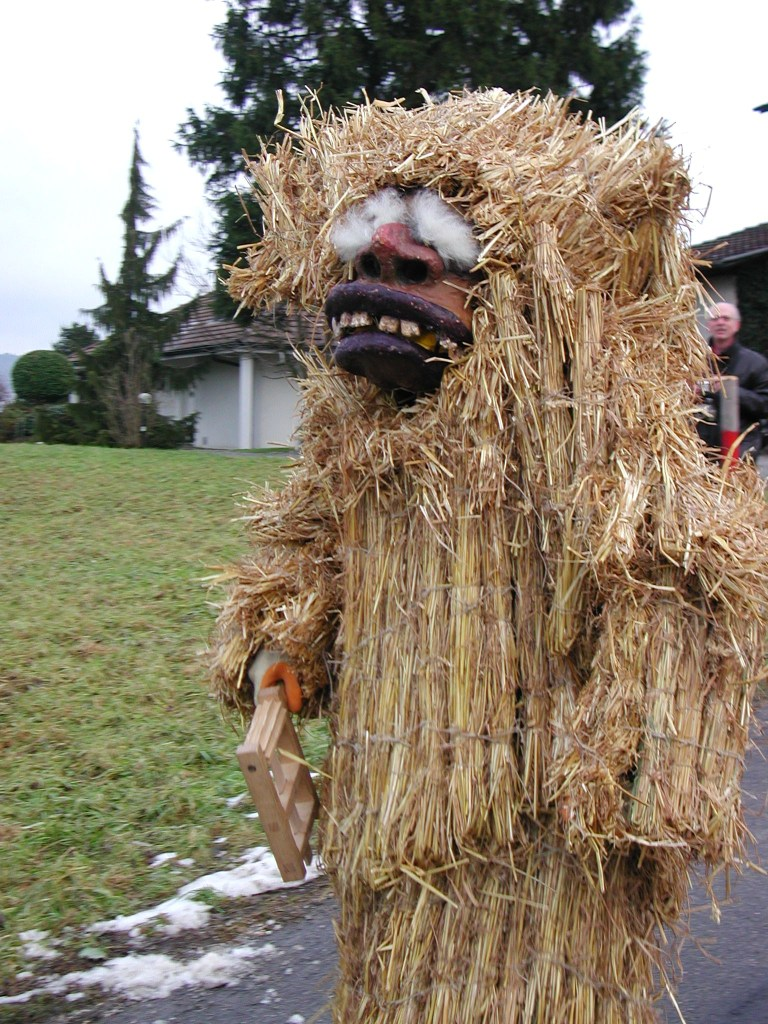
Straumaa or Straw man, one of the Bärzeli figures

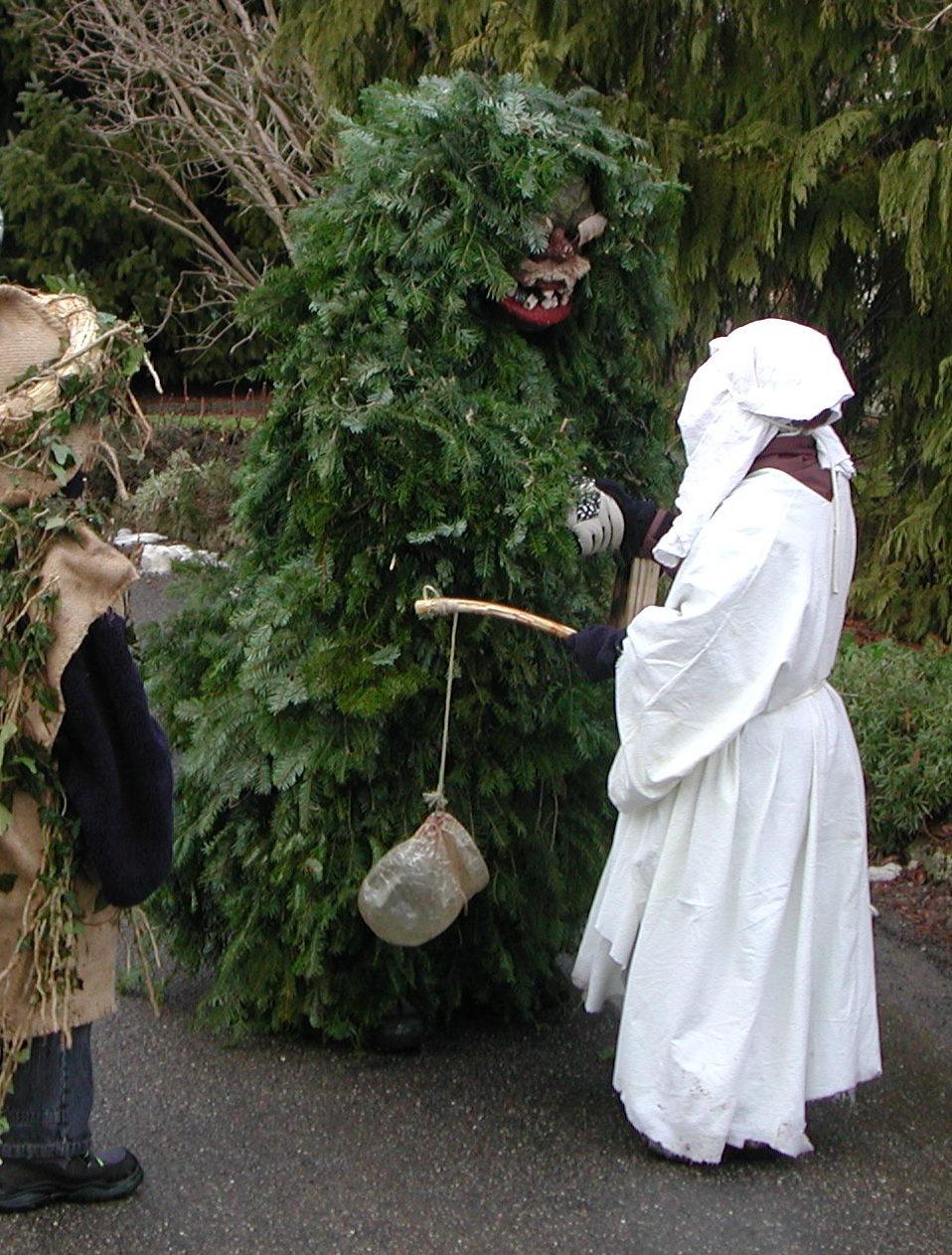
Tannreesig or Fir man, one of the Bärzeli figures

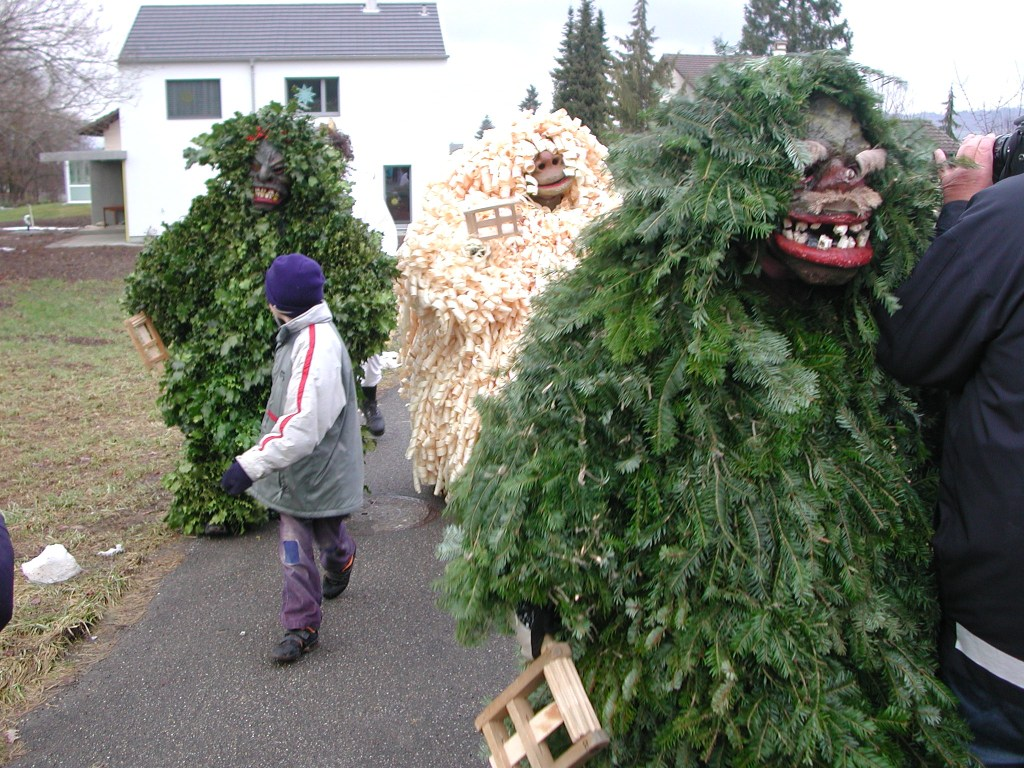
Three Bärzeli figures

== Economy ==
As of 2007, Hallwil had an unemployment rate of 1.75%. As of 2005, there were 23 people employed in the primary economic sector and about 9 businesses involved in this sector. 136 people are employed in the secondary sector and there are 20 businesses in this sector. 107 people are employed in the tertiary sector, with 41 businesses in this sector.

In 2000 there were 409 workers who lived in the municipality. Of these, 310 or about 75.8% of the residents worked outside Hallwil while 187 people commuted into the municipality for work. There were a total of 286 jobs (of at least 6 hours per week) in the municipality. Of the working population, 9.8% used public transportation to get to work, and 57.9% used a private car.

== Religion ==
From the 2000 census, 169 or 23.4% were Roman Catholic, while 391 or 54.2% belonged to the Swiss Reformed Church.

== Education ==
The entire Swiss population is generally well educated. In Hallwil about 73.7% of the population (between age 25 and 64) have completed either non-mandatory upper secondary education or additional higher education (either university or a Fachhochschule). Of the school age population (in the 2008/2009 school year), there are 45 students attending primary school in the municipality. Hallwil is home to the Gemeindebibliotheken und Schulbibliotheken library. The library has (as of 2008) 3,455 books or other media. The library was open a total of 120 days with average of 4 hours per week during that year.
