= Seengen–Riesi =

Seengen–Riesi refers to an archaeological site in Seengen in the Swiss canton of Aargau, in the Riesi (also known as Risle or Rieslen) moorland reserve on Lake Hallwil, in the area where the Aabach stream flows into the lake. It is a lakeside settlement (also known as a pile dwelling village or palafitte) from the Late Bronze Age (11th–9th century BC). Since 2011, the site has been part of the UNESCO World Heritage Site Prehistoric Pile Dwellings around the Alps.
