= Hallwyl Castle =

Castle in Seengen, Switzerland

- Schloss Hallwyl
- Seengen
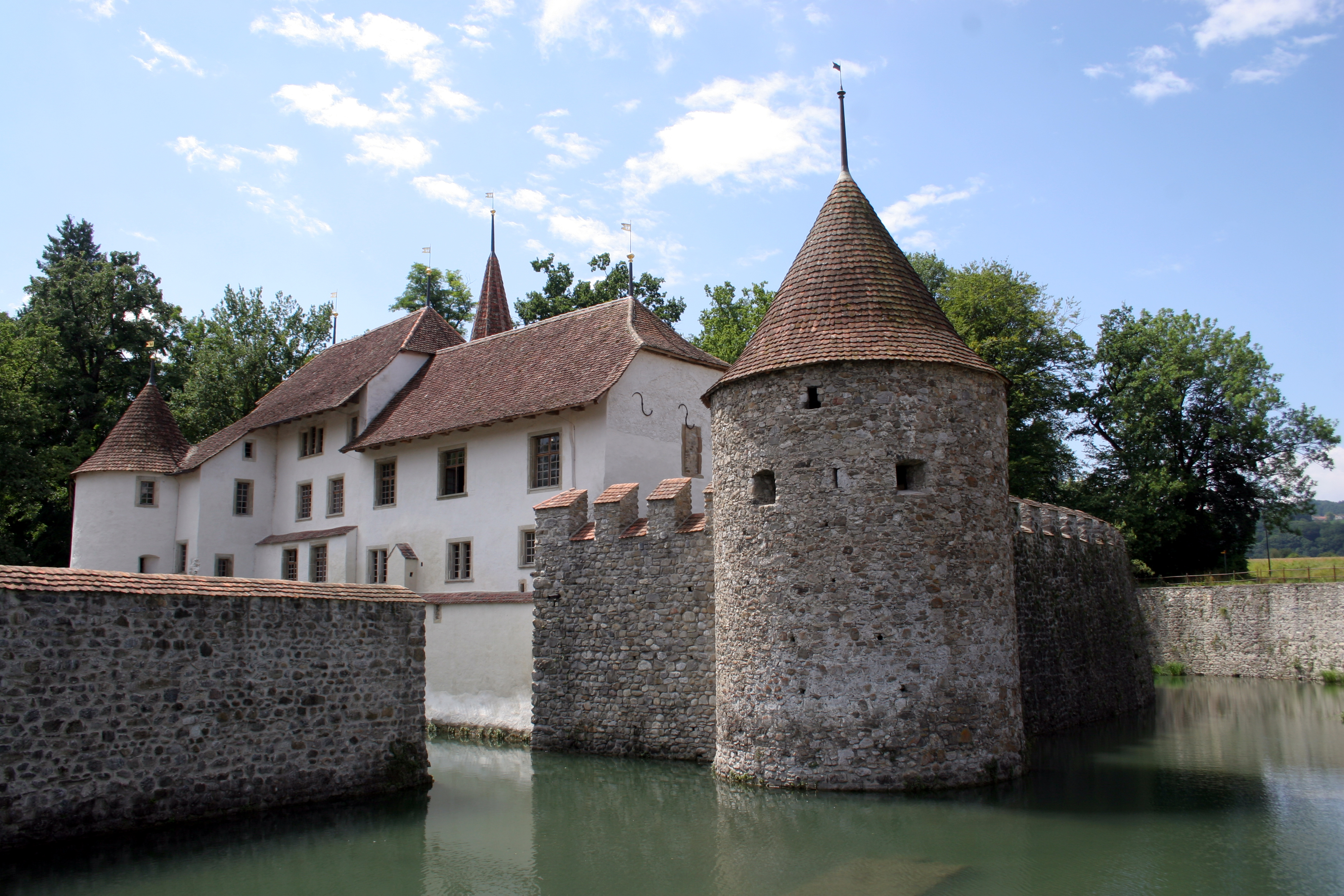
- Hallwyl Castle

Site information
- Type: water castle
- Code: CH-AG
- Condition: preserved

Location
- Coordinates: 47°19′23.5″N 8°11′39″E
- Height: 450 m above the sea

Site history
- Built: 1265

Hallwyl Castle (German: Schloss Hallwyl; IPA: [halˈviːl]) is one of the most important moated castles in Switzerland. It is located on two islands in the River Aabach, just north of the northern end of Lake Hallwil in the municipality of Seengen in the canton of Aargau. Since 1925, it has been open to the public, and since 1994 it has been owned by the canton of Aargau and is part of the museum of Aargau.

== History ==
The first mention of the castle is in the year 1256. However, the originally free noble family of Hallwyl were first mentioned in a testament from 1167. Some discoveries indicate that the castle was founded in the late 12th century. Hallwyl Castle was the home castle of the Lords of Hallwyl, who owned the surrounding land and parts of the lake as their personal property. It consisted of a residential tower with a dry moat. In 1265 the keep was expanded. In the early 14th century the dry ditch was converted into a moat. The old castle tower was surrounded by a moat and a wall on what became the Rear Island. To the east of the Rear Island, an artificial island was built in the River Aabach. This island, the Front Island, was outfitted with a curtain wall, and was occupied by residential and commercial buildings. During the conquest of Aargau in 1415 by the Swiss Confederation, the castle (which was known after 1369 as the Ganerbenburg) was burnt by the Bernese troops. The castle was immediately rebuilt and expanded. After the construction of two turrets in 1500 and 1579-1590 there was an extensive general renovation. After long neglect, the castle was partly rebuilt in neo-Gothic style in 1861 and 1870–74. However, this project was mostly reversed in 1914.

In 1925 the family foundation made an effort to preserve the castle. Since 1994, it has been in possession of the Canton of Aargau. Excavations and building research, led by Swedish archaeologist Nils Lithberg, were carried out in 1910–16 on behalf of Wilhelmina von Hallwyl. Further research, which came up with new dates, was done by the Canton of Aargau Archaeology in 1995–2003.

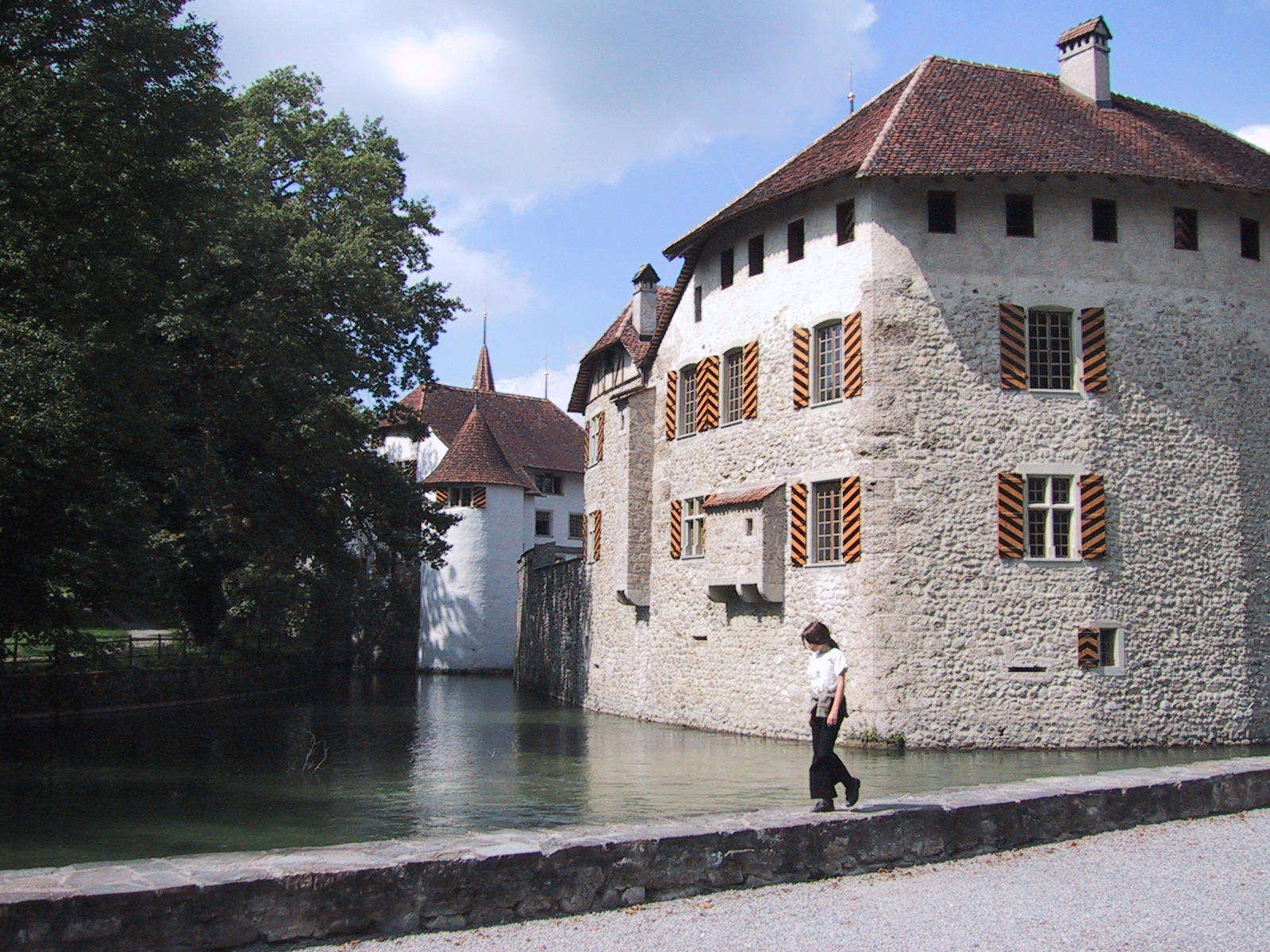
Residential tower on the Front Island

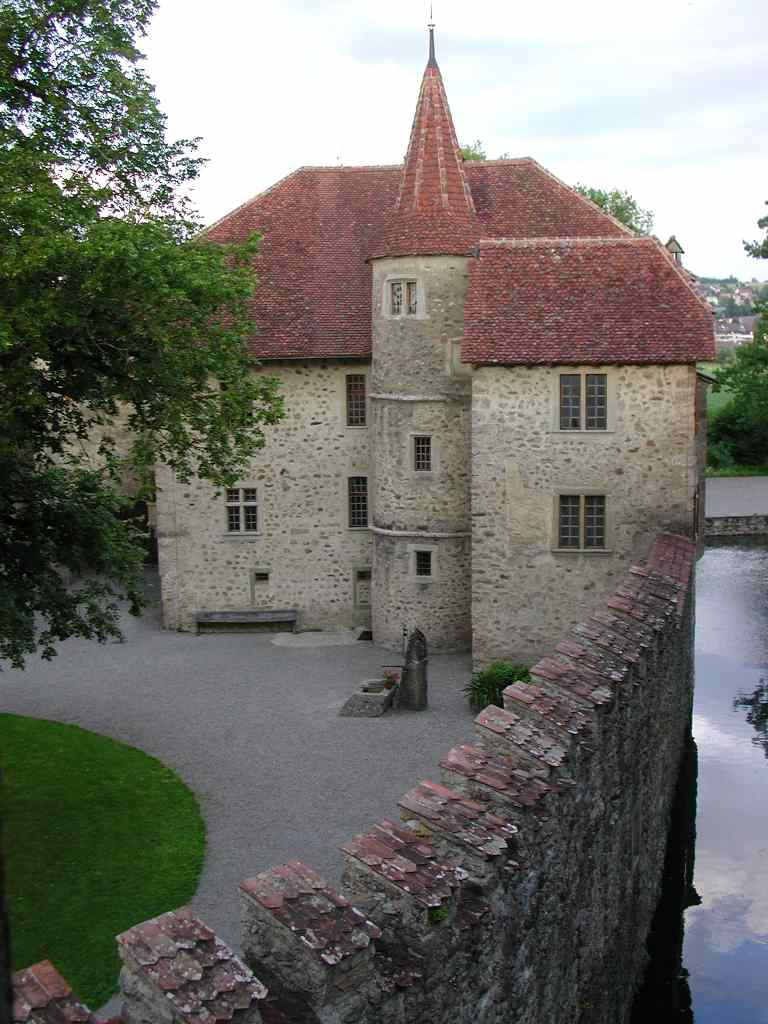
Residential tower and inner courtyard

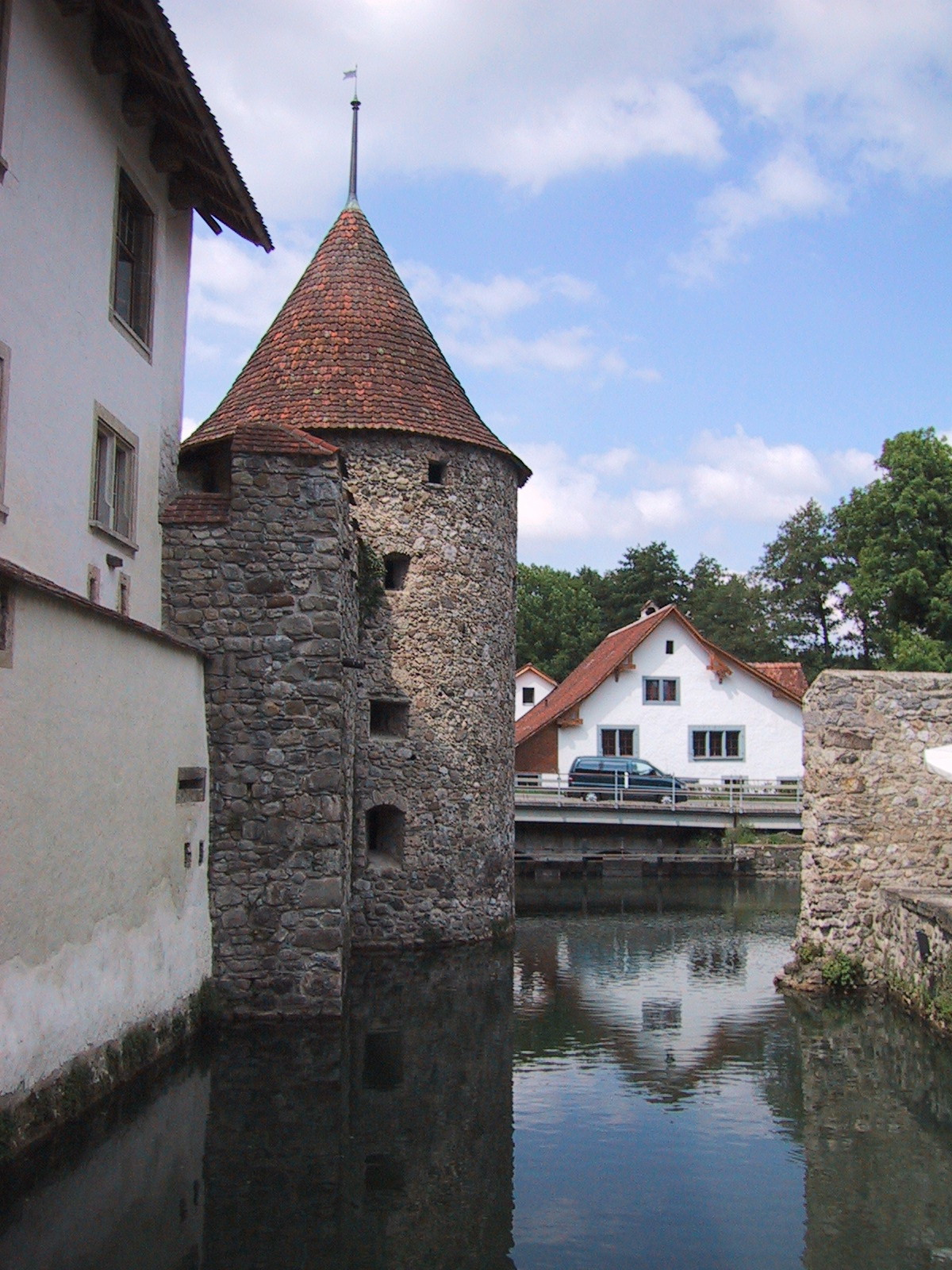
Keep with Verliesturm (tower), in the rear is the castle mill

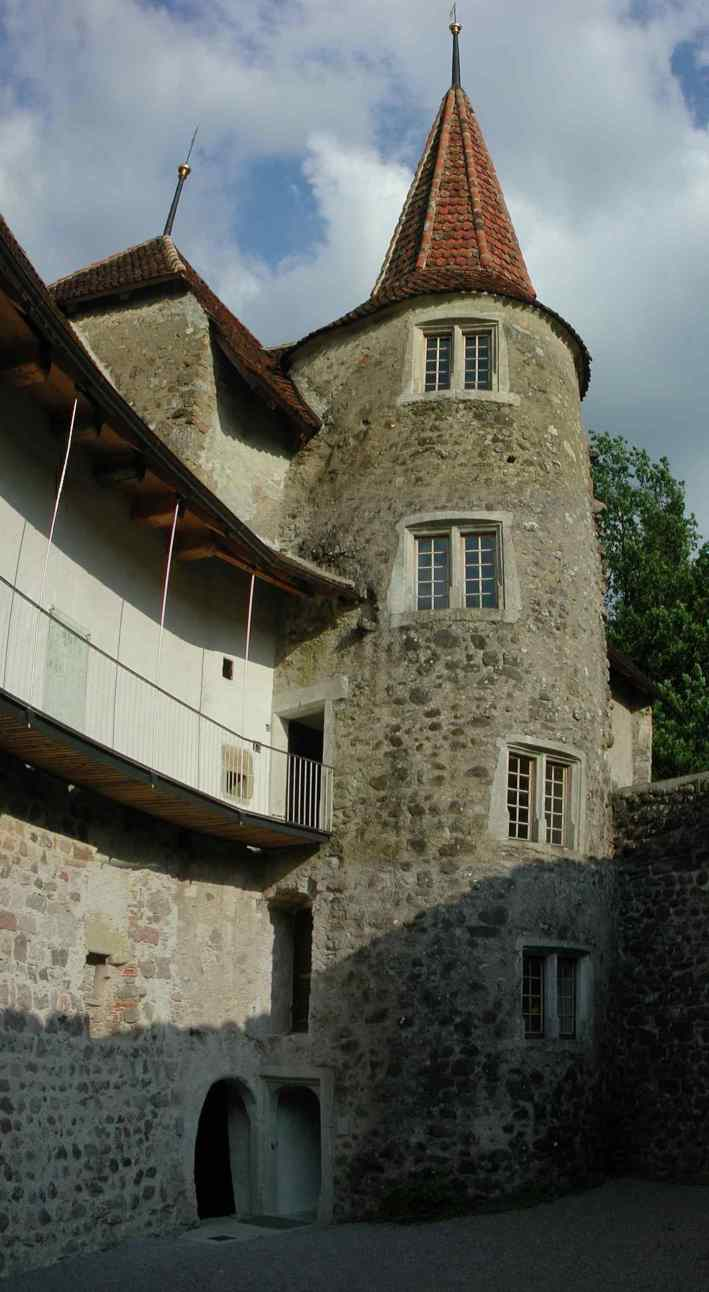
Keep with stairs

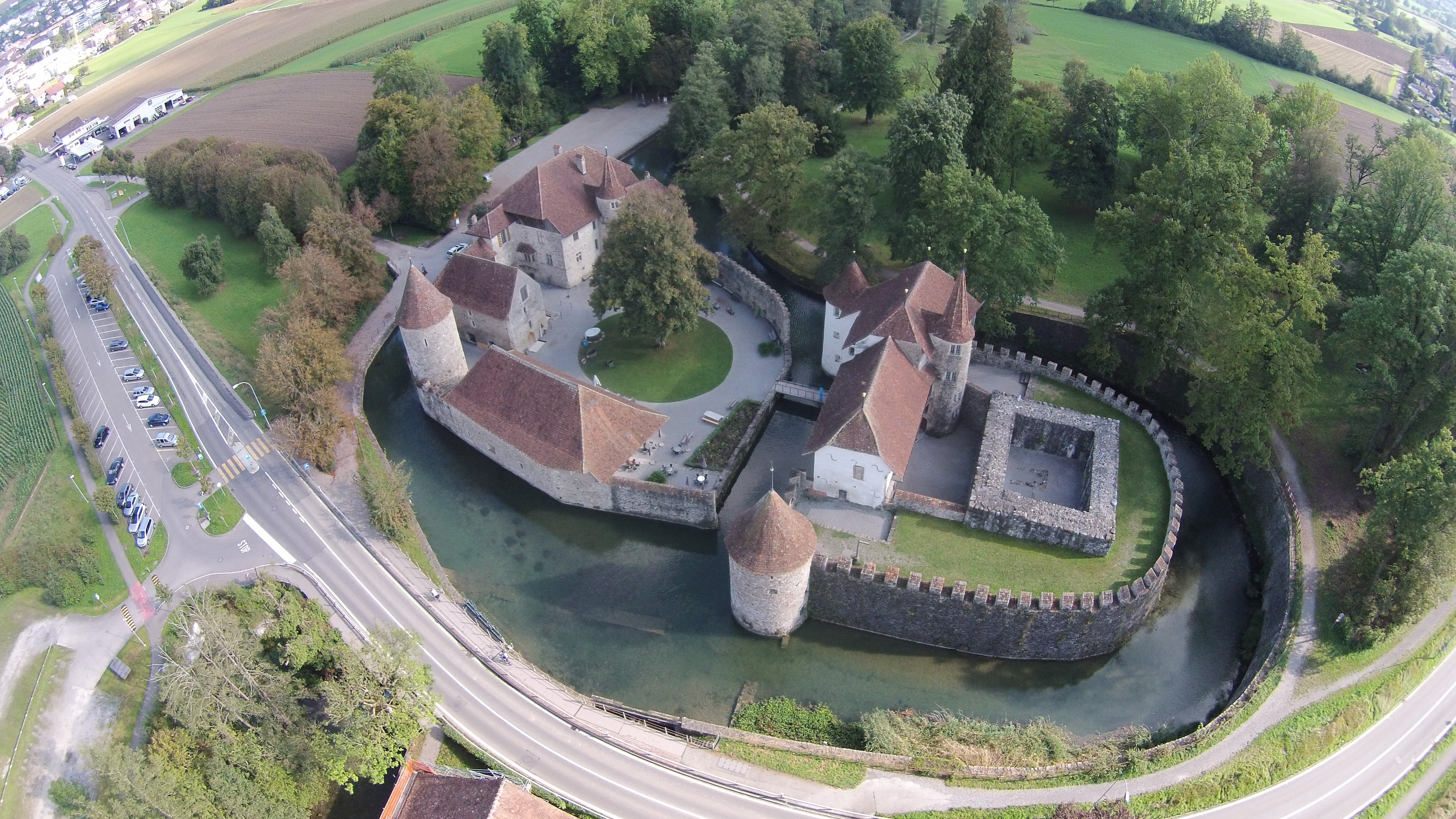
Aerial view of the castle

== Films ==
The Internet Movie Database lists Schloss Hallwyl as a filming location for Erwin C. Dietrich's comedy, Die Sexabenteuer der drei Musketiere (1971).

== See also ==
- List of castles and fortresses in Switzerland
