= Lake Hallwil =

Lake largely in the Canton of Aargau, Switzerland

- Hallwilersee
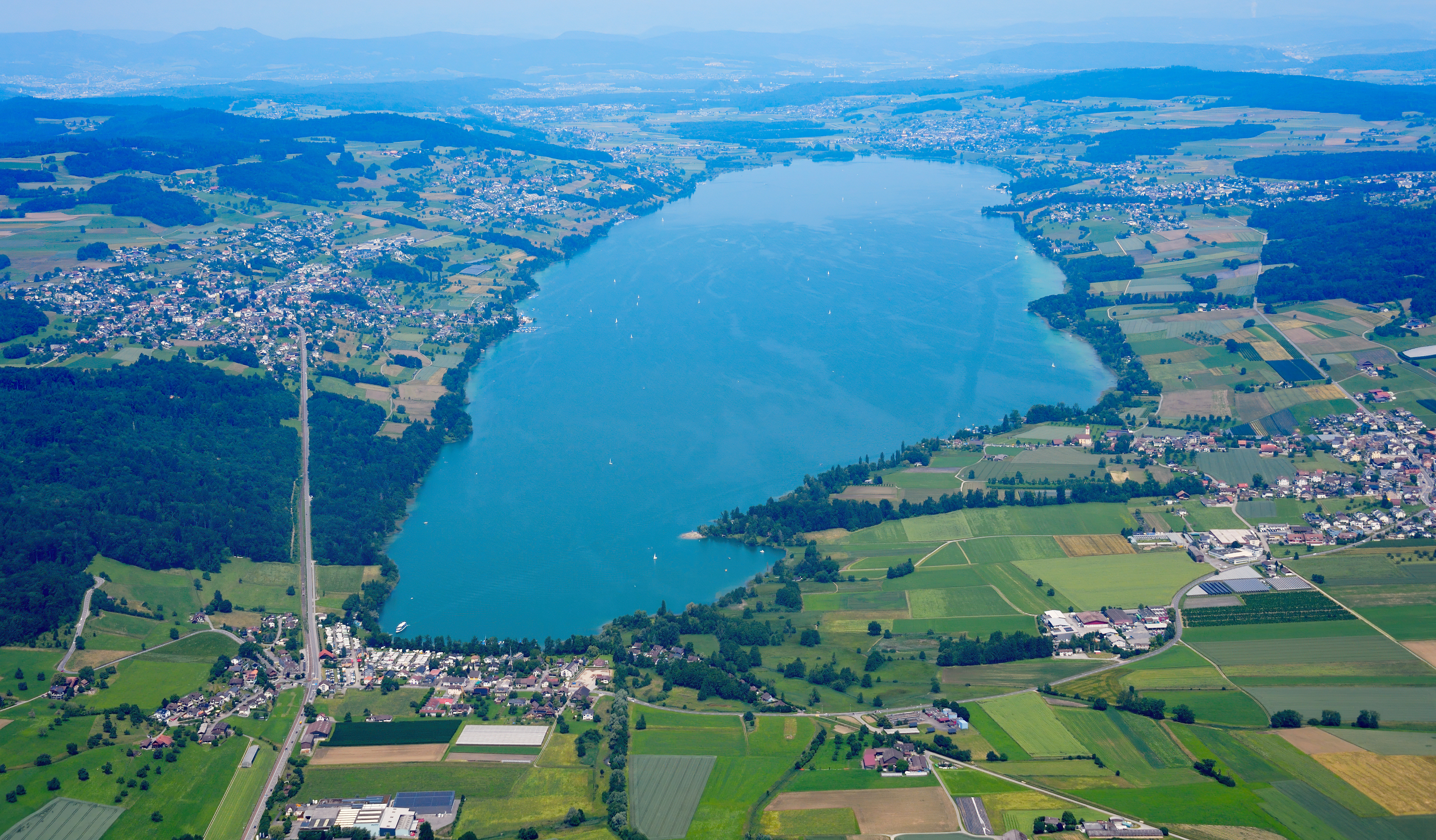

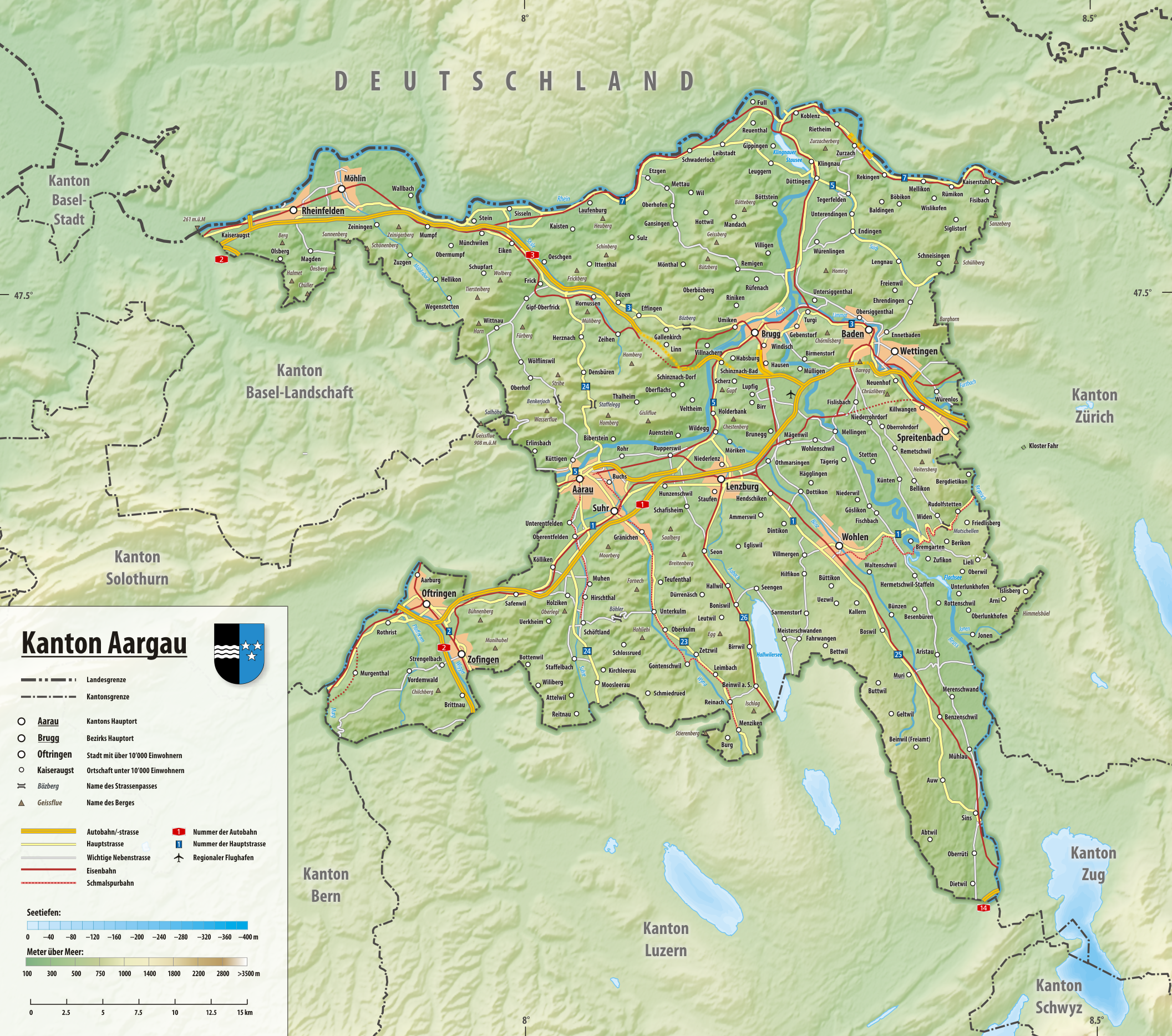
- Location within Canton of Lucerne Location within Canton of Aargau Location within Switzerland Location within Alps
- Interactive map of Lake Hallwil
- Location: Aargau
- Coordinates: 47°17′N 8°12′E
- Primary inflows: Aabach
- Primary outflows: Aabach
- Catchment area: 128 km^{2} (49 sq mi)
- Basin countries: Switzerland
- Max. length: 8.4 km (5.2 mi)
- Max. width: 1.5 km (0.93 mi)
- Surface area: 10.3 km^{2} (4.0 sq mi)
- Average depth: 28 m (92 ft)
- Max. depth: 48 m (157 ft)
- Water volume: 0.285 km^{3} (231,000 acre⋅ft)
- Residence time: 3.9 years
- Surface elevation: 449 m (1,473 ft)
- Settlements: Beinwil am See, Meisterschwanden, Seengen

Lake Hallwil (German: Hallwilersee) is a lake largely in the Canton of Aargau, Switzerland, located at 47°17′N 8°12′E. It is the largest lake in Aargau and lies mostly in the districts of Lenzburg and Kulm on the southern edge of the canton. The southern tip of the lake reaches into the canton of Lucerne. The main river leading to this lake is the Aabach, which is coming from the Lake Baldegg.

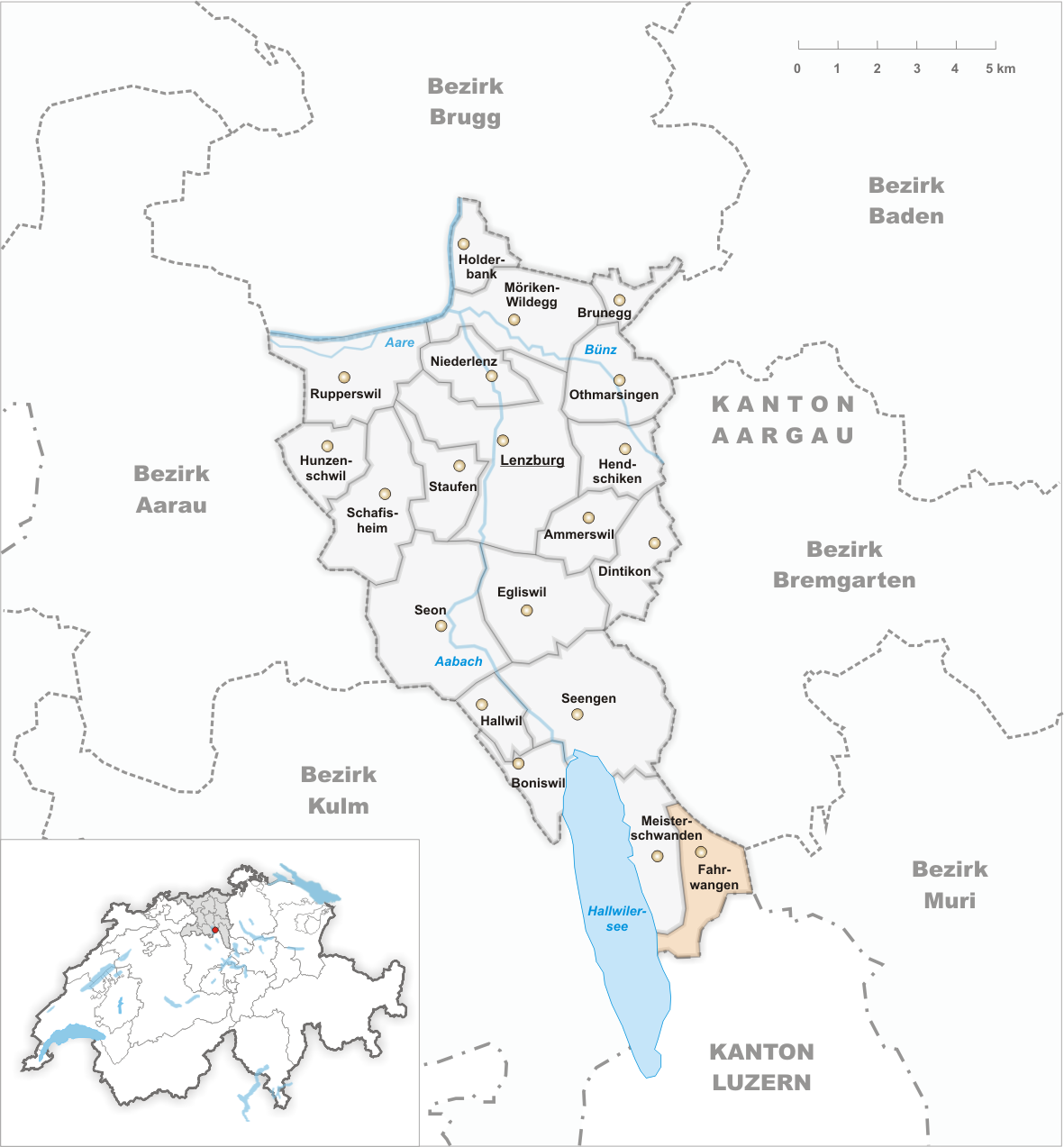
Lake Hallwil in the canton of Aargau

Its surface is approximately 10.3 km^{2} and its maximum depth is 48 metres. It is a popular vacation destination.

In 1938 Sir Malcolm Campbell set a world water speed record in Blue Bird K3 on the lake.

== See also ==
- List of lakes of Switzerland
