= Leutwil =

- Municipality
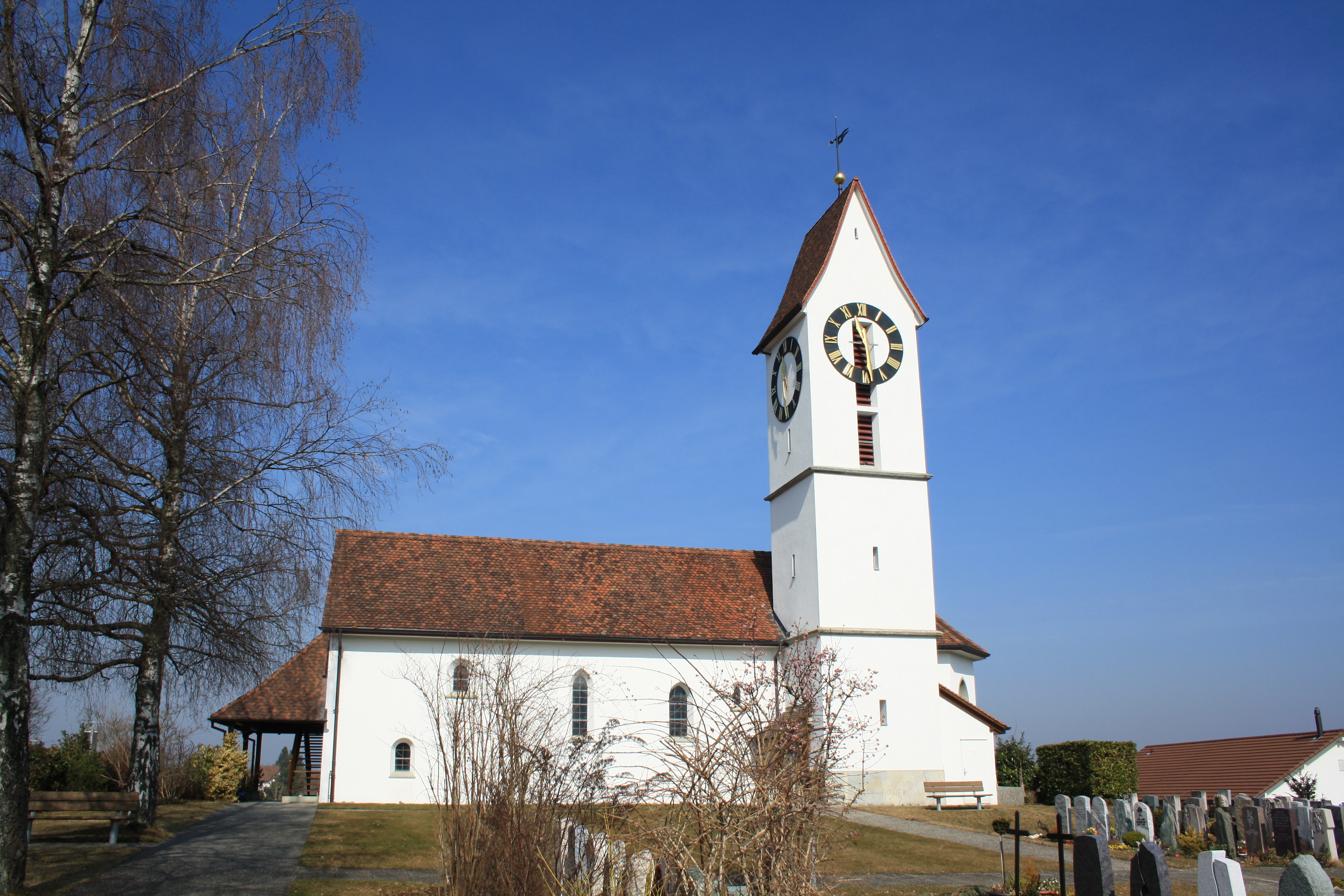

- Flag Coat of arms
- Location of Leutwil
- Location within Switzerland Location within Canton of Aargau
- Coordinates: 47°19′N 8°11′E
- Country: Switzerland
- Canton: Aargau
- District: Kulm

Area
  - Total: 3.75 km^{2} (1.45 sq mi)
- Elevation: 613 m (2,011 ft)

Population (December 2006)
  - Total: 718
  - Density: 191/km^{2} (496/sq mi)
- Time zone: UTC+01:00 (CET)
  - Summer (DST): UTC+02:00 (CEST)
- Postal code: 5725
- SFOS number: 4138
- ISO 3166 code: CH-AG
- Surrounded by: Birrwil, Boniswil, Dürrenäsch, Hallwil, Zetzwil
- Website: www.leutwil.ch

Leutwil is a municipality in the district of Kulm in the canton of Aargau in Switzerland.

== History ==
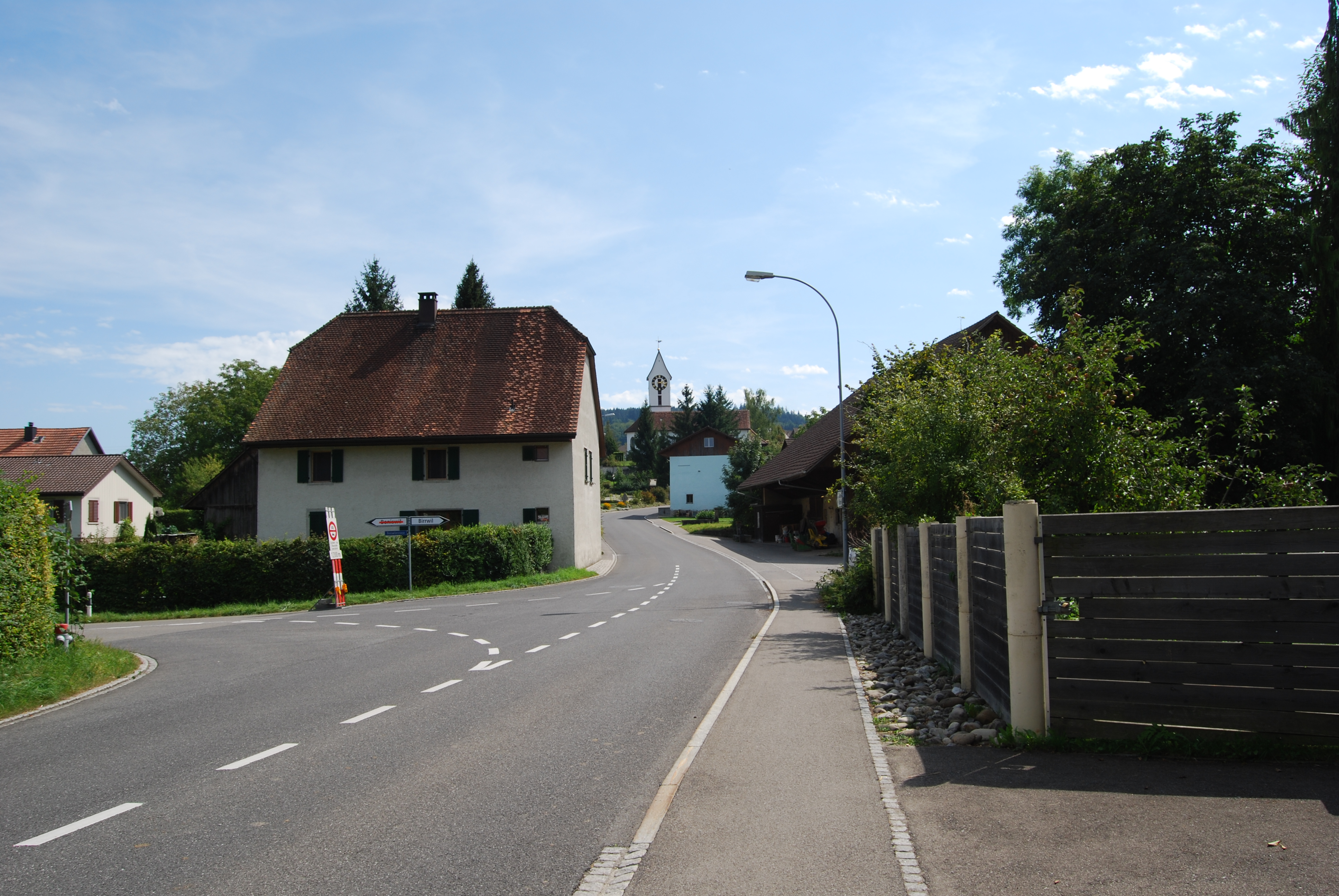

Leutwil is first mentioned in 1273 as Lutwile. The rights to high justice in the village in the late 13th and 14th century was held by the Habsburgs. The rights to low justice was held by the lords of Trostburg, and later those of Reinach and Hallwyl. Between 1415 and 1798 the municipality belonged to the city of Bern as part of the bailiwick of Lenzburg.

The village church was first mentioned in 1273. In the 13th century, the first frescoes were painted in the church. Additional paintings were added during two periods in the 14th and 15th centuries. In 1528, the Protestant Reformation entered the village, and the church transitioned to the new religion. In 1616, the Leutwil-Dürrenäsch parish was founded.

There are two monuments that remember the plague epidemic that hit the village in 1629.

In the 18th and 19th century cotton processing and agriculture provided most of the income to the village. Then, from the late 19th century until 1990, the major economic activity was the cigar industry. The municipality has bus links to Boniswil, Seengen, Dürrenäsch and Teufenthal.

== Geography ==
Aerial view (1953)

Leutwil is located in the Kulm district, on a northern spur of the Reinacher Homberg mountain. The municipality consists of the village of Leutwil itself, and the hamlet of Wampfle. While the rest of the municipality is in the Seetal valley, Wampfle is in the Wynental valley.

Leutwil has an area, as of 2009, of 3.75 square kilometers (1.45 sq mi). Of this area, 1.9 square kilometers (0.73 sq mi) or 50.7% is used for agricultural purposes, while 1.45 square kilometers (0.56 sq mi) or 38.7% is forested. Of the rest of the land, 0.41 square kilometers (0.16 sq mi) or 10.9% is settled (buildings or roads).

Of the built up area, housing and buildings made up 7.2% and transportation infrastructure made up 2.9%. 37.1% of the total land area is heavily forested and 1.6% is covered with orchards or small clusters of trees. Of the agricultural land, 28.3% is used for growing crops and 17.3% is pastures, while 5.1% is used for orchards or vine crops.

== Coat of arms ==
The blazon of the municipal coat of arms is Azure a Bell Argent.

== Demographics ==
Leutwil has a population (as of December 2020) of 745 As of June 2009, 8.5% of the population are foreign nationals. Over the last 10 years (1997–2007) the population has changed at a rate of 12.8%. Most of the population (as of 2000) speaks German (96.7%), with English being second most common (1.1%) and Spanish being third (0.5%).

The age distribution, as of 2008, in Leutwil is; 77 children or 10.5% of the population are between 0 and 9 years old and 100 teenagers or 13.6% are between 10 and 19. Of the adult population, 62 people or 8.4% of the population are between 20 and 29 years old. 114 people or 15.5% are between 30 and 39, 135 people or 18.4% are between 40 and 49, and 96 people or 13.1% are between 50 and 59. The senior population distribution is 77 people or 10.5% of the population are between 60 and 69 years old, 52 people or 7.1% are between 70 and 79, there are 20 people or 2.7% who are between 80 and 89, and there are 2 people or 0.3% who are 90 and older.

As of 2000 the average number of residents per living room was 0.56 which is about equal to the cantonal average of 0.57 per room. In this case, a room is defined as space of a housing unit of at least 4 m^{2} (43 sq ft) as normal bedrooms, dining rooms, living rooms, kitchens and habitable cellars and attics. About 70% of the total households were owner occupied, or in other words did not pay rent (though they may have a mortgage or a rent-to-own agreement).

As of 2000, there were 11 homes with 1 or 2 persons in the household, 123 homes with 3 or 4 persons in the household, and 109 homes with 5 or more persons in the household. The average number of people per household was 2.59 individuals. As of 2000, there were 253 private households (homes and apartments) in the municipality, and an average of 2.6 persons per household. In 2008 there were 159 single family homes (or 52.5% of the total) out of a total of 303 homes and apartments. There were a total of 3 empty apartments for a 1.0% vacancy rate. As of 2007, the construction rate of new housing units was 4.2 new units per 1000 residents.

In the 2007 federal election the most popular party was the SVP which received 55.4% of the vote. The next three most popular parties were the FDP (12.9%), the SP (9.4%) and the CSP (7.1%).

The entire Swiss population is generally well educated. In Leutwil about 74.1% of the population (between age 25 and 64) have completed either non-mandatory upper secondary education or additional higher education (either university or a Fachhochschule). Of the school age population (in the 2008/2009 school year), there are 56 students attending primary school in the municipality.

The historical population is given in the following table:

Historical population
Year	Pop.	±%
1653	225	—
1850	790	+251.1%
1900	599	−24.2%
1950	533	−11.0%
2000	662	+24.2%

== Heritage sites of national significance ==
The Baumann farm house at Zopfweg 2 is listed as a Swiss heritage site of national significance.

== Economy ==
As of 2007, Leutwil had an unemployment rate of 1%. As of 2005, there were 43 people employed in the primary economic sector and about 15 businesses involved in this sector. 108 people are employed in the secondary sector and there are 9 businesses in this sector. 48 people are employed in the tertiary sector, with 16 businesses in this sector.

In 2000 there were 317 workers who lived in the municipality. Of these, 251 or about 79.2% of the residents worked outside Leutwil while 95 people commuted into the municipality for work. There were a total of 161 jobs (of at least 6 hours per week) in the municipality. Of the working population, 10.1% used public transportation to get to work, and 57.9% used a private car.

== Religion ==
From the 2000 census, 91 or 13.7% were Roman Catholic, while 479 or 72.4% belonged to the Swiss Reformed Church.

== Notable people ==
- Christian Baumann, (born 1995), artistic gymnast
