= Johannes Müller Argoviensis =

Swiss botanist (1828–1896)

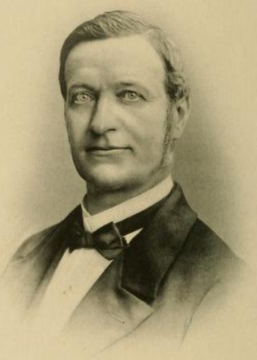
- Born: 9 May 1828; Teufenthal, Aargau
- Died: 28 January 1896 (aged 67); Geneva
- Scientific career
- Fields: botanist

Johann Müller (9 May 1828 – 28 January 1896) was a Swiss botanist who was a specialist in lichens. He published under the name Johannes Müller Argoviensis to distinguish himself from other naturalists with similar names.

== Biography ==
Müller was born into a farming family on 9 May 1828 in Teufenthal, Switzerland. He received his education at the Reinach gymnasium and then entered the Aargau industrial school, where he was passionate about botany and mathematics. Encouraged by Hans Schinz he built a herbarium of the flora of Aargau. In 1850 and 1851 he studied in Geneva and came into contact with prominent botanists Edmond Boissier and Alphonse Pyrame de Candolle (who offered him the vacant post of curator at his herbarium).

In the spring of 1851 he collected in southern France with Jean Étienne Duby. The herbarium specimens from this trip were later sent to several herbaria in Europe. The following year, Müller travelled with Boissier to collect plants in the Alps of Savoy, the valley of Aoste, and Piedmont.

The Swiss Society of Natural Sciences published his first work in 1857, Monographie de la famille des Résédacées, for which he received the Candolle prize and earned a Doctorate of Philosophy from the University of Zurich. He then published works on Euphorbiaceae, Characeae, Apocynaceae, mosses and fungi. His annotated catalog of lichens, published in 1862, was considered a standard work in its day. In 1867 he issued the last delivery of the exsiccata series Die Flechten Europas in getrockneten mikroskopisch untersuchten Exemplaren mit Beschreibung und Abbildung ihrer Sporen. Later on he distributed two other series: Graphideae Cubenses a cl. C. Wright lectae et a cl. W. Nylander determinatae and Verr. Cub..

He was appointed instructor in Geneva in 1868, in charge of teaching medical and pharmaceutical botany at the Geneva Academy from 1871. He held the chair in 1876 and retired in 1889 for health reasons. Afterwards he served as curator of the Delessert herbarium and director of the Geneva Botanical Garden until his death on 28 January 1896.

He served as president of the Botanical Society of Geneva from 1878 to 1882. He was a member of the Linnean Society of London, the German Botanical Society, the Royal Botanical Society of Belgium, and other academic societies.

Müller was a prolific author of new fungal and lichen species, having formally described 2309 in his career.

== Honors ==
The genus Muellerargia of the family Cucurbitaceae was named in his honor by Alfred Cogniaux, as well as the following species, Psychotria argoviensis Steyerm.(in the Rubiaceae family)

== See also ==
- Category:Taxa named by Johannes Müller Argoviensis
