= Dürrenäsch =

- Municipality
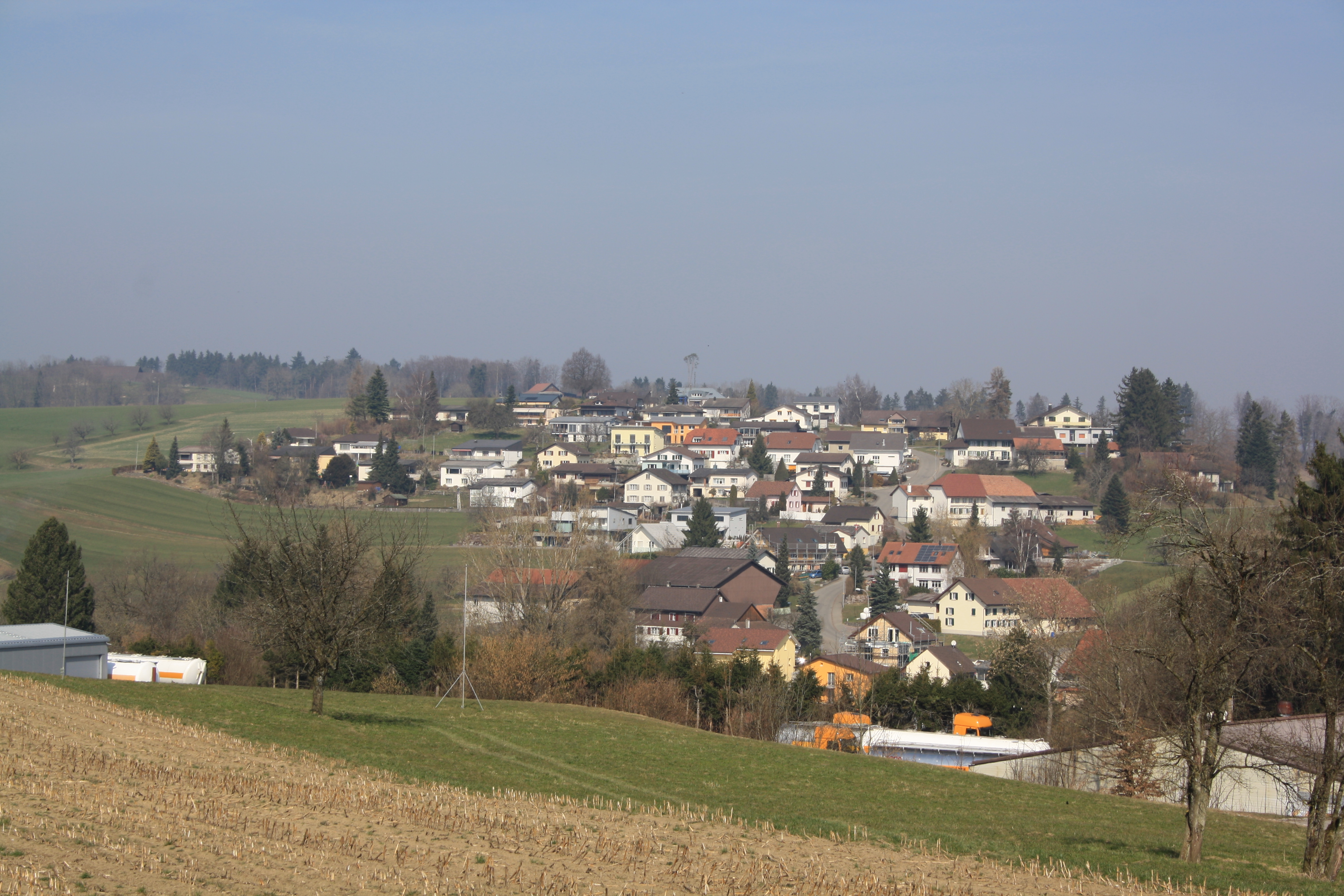

- Flag Coat of arms
- Location of Dürrenäsch
- Location within Switzerland Location within Canton of Aargau
- Coordinates: 47°19′N 8°9′E
- Country: Switzerland
- Canton: Aargau
- District: Kulm

Area
  - Total: 5.91 km^{2} (2.28 sq mi)
- Elevation: 562 m (1,844 ft)

Population (December 2006)
  - Total: 1,121
  - Density: 190/km^{2} (491/sq mi)
- Time zone: UTC+01:00 (CET)
  - Summer (DST): UTC+02:00 (CEST)
- Postal code: 5724
- SFOS number: 4134
- ISO 3166 code: CH-AG
- Surrounded by: Hallwil, Leutwil, Oberkulm, Seon, Teufenthal, Unterkulm, Zetzwil
- Website: www.duerrenaesch.ch

Dürrenäsch is a municipality in the district of Kulm in the canton of Aargau in Switzerland.

Aerial view (1964)

== History ==
While Dürrenäsch is first mentioned in 924 as Aske inferior, there are traces of earlier, nearby settlements. Several, individual Hallstatt era items were found on the castle hill. Roman era artifacts have been discovered on the Loren and Alamanni graves were found on the Lindhügel.

During the High Middle Ages Dürrenäsch was ruled by Lenzburg. In 1173 it came under the power of the Counts of Kyburg. A century later, in 1273, it was inherited by the Habsburgs. Under the Habsburgs it was ruled by their vassals, the Lords of Trostberg, Reinach and Hallwyl. From 1415 until 1798 it was under the control of the city of Bern and was part of the district (German: Oberamt) of Lenzburg. In 1433 Bern bought the rights to high and low justice, in the village, from the Austrians.

Until 1614 the village was part of the Kulm parish and since then it has belonged to the Leutwil parish.

Particularly tragic events were the big fire in the village in 1782 and in 1963, the crash of Swissair Flight 306 on the outskirts of Dürrenäsch (killing all 80 on board).

In addition to the still common agriculture industry, several other industries developed in the 18th to 19th century. Initially, cotton weaving and straw plaiting developed in the village. Then, between 1852 and 1935 the silk industry developed and between 1863 and 1950 the cigar industry was in the village. The Korkwarenfabrik (cork products factory) opened in 1878. Between 1952 and 1954 it was rebuilt and went into production of new types of insulation and plastics as the Sagex factory.

== Geography ==
Dürrenäsch is located in the Kulm district, in a saddle between the Seetal and Wynental valleys.

The municipality has an area, as of 2009, of 5.91 square kilometers (2.28 sq mi). Of this area, 2.93 square kilometers (1.13 sq mi) or 49.6% is used for agricultural purposes, while 2.2 square kilometers (0.85 sq mi) or 37.2% is forested. Of the rest of the land, 0.76 square kilometers (0.29 sq mi) or 12.9% is settled (buildings or roads) and 0.01 km^{2} (2.5 acres) or 0.2% is unproductive land.

Of the built up area, industrial buildings made up 1.5% of the total area while housing and buildings made up 7.4% and transportation infrastructure made up 3.4%. 36.4% of the total land area is heavily forested. Of the agricultural land, 26.2% is used for growing crops and 17.4% is pastures, while 5.9% is used for orchards or vine crops.

== Coat of arms ==
The blazon of the municipal coat of arms is Or on Coupeaux Vert a Lion Gules statant rampant holding a Stump Sable ragully couped.

== Demographics ==
Dürrenäsch has a population (as of December 2020) of 1,329. As of June 2009, 9.9% of the population are foreign nationals. Over the last 10 years (1997–2007) the population has changed at a rate of -1.3%. Most of the population (as of 2000) speaks German (90.7%), with Turkish being second most common ( 3.3%) and Serbo-Croatian being third ( 2.0%).

The historical population is given in the following table:

Historical population
Year	Pop.	±%
1764	443	—
1850	1,112	+151.0%
1900	766	−31.1%
1950	878	+14.6%
2000	1,115	+27.0%

The age distribution, as of 2008, in Dürrenäsch is; 131 children or 11.5% of the population are between 0 and 9 years old and 132 teenagers or 11.6% are between 10 and 19. Of the adult population, 125 people or 11.0% of the population are between 20 and 29 years old. 157 people or 13.8% are between 30 and 39, 193 people or 17.0% are between 40 and 49, and 165 people or 14.5% are between 50 and 59. The senior population distribution is 121 people or 10.6% of the population are between 60 and 69 years old, 71 people or 6.2% are between 70 and 79, there are 36 people or 3.2% who are between 80 and 89, and there are 6 people or 0.5% who are 90 and older.

As of 2000 the average number of residents per living room was 0.59 which is about equal to the cantonal average of 0.57 per room. In this case, a room is defined as space of a housing unit of at least 4 m^{2} (43 sq ft) as normal bedrooms, dining rooms, living rooms, kitchens and habitable cellars and attics. About 65% of the total households were owner occupied, or in other words did not pay rent (though they may have a mortgage or a rent-to-own agreement).

As of 2000, there were 25 homes with 1 or 2 persons in the household, 155 homes with 3 or 4 persons in the household, and 206 homes with 5 or more persons in the household. The average number of people per household was 2.77 individuals. As of 2000, there were 389 private households (homes and apartments) in the municipality, and an average of 2.8 persons per household. In 2008 there were 263 single family homes (or 54.5% of the total) out of a total of 483 homes and apartments. There were a total of 3 empty apartments for a 0.6% vacancy rate. As of 2007, the construction rate of new housing units was 3.6 new units per 1000 residents.

In the 2007 federal election the most popular party was the SVP which received 43.2% of the vote. The next three most popular parties were the CSP (18%), the FDP (11.6%) and the SP (9%).

The entire Swiss population is generally well educated. In Dürrenäsch about 71% of the population (between age 25 and 64) have completed either non-mandatory upper secondary education or additional higher education (either university or a Fachhochschule). Of the school age population (in the 2008/2009 school year), there are 83 students attending primary school in the municipality.

== Economy ==
As of 2007, Dürrenäsch had an unemployment rate of 1.06%. As of 2005, there were 55 people employed in the primary economic sector and about 22 businesses involved in this sector. 158 people are employed in the secondary sector and there are 12 businesses in this sector. 328 people are employed in the tertiary sector, with 30 businesses in this sector.

In 2000 there were 588 workers who lived in the municipality. Of these, 406 or about 69.0% of the residents worked outside Dürrenäsch while 220 people commuted into the municipality for work. There were a total of 402 jobs (of at least 6 hours per week) in the municipality. Of the working population, 8.3% used public transportation to get to work, and 55.6% used a private car.

== Religion ==
From the 2000 census, 120 or 10.8% were Roman Catholic, while 734 or 65.8% belonged to the Swiss Reformed Church. Of the rest of the population, there were 5 individuals (or about 0.45% of the population) who belonged to the Christian Catholic faith.
