= Kulm District =

Coordinates: 47°18′N 8°6′E

Kulm District Bezirk Kulm
- District
- Country: Switzerland
- Canton: Aargau
- Capital: Unterkulm

Area
  - Total: 101.35 km^{2} (39.13 sq mi)

Population (2020)
  - Total: 42,878
  - Density: 423.07/km^{2} (1,095.7/sq mi)
- Time zone: UTC+1 (CET)
  - Summer (DST): UTC+2 (CEST)
- Municipalities: 16

Kulm District is a district in the canton of Aargau, Switzerland. It is located west of Lake Hallwil and covers parts of the Wyna and Suhre valleys. The principal town is Unterkulm; the largest municipality is Reinach. The district contains 16 municipalities, is 101.35 km^{2} in area and has a population of 42,878 (as of 31 December 2020).

== Geography ==
Kulm district has an area, as of 2009, of 101.37 square kilometers (39.14 sq mi). Of this area, 50.46 km^{2} (19.48 sq mi) or 49.8% is used for agricultural purposes, while 32.21 km^{2} (12.44 sq mi) or 31.8% is forested. Of the rest of the land, 14.4 km^{2} (5.6 sq mi) or 14.2% is settled (buildings or roads).

== Demographics ==
The Kulm district has a population (as of December 2020) of 42,878. As of June 2009, 22.6% of the population are foreign nationals.

== Economy ==
In 2000 there were 18,062 workers who lived in the municipality. Of these, 12,740 or about 70.5% of the residents worked outside the district while 7,159 people commuted into the district for work. There were a total of 12,481 jobs (of at least 6 hours per week) in the district.

== Religion ==
From the 2000 census, 8,159 or 22.7% were Roman Catholic, while 19,512 or 54.3% belonged to the Swiss Reformed Church. Of the rest of the population, there were 30 individuals (or about 0.08% of the population) who belonged to the Christian Catholic faith.

== Education ==
Of the school age population (in the 2008/2009 school year), there are 2,711 students attending primary school, there are 1,174 students attending secondary school, there are 755 students attending tertiary or university level schooling, and there are 12 students who are seeking a job after school in the municipality.

== Municipalities ==
Coat of arms	Municipality name	Population (31 December 2020)	Area in km^{2}
Beinwil am See	Beinwil am See	3,418	5.78
Birrwil	Birrwil	1,185	5.53
Dürrenäsch	Dürrenäsch	1,329	5.91
Gontenschwil	Gontenschwil	2,130	9.74
Holziken	Holziken	1,543	2.86
Leimbach	Leimbach	489	1.14
Leutwil	Leutwil	745	3.75
Menziken	Menziken	6,518	7.32
Oberkulm	Oberkulm	2,776	9.40
Reinach	Reinach	8,874	9.48
Schlossrued	Schlossrued	822	7.25
Schmiedrued	Schmiedrued	1,160	8.65
Schöftland	Schöftland	4,468	6.28
Teufenthal	Teufenthal	1,682	3.57
Unterkulm	Unterkulm	3,343	8.88
Zetzwil	Zetzwil	1,363	5.81

=== Mergers ===
The following changes to the district's municipalities have occurred since 2000:

- On 1 January 2023 the municipality of Burg merged into Menziken.
