= Unterkulm =

- Municipality
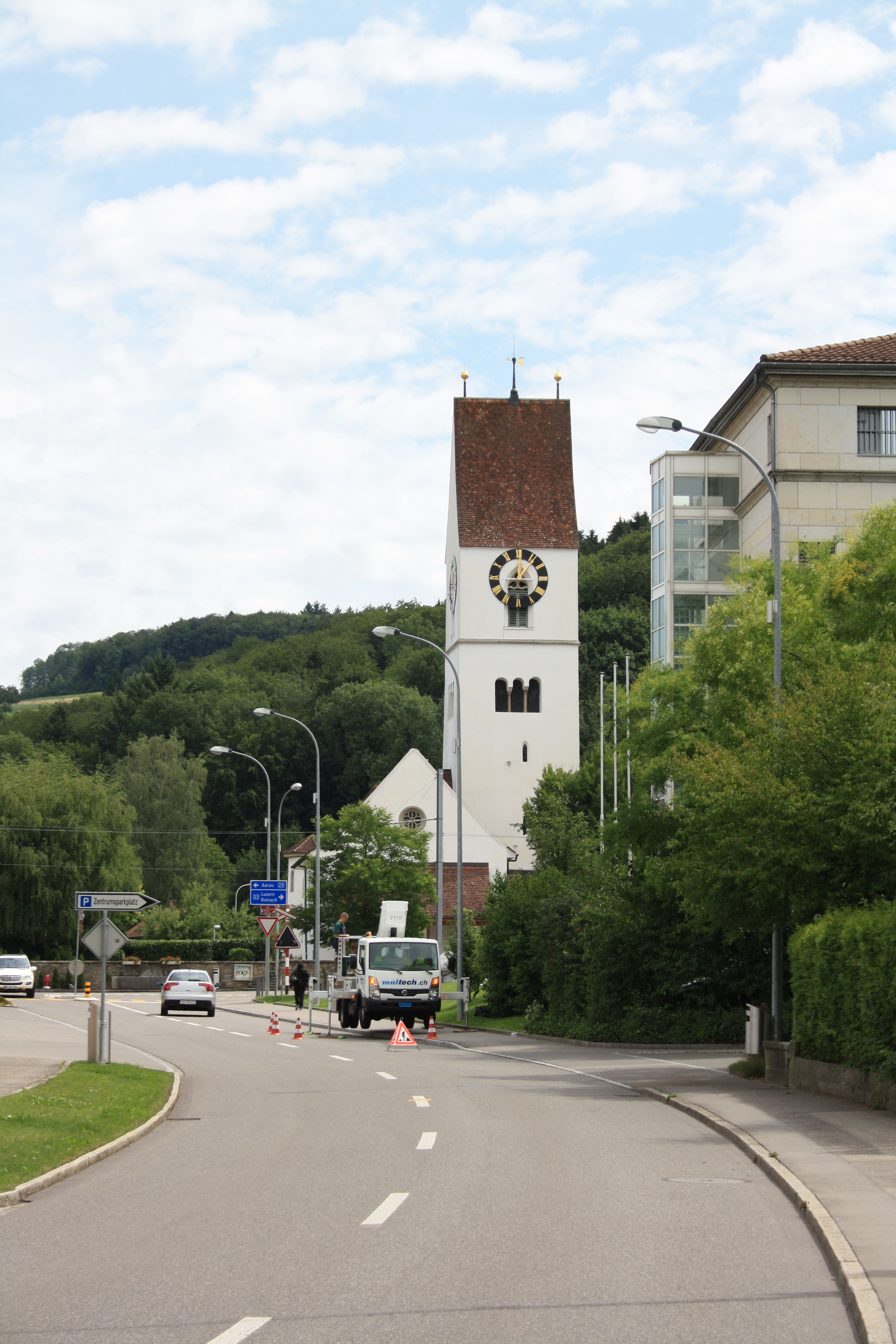

- Flag Coat of arms
- Location of Unterkulm
- Location within Switzerland Location within Canton of Aargau
- Coordinates: 47°19′N 8°7′E
- Country: Switzerland
- Canton: Aargau
- District: Kulm

Area
  - Total: 8.89 km^{2} (3.43 sq mi)
- Elevation: 466 m (1,529 ft)

Population (December 2006)
  - Total: 2,898
  - Density: 326/km^{2} (844/sq mi)
- Time zone: UTC+01:00 (CET)
  - Summer (DST): UTC+02:00 (CEST)
- Postal code: 5726
- SFOS number: 4146
- ISO 3166 code: CH-AG
- Surrounded by: Dürrenäsch, Gränichen, Hirschthal, Muhen, Oberkulm, Schlossrued, Schöftland, Teufenthal
- Website: www.unterkulm.ch

Unterkulm is a municipality in the district of Kulm in the canton of Aargau in Switzerland.

== History ==
Aerial view (1962)

Both Roman ruins near the church and late-Roman coins at Sonnenhof indicate that the area near Unterkulm was settled during the Roman era. However, Unterkulm is first mentioned in 1045 as Chulenbare though this is for both Unterkulm and Oberkulm. In 1303 it was mentioned as ze Nideren-Kulme which is the first mention of Unterkulm individually. Until 1566 Unter- and Oberkulm formed a tithe district (German: Zehntbezirk), though their political separation was probably earlier. In the 12th and 13th centuries the area was ruled by the Lenzburg family, then the Kyburgs and finally the Habsburgs. By 1300 parts of the village were also owned by the monasteries of Schänis, Beromünster and Engelberg as well as local aristocratic families and the Dukes of Austria. In the 14th and 15th centuries the Knights Hospitaller houses at Klingnau and Biberstein, and the collegiate church at Zofingen also became landholders in Unterkulm. After the conquest by Bern in 1415, Unterkulm remained part of the Court on Kulm in the District (German: Oberamt) of Lenzburg until 1798. During the Helvetic Republic (1798–1803) it was a district capital.

The village church was built around 1045 and was dedicated to Saint Martin of Tours. A major fresco cycle was added in the early 14th century. Its tower houses the oldest clock tower in service (1530), built by the Winterthur watchmaker Laurentz Liechti. In 1528 the Protestant Reformation was introduced to the parish of Kulm. The parish consisted of Unterkulm, Oberkulm, Teufenthal and Dürrenäsch, though Dürrenäsch left the parish in 1614. The catholic chapel of Unterkulm is part of the parish of Menziken-Reinach and since 1957 has its own church.

In 1565 a school is first mentioned in the village. Towards the middle of the 18th century, in addition to agriculture, cotton spinning and weaving began in the Unterkulm. In the 1780s, out of about 1,000 residents, about 280 people worked in cotton processing. Starting around 1800 the traditional three-field agriculture began to decline, though the dairy industry replaced crop production. In 1893 a dairy company was established in the village. In 1854, a ribbon factory opened and in 1874 a music box factory opened, though that was replaced in 1897 by a now major fittings factory.

== Geography ==
Unterkulm has an area, as of 2009, of 8.89 square kilometers (3.43 sq mi). Of this area, 4.15 square kilometers (1.60 sq mi) or 46.7% is used for agricultural purposes, while 3.49 square kilometers (1.35 sq mi) or 39.3% is forested. Of the rest of the land, 1.26 square kilometers (0.49 sq mi) or 14.2% is settled (buildings or roads), 0.02 km^{2} (4.9 acres) or 0.2% is either rivers or lakes.

Of the built up area, industrial buildings made up 1.2% of the total area while housing and buildings made up 7.8% and transportation infrastructure made up 4.2%. 37.9% of the total land area is heavily forested and 1.3% is covered with orchards or small clusters of trees. Of the agricultural land, 19.9% is used for growing crops and 23.8% is pastures, while 2.9% is used for orchards or vine crops. All the water in the municipality is in rivers and streams.

The municipality is the capital of the Kulm district and is located in the mid-Wynental. Since 1818 it has also been a market town. It consists of three former hamlets of Wannenhof, Zinsental and Kabishof (formerly Wolfsbüel).

== Coat of arms ==
The blazon of the municipal coat of arms is Tierced per fess Sable Argent and Azure.

== Demographics ==
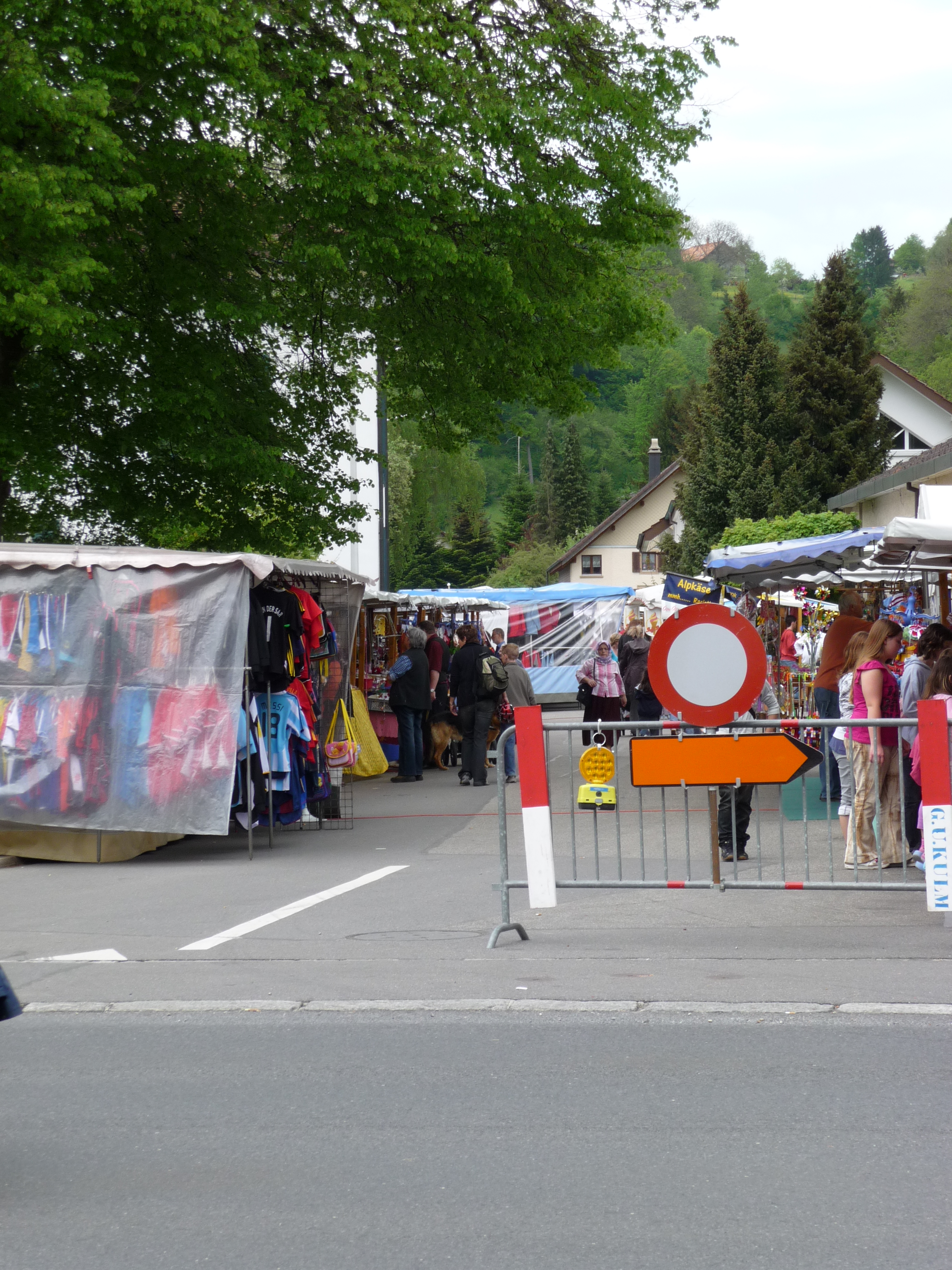
Street market in Unterkulm

Unterkulm has a population (as of December 2020) of 3,343. As of June 2009, 25.6% of the population are foreign nationals. Over the last 10 years (1997–2007) the population has changed at a rate of 5.1%. Most of the population (as of 2000) speaks German (84.2%), with Serbo-Croatian being second most common ( 5.5%) and Turkish being third ( 5.0%).

The age distribution, as of 2008, in Unterkulm is; 270 children or 9.3% of the population are between 0 and 9 years old and 407 teenagers or 14.0% are between 10 and 19. Of the adult population, 365 people or 12.6% of the population are between 20 and 29 years old. 344 people or 11.8% are between 30 and 39, 466 people or 16.1% are between 40 and 49, and 419 people or 14.4% are between 50 and 59. The senior population distribution is 322 people or 11.1% of the population are between 60 and 69 years old, 198 people or 6.8% are between 70 and 79, there are 95 people or 3.3% who are between 80 and 89, and there are 17 people or 0.6% who are 90 and older.

As of 2000, there were 60 homes with 1 or 2 persons in the household, 529 homes with 3 or 4 persons in the household, and 429 homes with 5 or more persons in the household. The average number of people per household was 2.54 individuals. As of 2000, there were 1,050 private households (homes and apartments) in the municipality, and an average of 2.5 persons per household. In 2008 there were 505 single family homes (or 42.0% of the total) out of a total of 1,202 homes and apartments. There were a total of 14 empty apartments for a 1.2% vacancy rate. As of 2007, the construction rate of new housing units was 0.7 new units per 1000 residents.

In the 2007 federal election the most popular party was the SVP which received 44% of the vote. The next three most popular parties were the SP (15.6%), the FDP (14.4%) and the Green Party (6.3%).

In Unterkulm about 61.9% of the population (between age 25 and 64) have completed either non-mandatory upper secondary education or additional higher education (either university or a Fachhochschule). Of the school age population (in the 2008/2009 school year), there are 213 students attending primary school, there are 75 students attending secondary school, there are 189 students attending tertiary or university level schooling, and there are 12 students who are seeking a job after school in the municipality.

The historical population is given in the following table:

Historical population
Year	Pop.	±%
1764	811	—
1850	1,730	+113.3%
1888	1,424	−17.7%
1900	1,448	+1.7%
1950	2,164	+49.4%
1990	2,565	+18.5%

== Heritage sites of national significance ==
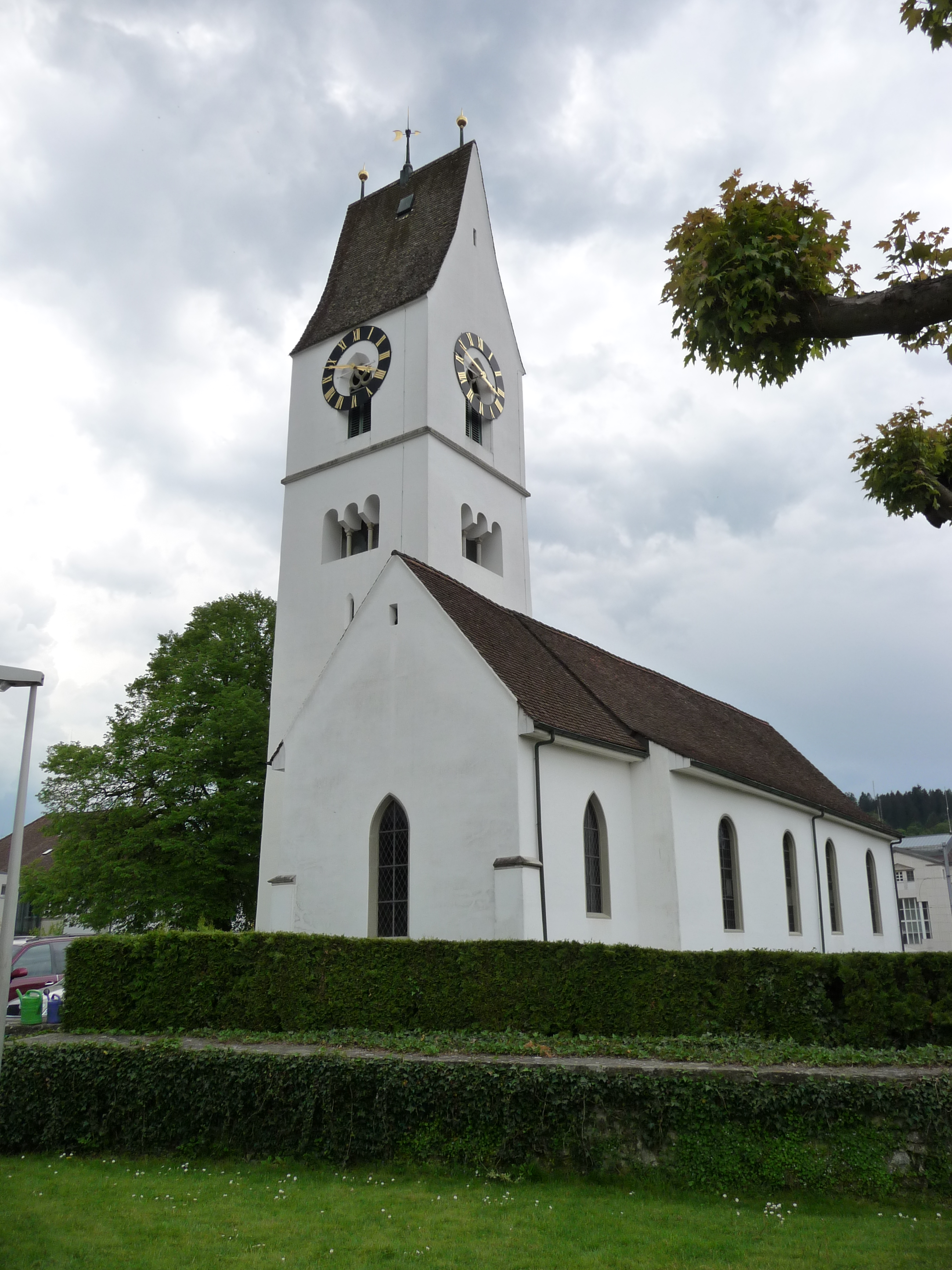
Church in Unterkulm

The Reformed Church on Hauptstrasse is listed as a Swiss heritage site of national significance.

== Economy ==
As of 2007, Unterkulm had an unemployment rate of 2.6%. As of 2005, there were 119 people employed in the primary economic sector and about 44 businesses involved in this sector. 585 people are employed in the secondary sector and there are 28 businesses in this sector. 426 people are employed in the tertiary sector, with 80 businesses in this sector.

In 2000 there were 1,382 workers who lived in the municipality. Of these, 992 or about 71.8% of the residents worked outside Unterkulm while 639 people commuted into the municipality for work. There were a total of 1,029 jobs (of at least 6 hours per week) in the municipality. Of the working population, 15.8% used public transportation to get to work, and 45.4% used a private car.

== Religion ==
From the 2000 census, 444 or 16.5% were Roman Catholic, while 1,440 or 53.5% belonged to the Swiss Reformed Church. Of the rest of the population, there were 2 individuals (or about 0.07% of the population) who belonged to the Christian Catholic faith.
