= Burg, Aargau =

Burg
- Former municipality
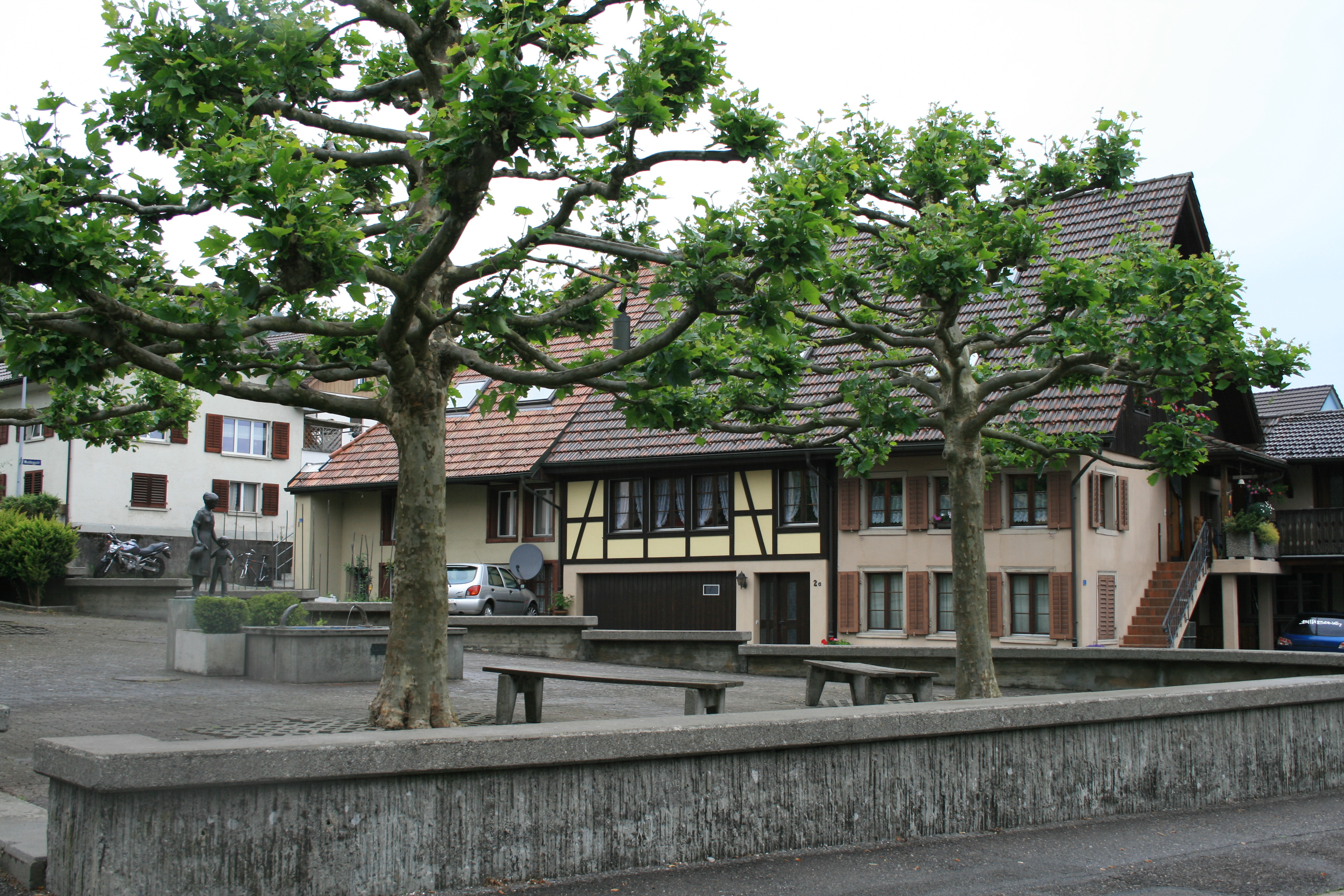

- Flag Coat of arms
- Location of Burg
- Location within Switzerland Location within Canton of Aargau
- Coordinates: 47°14′N 8°11′E
- Country: Switzerland
- Canton: Aargau
- District: Kulm

Area
  - Total: 0.94 km^{2} (0.36 sq mi)
- Elevation: 622 m (2,041 ft)

Population (December 2020)
  - Total: 1,033
  - Density: 1,100/km^{2} (2,800/sq mi)
- Time zone: UTC+01:00 (CET)
  - Summer (DST): UTC+02:00 (CEST)
- Postal code: 5736
- SFOS number: 4133
- ISO 3166 code: CH-AG
- Surrounded by: Menziken, Rickenbach (LU)
- Website: www.burg-ag.ch

Burg (German pronunciation: [bʊʁk]) is a former municipality in the district of Kulm in the canton of Aargau in Switzerland. On 1 January 2023 the former municipality of Burg merged to form the municipality of Menziken.

== History ==
Aerial view by Walter Mittelholzer (1934)

Unter-Rinach Castle, which the village name references, was probably built in the 12th century. It was the family seat of the lords of Rinach, who were vassals of the Habsburgs. The castle was destroyed in the Battle of Sempach by the Swiss and was never rebuilt.

The first reference to Burg was in 1412 when two farms that were "by the castle" (German: Burg) were mentioned. As early as 1400, the Zwing und Bann or manor rights were divided evenly between the Teutonic Order and the family of the Schultheiss of Lenzburg. From 1415 until 1798 the village was under the authority of the city of Bern. It was part of the Oberamt or district of Lenzburg, and the court of Reinach.

== Geography ==
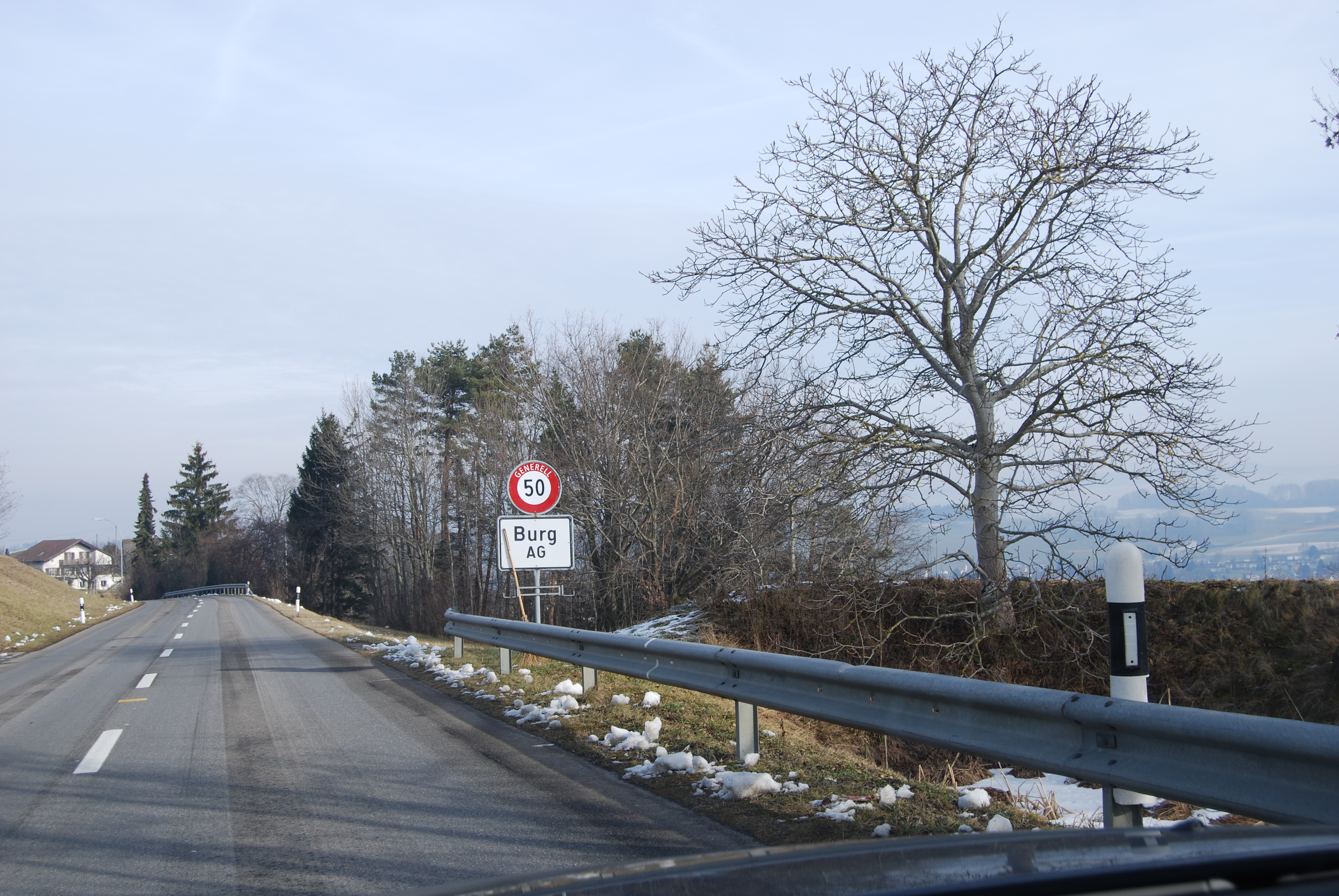
Burg, Aargau

As of 2009, Burg has an area of 0.94 square kilometers (0.36 sq mi). Of this area, 0.4 square kilometers (0.15 sq mi) or 42.6% is used for agricultural purposes, while 0.21 square kilometers (0.081 sq mi) or 22.3% is forested. Of the rest of the land, 0.31 square kilometers (0.12 sq mi) or 33.0% is settled (buildings or roads).

The settled area can be sub-divided into industrial buildings (2.1%), housing and buildings (26.6%), and transportation infrastructure (4.3%). 19.1% of the total land area is heavily forested and 3.2% is covered with orchards or small clusters of trees. Of the agricultural land, 19.1% is used for growing crops and 22.3% is pastures, while 1.1% is used for orchards or vine crops.

The municipality is located in the Kulm district, in the upper Wynental on the eastern slopes of the Stierenberg. It is nearly completely surrounded by the municipality of Menziken.

== Coat of arms ==
The blazon of the municipal coat of arms is Argent on a Base Vert a Castle Sable towered in dexter and a Pine tree Vert. The castle (German: Burg) on the flag of Burg is an example of canting.

== Demographics ==
As of December 2018, Burg has a population of 1,033 As of June 2009, 30.9% of the population are foreign nationals. Over the last 10 years (1997–2007) the population has shrunk by 8.3%. Most of the population (as of 2000) speaks German (81.8%), with Italian being second most common ( 4.8%) and Turkish being third ( 4.2%).

The age distribution as of 2008 is as follows. 85 children or 8.5% of the population are between 0 and 9 years old and 129 teenagers or 12.9% are between 10 and 19. Of the adult population, 169 people or 17.0% of the population are between 20 and 29 years old. 116 people or 11.6% are between 30 and 39, 177 people or 17.8% are between 40 and 49, and 147 people or 14.7% are between 50 and 59. The senior population distribution is 86 people or 8.6% of the population are between 60 and 69 years old, 59 people or 5.9% are between 70 and 79, there are 24 people or 2.4% who are between 80 and 89, and there are 5 people or 0.5% who are 90 and older.

As of 2000, the average number of residents per living room was 0.57, which is equal to the cantonal average. In this case, a room is defined as space of a housing unit of at least 4 m^{2} (43 sq ft) as normal bedrooms, dining rooms, living rooms, kitchens and habitable cellars and attics. About 53.3% of the total households were owner occupied, or in other words did not pay rent (though they may have a mortgage or a rent-to-own agreement).

As of 2000, there were 37 homes with 1 or 2 persons in the household, 212 homes with 3 or 4 persons in the household, and 141 homes with 5 or more persons in the household. The average number of people per household was 2.45 individuals. As of 2000, there were 401 private households (homes and apartments) in the municipality, and an average of 2.4 persons per household. In 2008 there were 206 single family homes (or 43.6% of the total) out of a total of 473 homes and apartments. There were a total of 14 empty apartments for a 3.0% vacancy rate. As of 2007, the construction rate of new housing units was 0 new units per 1000 residents.

In the 2007 federal election the most popular party was the SVP which received 38.8% of the vote. The next three most popular parties were the SP (20.6%), the FDP (14.3%) and the Green Party (8.1%).

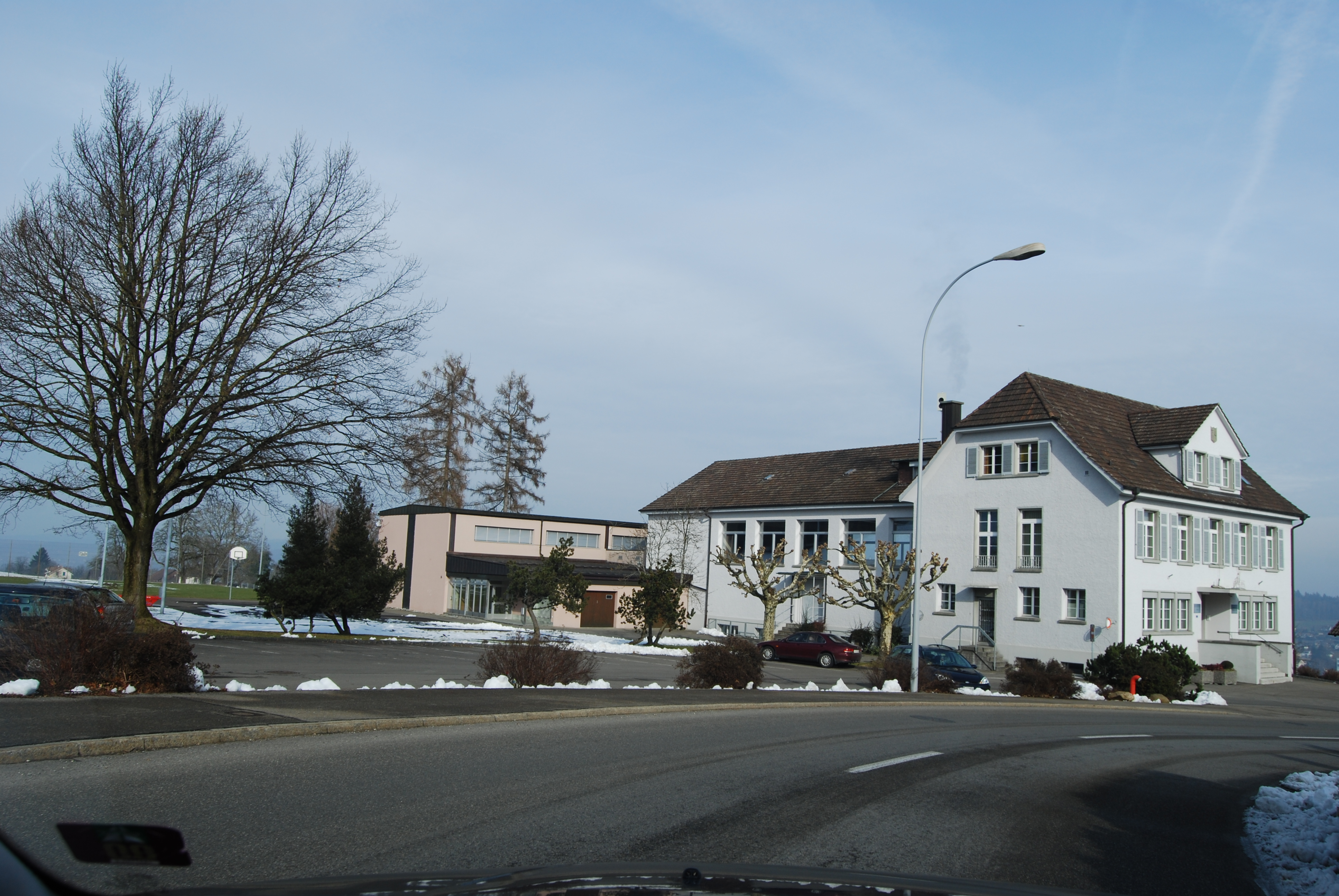
School house of Burg

The entire Swiss population is generally well educated. In Burg about 57.5% of the population (between age 25 and 64) have completed either non-mandatory upper secondary education or additional higher education (either university or a Fachhochschule). Of the school age population (in the 2008/2009 school year), there are 67 students attending primary school in the municipality.

The historical population is given in the following table:

Historical population
Year	Pop.	±%
1764	154	—
1850	463	+200.6%
1900	563	+21.6%
1950	883	+56.8%
1990	1,142	+29.3%
2000	991	−13.2%

== Economy ==
As of 2007, Burg had an unemployment rate of 2.53%. As of 2005, there were 2 businesses and 10 people employed in the primary economic sector. 8 businesses employed a total of 135 people n the secondary sector. 11 businesses employed a total of 37 people in the tertiary sector.

In 2000 there were 486 workers who lived in the municipality. Of these, 413 or about 85.0% of the residents worked outside Burg while 137 people commuted into the municipality for work. There were a total of 210 jobs (of at least 6 hours per week) in the municipality. Of the working population, 8.2% used public transportation to get to work, and 56.8% used a private car.

== Religion ==
From the 2000 census, 276 or 27.9% were Roman Catholic, while 425 or 42.9% belonged to the Swiss Reformed Church.
