= Gontenschwil =

- Municipality
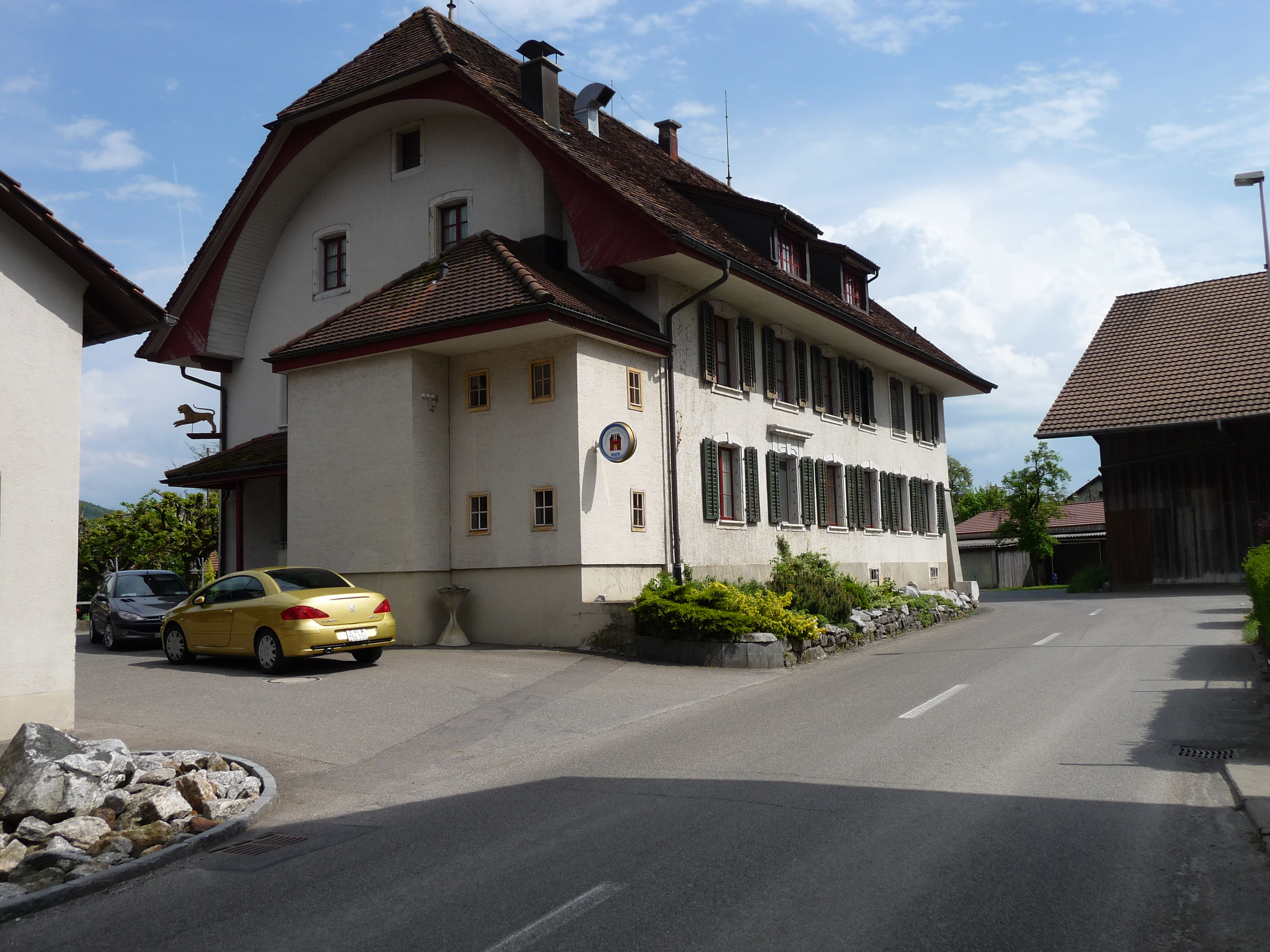

- Flag Coat of arms
- Location of Gontenschwil
- Location within Switzerland Location within Canton of Aargau
- Coordinates: 47°16′N 8°9′E
- Country: Switzerland
- Canton: Aargau
- District: Kulm

Area
  - Total: 9.74 km^{2} (3.76 sq mi)
- Elevation: 531 m (1,742 ft)

Population (December 2006)
  - Total: 2,101
  - Density: 216/km^{2} (559/sq mi)
- Time zone: UTC+01:00 (CET)
  - Summer (DST): UTC+02:00 (CEST)
- Postal code: 5728
- SFOS number: 4135
- ISO 3166 code: CH-AG
- Surrounded by: Leimbach, Oberkulm, Pfeffikon (LU), Reinach, Rickenbach (LU), Schmiedrued, Zetzwil
- Website: www.gontenschwil.ch

Gontenschwil is a municipality in the district of Kulm in the canton of Aargau in Switzerland.

Aerial view (1964)

== History ==
Gontenschwil is first mentioned in 1173 as Gundoltswilre in a grant to the monastery at Beromünster. In 1236, ownership of part of village went to Engelberg Abbey, in 1266 it transferred to the Monastery of St. Leonhard in Basel, and in 1274 to the Knights of Malta. The secular owners of the village included the Counts of Lenzburg, then in 1173 the Counts of Kyburg, in 1273 the Kyburg rights transferred to the Habsburgs. The village was ruled by the Habsburg vassals, the Counts of Reinach. By this time, the local castle is no longer mentioned. The rights to low justice remained in the hands of wealthy citizens of Gontenschwil. After the conquest of the Aargau by Bern in 1415, Gontenschwil formed its own court within the district (German: Oberamt) of Lenzburg.

The church, first mentioned in 1340, was a daughter church to the parish church in nearby Pfeffikon. After a long struggle (1488–98) between Bern and Lucerne over the Protestant Reformation, the village became an independent, Reformed parish. The currently existing church was built in 1622.

Economically, apart from agriculture, there are a number of small businesses. In 1640 the Schwarzenberg mineral water spring was discovered. This spring flourished from the 19th century until the First World War and was used until 1990 for the production of bottled water. In the 18th and 19th centuries the cotton spinning and weaving industries dominated. These large industries meant that Gontenschwil had the second largest population in the Kulm district. After the collapse of the mid-19th century due to a lack of hydroelectric power, tobacco processing partly replaced the cotton industry. In 1900, in a disused water mill, an aluminum foundry was built. This developed into the Menziken aluminum factory. Other local factories produce washing machines and foam and plastic products. The clinic for addicts has been in Hasel since 1973.

== Geography ==
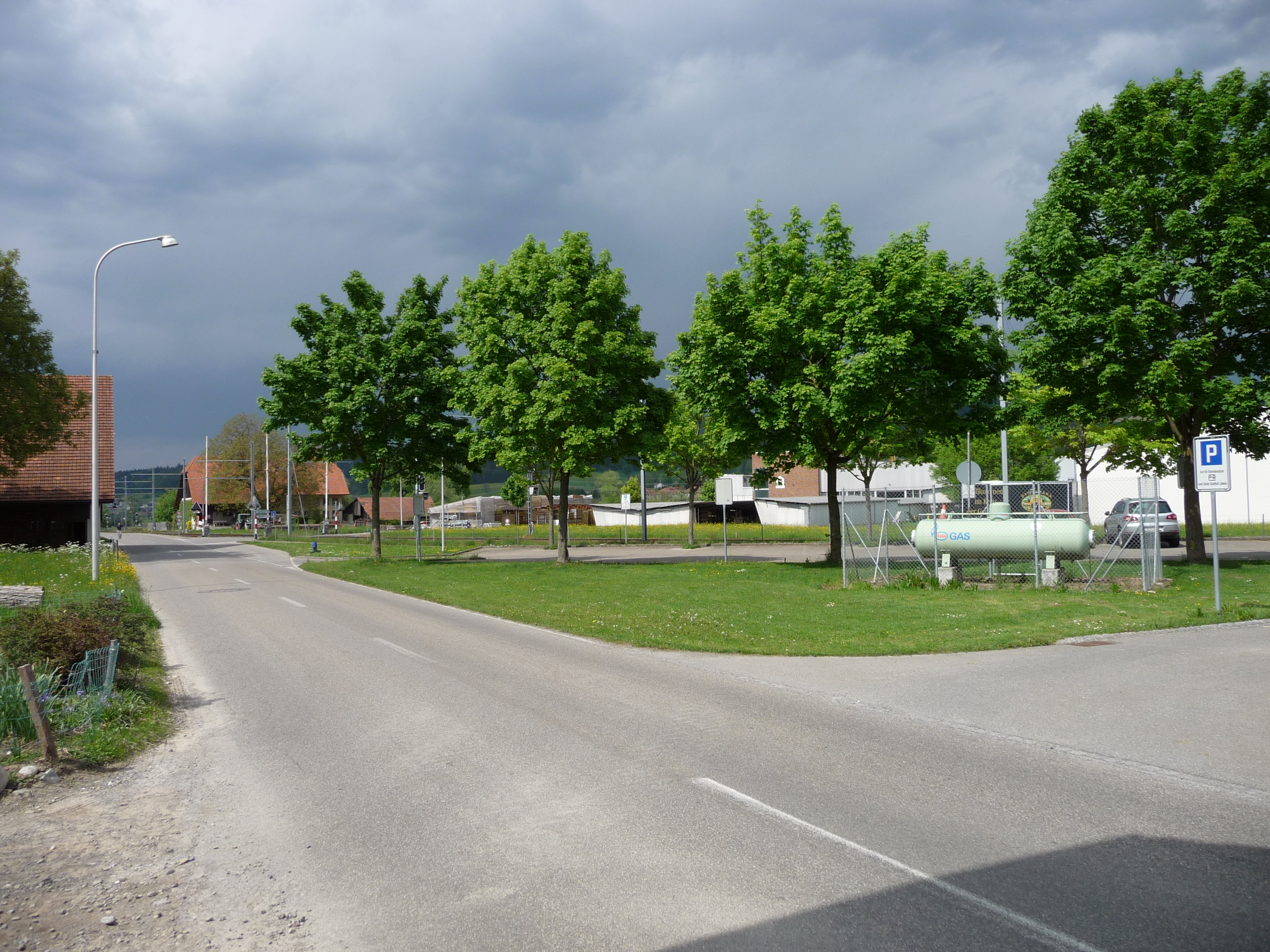
Gontenschwil

Gontenschwil has an area, as of 2009, of 9.74 square kilometers (3.76 sq mi). Of this area, 5.87 square kilometers (2.27 sq mi) or 60.3% is used for agricultural purposes, while 2.53 square kilometers (0.98 sq mi) or 26.0% is forested. Of the rest of the land, 1.32 square kilometers (0.51 sq mi) or 13.6% is settled (buildings or roads), 0.05 km^{2} (12 acres) or 0.5% is either rivers or lakes.

Of the built up area, industrial buildings made up 1.8% of the total area while housing and buildings made up 7.1% and transportation infrastructure made up 3.6%. 24.1% of the total land area is heavily forested and 1.8% is covered with orchards or small clusters of trees. Of the agricultural land, 29.4% is used for growing crops and 26.4% is pastures, while 4.5% is used for orchards or vine crops. All the water in the municipality is in rivers and streams.

The municipality is located in the Kulm district. It is located hinter der Egg or behind the left-hand side moraine that was left behind after the Reuss glacier retreated from the upper Wyne valley at the end of the last ice age. It consists of the village of Gontenschwil and the hamlets of Geisshof (that transferred from Reinach to Gontenschwil in 1901) and Hasel.

== Coat of arms ==
The blazon of the municipal coat of arms is Argent a Pine Tree issuant from a Base Vert between in chief two Hearts Gules.

== Demographics ==
Gontenschwil has a population (as of December 2020) of 2,130 As of June 2009, 15.7% of the population are foreign nationals. Over the last 10 years (1997–2007) the population has changed at a rate of -0.4%. Most of the population (as of 2000) speaks German (92.7%), with Serbo-Croatian being second most common ( 1.8%) and Albanian being third ( 1.7%).

The age distribution, as of 2008, in Gontenschwil is; 196 children or 9.3% of the population are between 0 and 9 years old and 249 teenagers or 11.8% are between 10 and 19. Of the adult population, 262 people or 12.4% of the population are between 20 and 29 years old. 245 people or 11.6% are between 30 and 39, 377 people or 17.9% are between 40 and 49, and 278 people or 13.2% are between 50 and 59. The senior population distribution is 241 people or 11.4% of the population are between 60 and 69 years old, 166 people or 7.9% are between 70 and 79, there are 75 people or 3.6% who are between 80 and 89, and there are 19 people or 0.9% who are 90 and older.

As of 2000 the average number of residents per living room was 0.54 which is about equal to the cantonal average of 0.57 per room. In this case, a room is defined as space of a housing unit of at least 4 m^{2} (43 sq ft) as normal bedrooms, dining rooms, living rooms, kitchens and habitable cellars and attics. About 57.4% of the total households were owner occupied, or in other words did not pay rent (though they may have a mortgage or a rent-to-own agreement).

As of 2000, there were 60 homes with 1 or 2 persons in the household, 387 homes with 3 or 4 persons in the household, and 347 homes with 5 or more persons in the household. The average number of people per household was 2.45 individuals. As of 2000, there were 818 private households (homes and apartments) in the municipality, and an average of 2.4 persons per household. In 2008 there were 391 single family homes (or 42.2% of the total) out of a total of 926 homes and apartments. There were a total of 17 empty apartments for a 1.8% vacancy rate. As of 2007, the construction rate of new housing units was 1 new units per 1000 residents.

In the 2007 federal election the most popular party was the SVP which received 47% of the vote. The next three most popular parties were the FDP (13%), the SP (12.7%) and the CSP (9.3%).

The entire Swiss population is generally well educated. In Gontenschwil about 70.8% of the population (between age 25–64) have completed either non-mandatory upper secondary education or additional higher education (either university or a Fachhochschule). Of the school age population (in the 2008/2009 school year), there are 152 students attending primary school, there are 98 students attending secondary school in the municipality.

The historical population is given in the following table:

Historical population
Year	Pop.	±%
1653	545	—
1850	2,297	+321.5%
1900	1,646	−28.3%
1950	2,102	+27.7%
2000	2,055	−2.2%

== Heritage sites of national significance ==
The Fischerhübel house at Fischerhübel 200 is listed as a Swiss heritage site of national significance.

== Economy ==
As of 2007, Gontenschwil had an unemployment rate of 1.59%. As of 2005, there were 98 people employed in the primary economic sector and about 38 businesses involved in this sector. 458 people are employed in the secondary sector and there are 31 businesses in this sector. 378 people are employed in the tertiary sector, with 58 businesses in this sector.

In 2000 there were 998 workers who lived in the municipality. Of these, 694 or about 69.5% of the residents worked outside Gontenschwil while 467 people commuted into the municipality for work. There were a total of 771 jobs (of at least 6 hours per week) in the municipality. Of the working population, 7.8% used public transportation to get to work, and 54.1% used a private car.

== Religion ==
From the 2000 census, 327 or 15.9% were Roman Catholic, while 1,353 or 65.8% belonged to the Swiss Reformed Church. Of the rest of the population, there was 1 individual who belonged to the Christian Catholic faith.
