= Zetzwil =

- Municipality
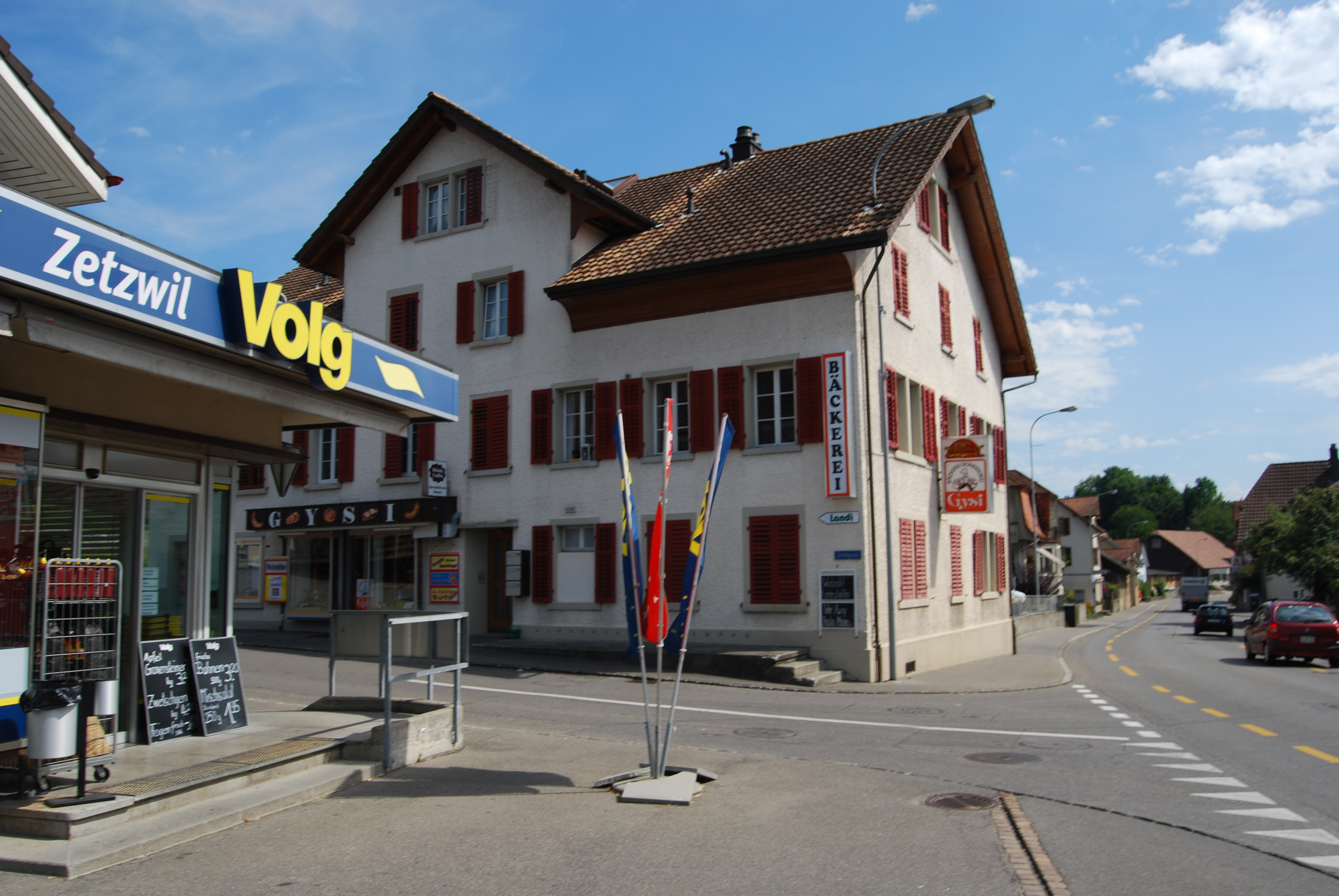

- Flag Coat of arms
- Location of Zetzwil
- Location within Switzerland Location within Canton of Aargau
- Coordinates: 47°17′N 8°9′E
- Country: Switzerland
- Canton: Aargau
- District: Kulm

Area
  - Total: 5.81 km^{2} (2.24 sq mi)
- Elevation: 522 m (1,713 ft)

Population (December 2006)
  - Total: 1,239
  - Density: 213/km^{2} (552/sq mi)
- Time zone: UTC+01:00 (CET)
  - Summer (DST): UTC+02:00 (CEST)
- Postal code: 5732
- SFOS number: 4147
- ISO 3166 code: CH-AG
- Surrounded by: Birrwil, Dürrenäsch, Gontenschwil, Leimbach, Leutwil, Oberkulm, Reinach
- Website: www.zetzwil.ch

Zetzwil is a municipality in the district of Kulm in the canton of Aargau in Switzerland.

== Geography ==
Aerial view (1964)

Zetzwil has an area, as of 2009, of 5.8 square kilometers (2.2 sq mi). Of this area, 3 square kilometers (1.2 sq mi) or 51.7% is used for agricultural purposes, while 2.18 square kilometers (0.84 sq mi) or 37.6% is forested. Of the rest of the land, 0.58 square kilometers (0.22 sq mi) or 10.0% is settled (buildings or roads) and 0.01 km^{2} (2.5 acres) or 0.2% is unproductive land.

Of the built up area, housing and buildings made up 6.9% and transportation infrastructure made up 2.4%. 35.3% of the total land area is heavily forested and 2.2% is covered with orchards or small clusters of trees. Of the agricultural land, 23.4% is used for growing crops and 22.8% is pastures, while 5.5% is used for orchards or vine crops.

== Coat of arms ==
The blazon of the municipal coat of arms is Azure a Ploughshare Argent between two Mullets of Five of the same in Chief and Coupeaux Vert.

== Demographics ==
Zetzwil has a population (as of December 2020) of 1,363 As of June 2009, 8.3% of the population are foreign nationals. Over the last 10 years (1997–2007) the population has changed at a rate of 2.6%. Most of the population (as of 2000) speaks German (95.8%), with Serbo-Croatian being second most common ( 1.0%) and Italian being third ( 0.9%).

The age distribution, as of 2008, in Zetzwil is; 107 children or 8.5% of the population are between 0 and 9 years old and 160 teenagers or 12.7% are between 10 and 19. Of the adult population, 168 people or 13.4% of the population are between 20 and 29 years old. 166 people or 13.2% are between 30 and 39, 209 people or 16.6% are between 40 and 49, and 182 people or 14.5% are between 50 and 59. The senior population distribution is 130 people or 10.3% of the population are between 60 and 69 years old, 92 people or 7.3% are between 70 and 79, there are 39 people or 3.1% who are between 80 and 89, and there are 5 people or 0.4% who are 90 and older.

As of 2000, there were 32 homes with 1 or 2 persons in the household, 206 homes with 3 or 4 persons in the household, and 234 homes with 5 or more persons in the household. The average number of people per household was 2.46 individuals. As of 2000, there were 479 private households (homes and apartments) in the municipality, and an average of 2.5 persons per household. In 2008 there were 260 single family homes (or 47.8% of the total) out of a total of 544 homes and apartments. There were a total of 11 empty apartments for a 2.0% vacancy rate. As of 2007, the construction rate of new housing units was 2.4 new units per 1000 residents.

In the 2007 federal election the most popular party was the SVP which received 47.9% of the vote. The next three most popular parties were the SP (11.8%), the FDP (11.5%) and the CSP (7.9%).

In Zetzwil about 69.7% of the population (between age 25–64) have completed either non-mandatory upper secondary education or additional higher education (either university or a Fachhochschule). Of the school age population (in the 2008/2009 school year), there are 92 students attending primary school in the municipality.

The historical population is given in the following table:

Historical population
Year	Pop.	±%
1975	918	—
1980	961	+4.7%
1990	1,185	+23.3%
2000	1,208	+1.9%

== Economy ==
As of 2007, Zetzwil had an unemployment rate of 1.2%. As of 2005, there were 48 people employed in the primary economic sector and about 18 businesses involved in this sector. 118 people are employed in the secondary sector and there are 22 businesses in this sector. 338 people are employed in the tertiary sector, with 34 businesses in this sector.

In 2000 there were 660 workers who lived in the municipality. Of these, 494 or about 74.8% of the residents worked outside Zetzwil while 308 people commuted into the municipality for work. There were a total of 474 jobs (of at least 6 hours per week) in the municipality. Of the working population, 9.4% used public transportation to get to work, and 57.6% used a private car.

== Religion ==
From the 2000 census, 198 or 15.9% were Roman Catholic, while 875 or 70.3% belonged to the Swiss Reformed Church.
