= Reinach, Aargau =

Reinach
- Municipality
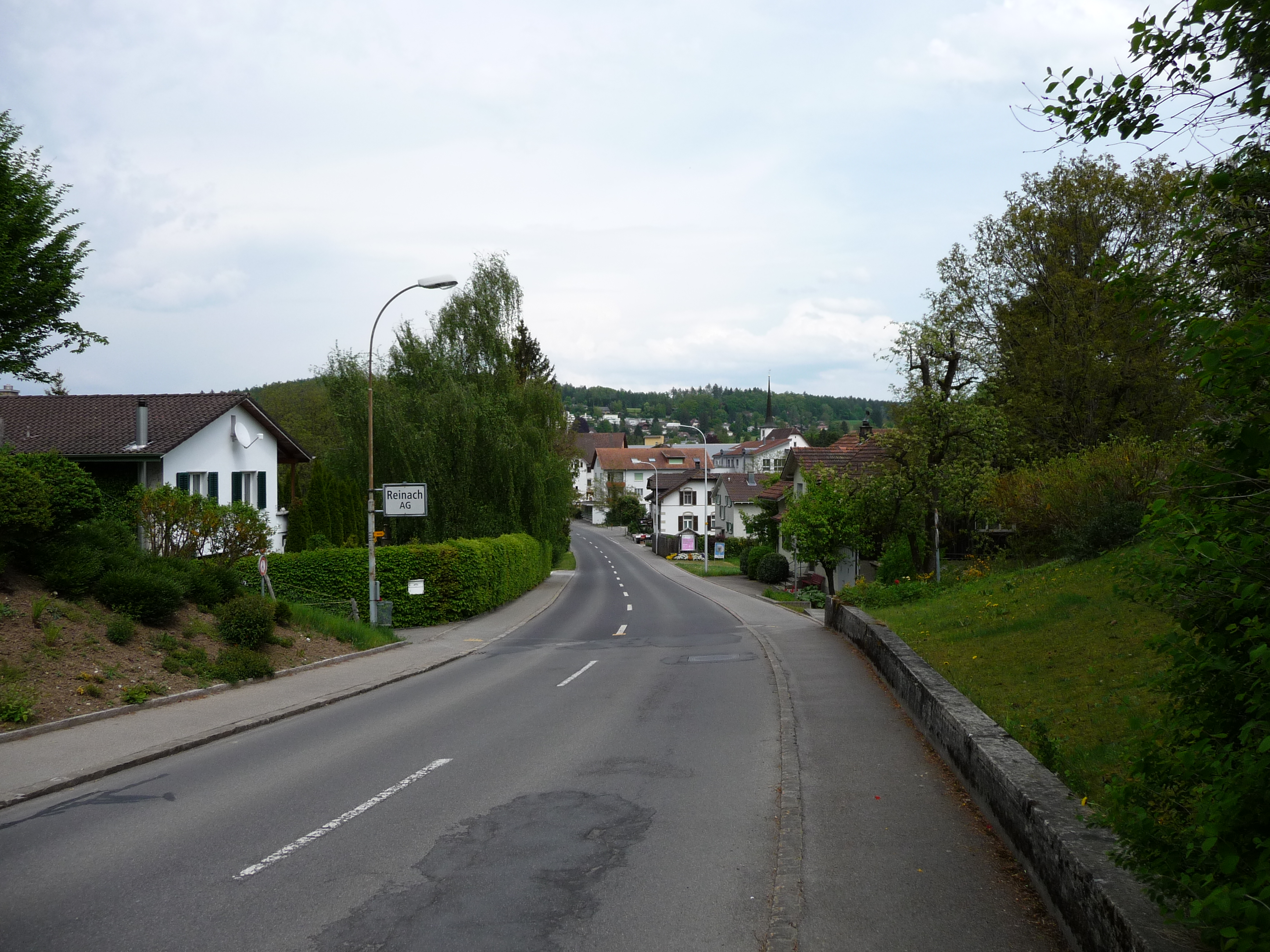

- Flag Coat of arms
- Location of Reinach
- Location within Switzerland Location within Canton of Aargau
- Coordinates: 47°15′N 8°11′E
- Country: Switzerland
- Canton: Aargau
- District: Kulm

Area
  - Total: 9.47 km^{2} (3.66 sq mi)
- Elevation: 528 m (1,732 ft)

Population (December 2006)
  - Total: 7,703
  - Density: 813/km^{2} (2,110/sq mi)
- Time zone: UTC+01:00 (CET)
  - Summer (DST): UTC+02:00 (CEST)
- Postal code: 5734
- SFOS number: 4141
- ISO 3166 code: CH-AG
- Surrounded by: Beinwil am See, Birrwil, Gontenschwil, Leimbach, Menziken, Pfeffikon (LU), Rickenbach (LU), Zetzwil
- Website: reinach.ch

Reinach (Swiss Standard German pronunciation: [ˈraɪnax]) is a municipality in the district of Kulm in the canton of Aargau in Switzerland.

== History ==
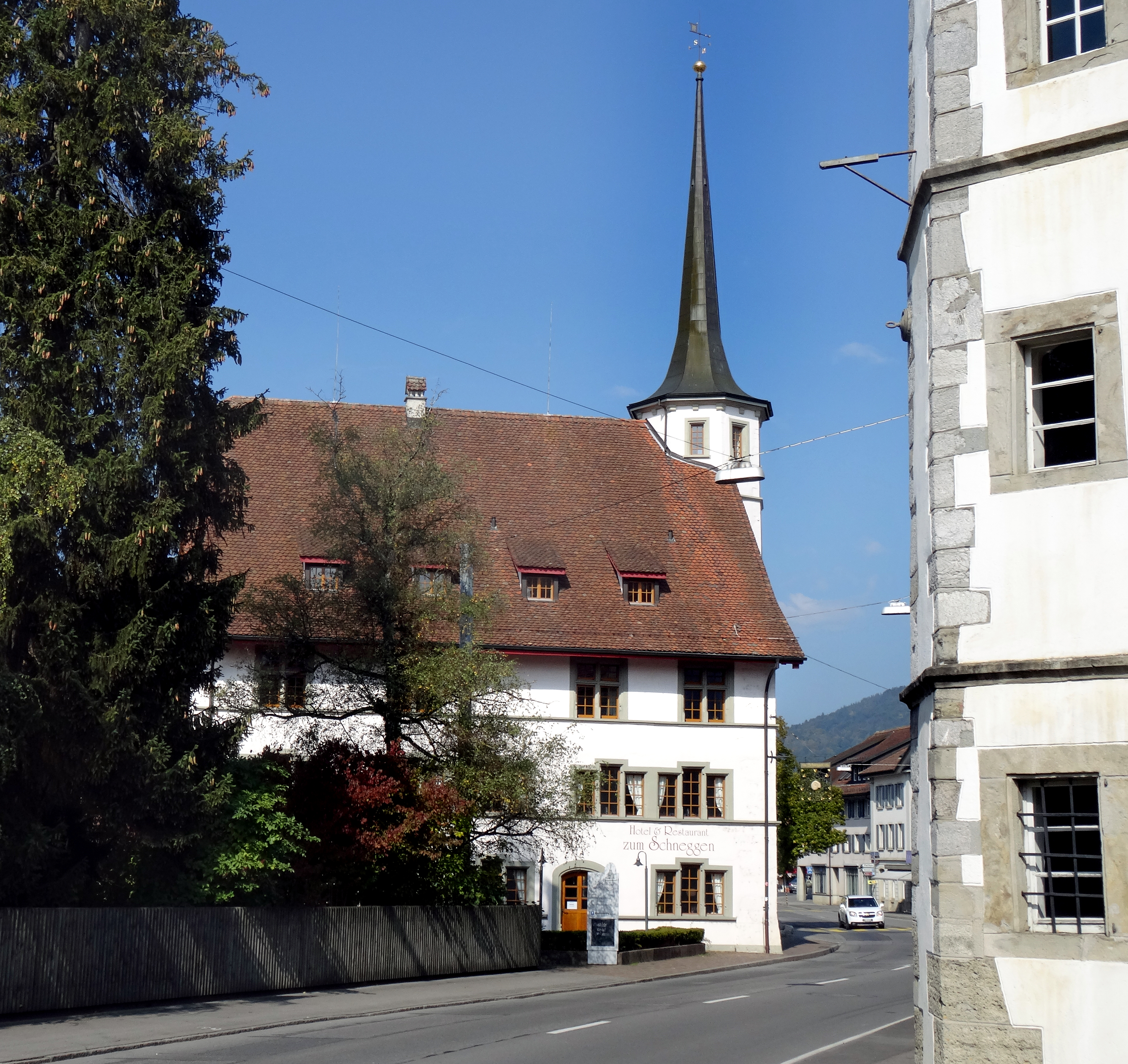
House "zum Schneggen", former site of the Deputy Vogt of Reinach

Aerial view (1964)

Scattered neolithic items indicated that the area around Reinach has been occupied since at least that time. Several Hallstatt era tumuli (at Sonnenberg), Roman era buildings (at Chilebreiti) and Alamanni graves (at Herrenweg) confirm the early settlement of the region. Reinach is first mentioned in 1036 as Rinacha. At around the same time, the Lords of Reinach (named after their castle of Unter-Rinach, in a neighboring village), owned much of the property in the village. Reinach, together with Menziken, Burg and Wilhof, formed the lands of the Lords of Reinach. The sovereign rights of the Lords of Reinach fell in 1402 or 1404 to the Ribi family, the schultheiss of Lenzburg, and the Alsatian noble family of Mörsberg. In 1572 Reinach separated from Menziken to each become independent municipalities. After the conquest of Aargau by Bern in 1415, Reinach remained the center of the court of Reinach within the bailiwick of Lenzburg.

Ecclesiastically, before the Protestant Reformation in 1528, Reinach belonged to the parish of Pfeffikon. After it converted to the new denomination, a new parish was formed with Menziken, Beinwil am See, Burg and Leimbach. The parish church was built in 1528–29. Menziken and Burg separated from the parish in 1890 and Beinwil left in 1933.

From the 14th century, two mills and a tavern are mentioned in Reinach. In 1588 the town was granted market rights and a marketplace was built. In the 16th and 17th centuries, the canvas weaving industry spread to the village. From about 1850 to 1970 Reinach was a center of the tobacco and cigar industry. The Wynental- und Suhrentalbahn connected the municipality in 1904 to Aarau as part of the Reinach-Menziken line. In the 20th century several companies in the metals industry settled in Reinach. Merger negotiations with neighboring communities in the upper Wynental were suspended because of little financial participation by the canton. Regional cooperation may improve as part of a regional development concept.

== Geography ==
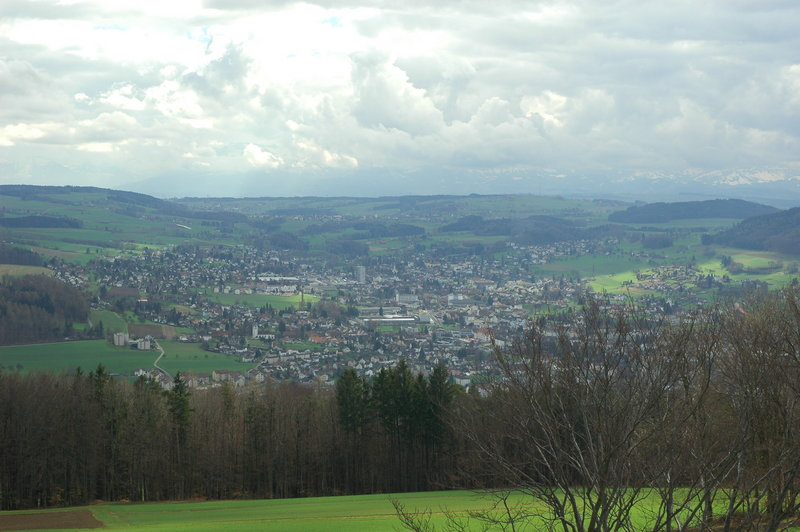
Reinach, seen from the Homberg (28 March 2005)

Reinach has an area, as of 2009, of 9.47 square kilometers (3.66 sq mi). Of this area, 4.24 square kilometers (1.64 sq mi) or 44.8% is used for agricultural purposes, while 2.57 square kilometers (0.99 sq mi) or 27.1% is forested. Of the rest of the land, 2.69 square kilometers (1.04 sq mi) or 28.4% is settled (buildings or roads), 0.02 km^{2} (4.9 acres) or 0.2% is either rivers or lakes and 0.01 km^{2} (2.5 acres) or 0.1% is unproductive land.

Of the built up area, industrial buildings made up 3.6% of the total area while housing and buildings made up 16.8% and transportation infrastructure made up 5.7%. Power and water infrastructure as well as other special developed areas made up 1.1% of the area while parks, green belts and sports fields made up 1.3%. 26.2% of the total land area is heavily forested. Of the agricultural land, 26.5% is used for growing crops and 15.0% is pastures, while 3.3% is used for orchards or vine crops. All the water in the municipality is in rivers and streams.

The municipality is located in the Kulm district, in the upper Wynental (Wyna river valley).

== Coat of arms ==
The blazon of the municipal coat of arms is Or a Lion rampant Gules with head and tongue Azure.

== Demographics ==
Reinach has a population (as of December 2020) of 8,874 As of June 2009, 35.9% of the population are foreign nationals. Over the last 10 years (1997–2007) the population has changed at a rate of 5.2%. Most of the population (as of 2000) speaks German (82.6%), with Albanian being second most common ( 4.5%) and Italian being third ( 4.0%).

The age distribution, as of 2008, in Reinach is; 783 children or 9.9% of the population are between 0 and 9 years old and 1,002 teenagers or 12.7% are between 10 and 19. Of the adult population, 1,058 people or 13.4% of the population are between 20 and 29 years old. 957 people or 12.2% are between 30 and 39, 1,309 people or 16.6% are between 40 and 49, and 1,057 people or 13.4% are between 50 and 59. The senior population distribution is 795 people or 10.1% of the population are between 60 and 69 years old, 547 people or 6.9% are between 70 and 79, there are 317 people or 4.0% who are between 80 and 89, and there are 50 people or 0.6% who are 90 and older.

As of 2000, there were 313 homes with 1 or 2 persons in the household, 1,649 homes with 3 or 4 persons in the household, and 939 homes with 5 or more persons in the household. The average number of people per household was 2.39 individuals. As of 2000, there were 2,964 private households (homes and apartments) in the municipality, and an average of 2.4 persons per household. In 2008 there were 1,085 single family homes (or 29.9% of the total) out of a total of 3,623 homes and apartments. There were a total of 89 empty apartments for a 2.5% vacancy rate. As of 2007, the construction rate of new housing units was 8.5 new units per 1000 residents.

In the 2007 federal election the most popular party was the SVP which received 44.7% of the vote. The next three most popular parties were the FDP (15%), the SP (14.9999%) and the CSP (6%).

In Reinach about 59.9% of the population (between age 25–64) have completed either non-mandatory upper secondary education or additional higher education (either university or a Fachhochschule). Of the school age population (in the 2008/2009 school year), there are 536 students attending primary school, there are 249 students attending secondary school, there are 241 students attending tertiary or university level schooling in the municipality.

The historical population is given in the following table:

Historical population
Year	Pop.	±%
1764	1,261	—
1803	1,672	+32.6%
1850	2,846	+70.2%
1900	3,668	+28.9%
1950	4,891	+33.3%
2000	7,258	+48.4%
2010	7,979	+9.9%

== Economy ==
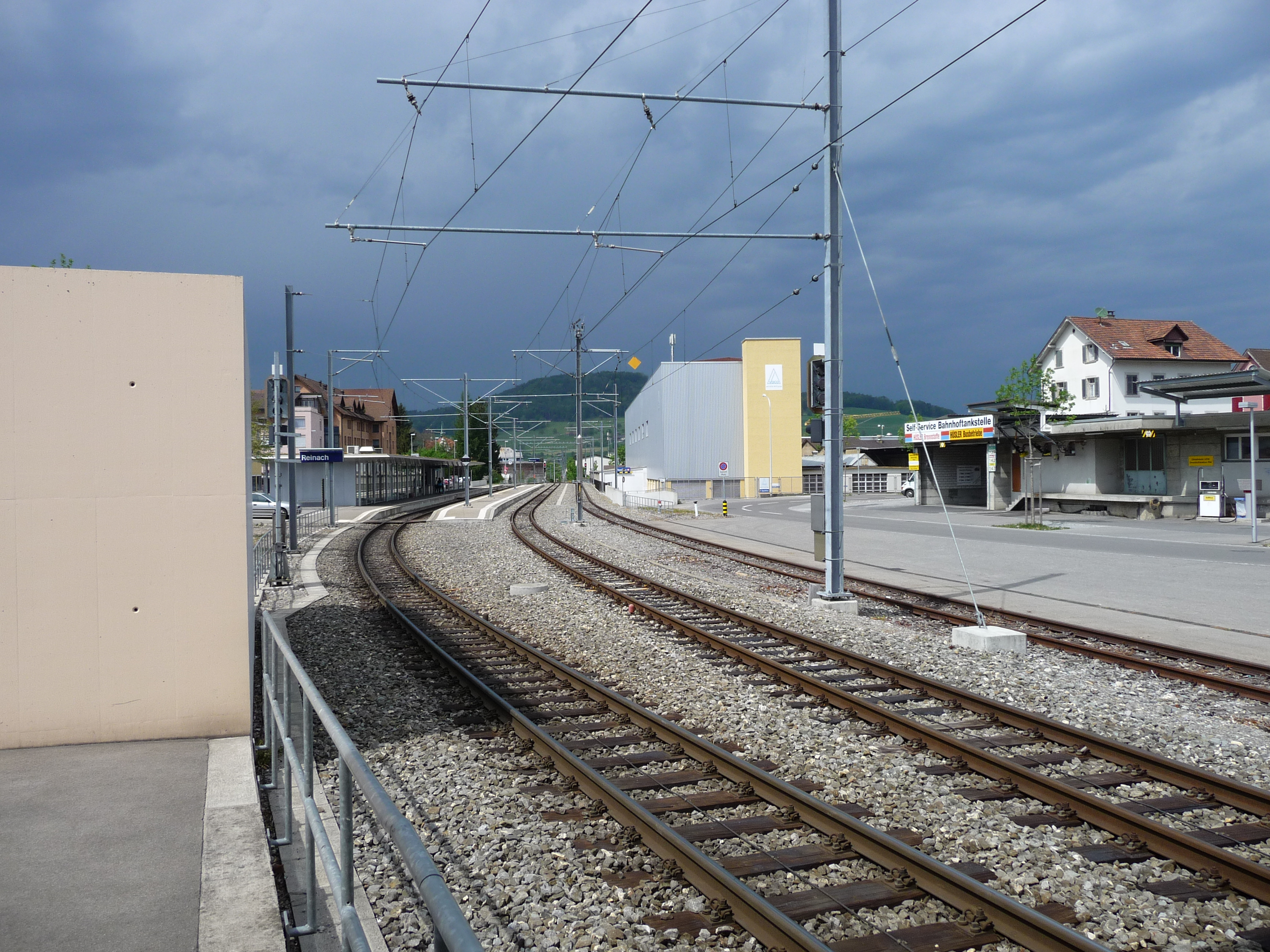
Reinach AG railway station

As of 2007, Reinach had an unemployment rate of 2.85%. As of 2005, there were 82 people employed in the primary economic sector and about 23 businesses involved in this sector. 1,237 people are employed in the secondary sector and there are 98 businesses in this sector. 1,803 people are employed in the tertiary sector, with 321 businesses in this sector.

In 2000 there were 3,646 workers who lived in the municipality. Of these, 2,333 or about 64.0% of the residents worked outside Reinach while 1,638 people commuted into the municipality for work. There were a total of 2,951 jobs (of at least 6 hours per week) in the municipality. Of the working population, 8.4% used public transportation to get to work, and 53.7% used a private car.

== Religion ==
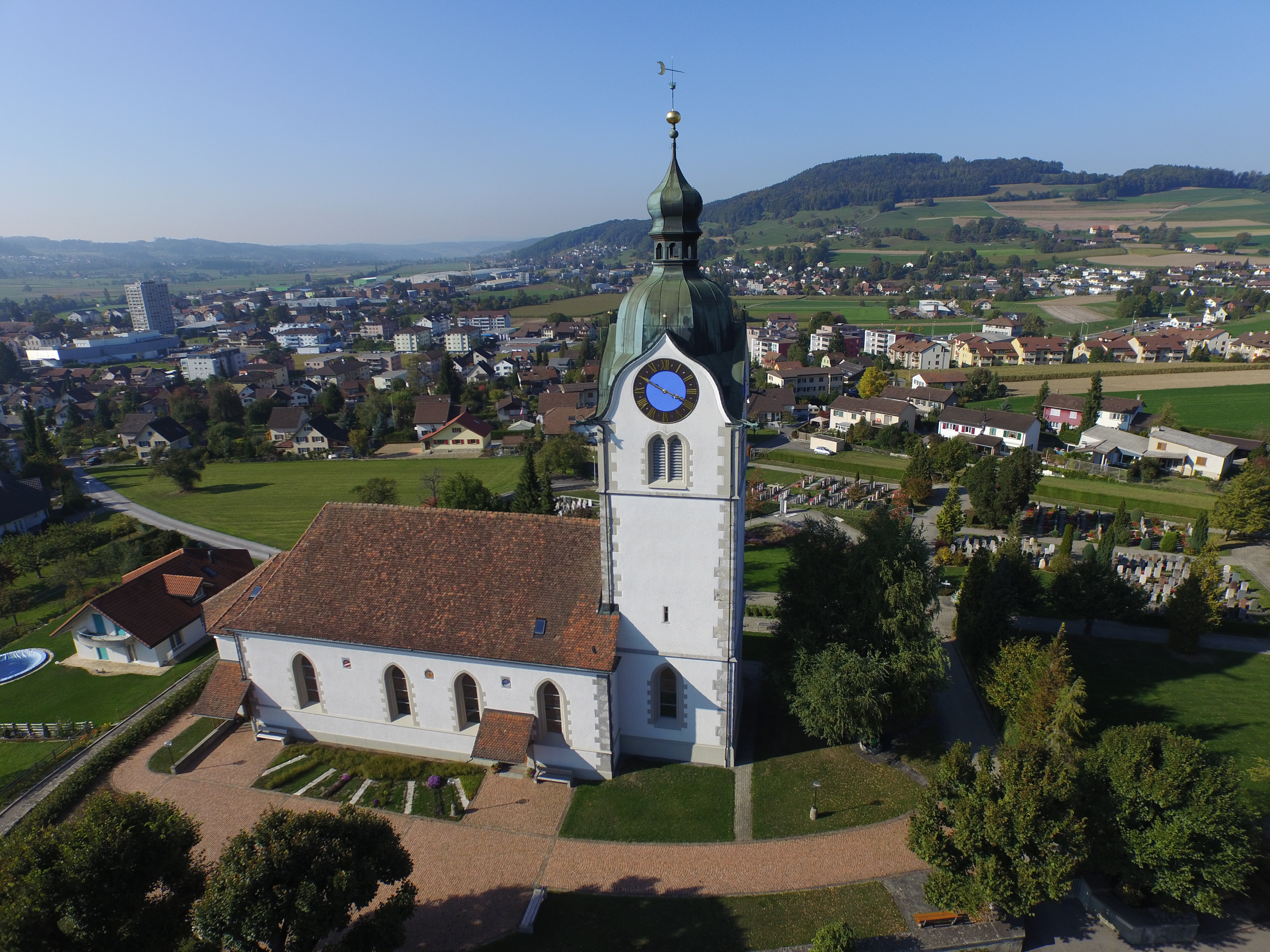
Church in Reinach

From the 2000 census, 2,070 or 28.5% were Roman Catholic, while 3,283 or 45.2% belonged to the Swiss Reformed Church. Of the rest of the population, there were 6 individuals (or about 0.08% of the population) who belonged to the Christian Catholic faith.

== Notable residents ==
- Adolf Fischer (1807–1893), politician
- Willi Gautschi (1920–2004), historian
- Kurt Hediger (born 1932), painter
- Markus Hediger (born 1959), writer and translator
- Regula Hitz (born 1986), snooker player
- Hans Hunziker (1874–1942), entrepreneur
- Edgar Lüscher (1925–1990), experimental physcisit
- Herbert Müller (1940–1981), racing driver
- Philipp Müller (born 1952), politician and since 2012 president of the FDP Switzerland
- Bertrand Vogt (1857-1936), industrialist and politician
