= Wyna (river) =

River in Switzerland

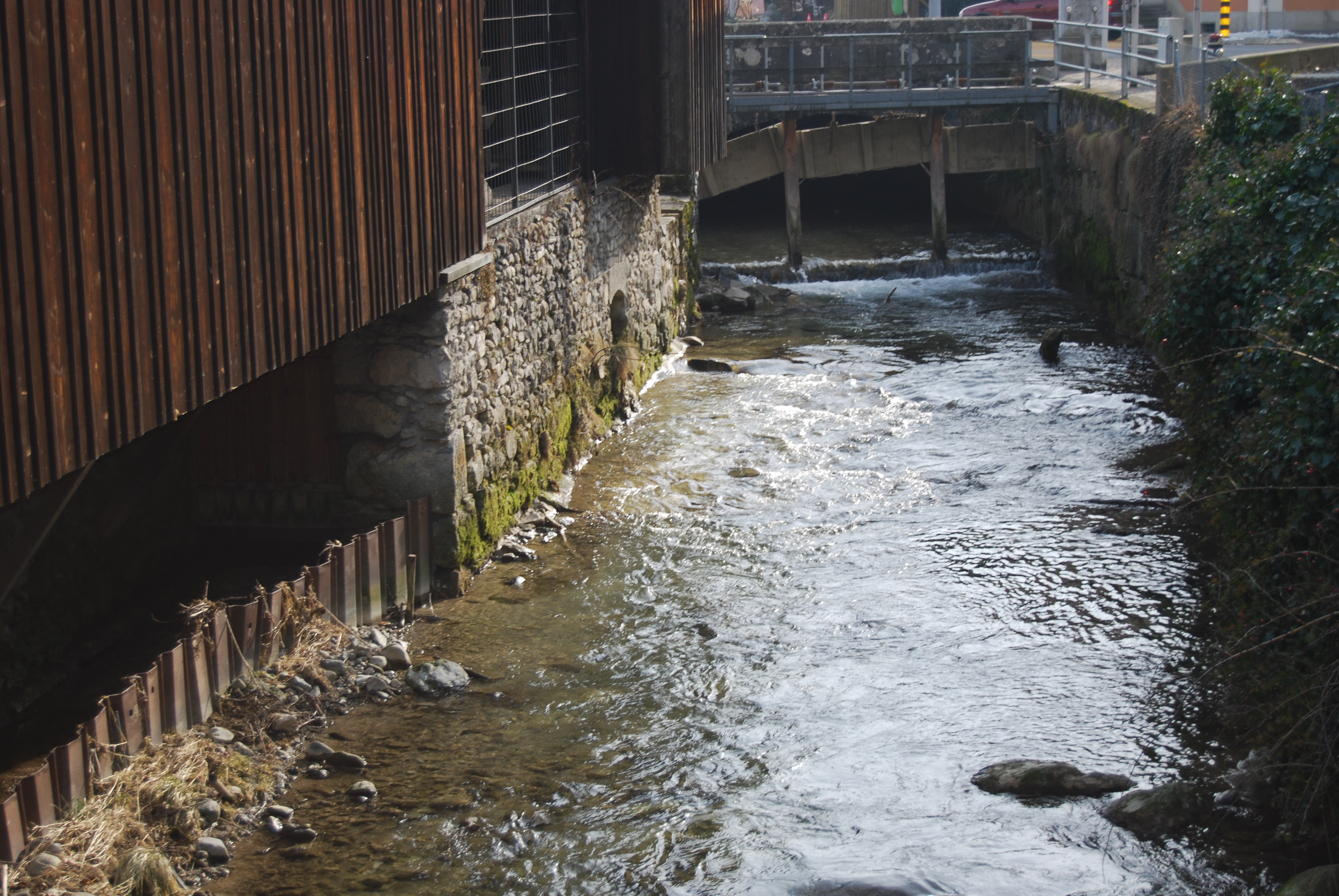
- The Wyna in Menziken

- Location of the mouth in Switzerland

Location
- Country: Switzerland
- Canton: Lucerne, Aargau
- Region: Wynetal

Physical characteristics
- Source confluence: Lochbach Neudorf
  - location: Lindwald, Neudorf, Lucerne, Switzerland
  - coordinates: 47.17383°N 8.22795°E
  - elevation: 782 m (2,566 ft)
- Mouth: Suhre
  - location: Suhr, Aargau, Switzerland
  - coordinates: 47.38075°N 8.22801°E
  - elevation: 385 m (1,263 ft)
- Length: 32 km (20 mi)
- Discharge
  - average: 0.9 m^{3}/s (32 cu ft/s)

Basin features
- Progression: Suhre→ Aare→ Rhine→ North Sea
- Tributaries
  - left: Lochbach, Moosbach, Rickenbach, Dorfbach
  - right: Schwarzenbach

The Wyna (or Wyne) is a river located mostly in canton of Aargau, but also in canton of Lucerne, Switzerland and runs through the Wynetal (the Wyne Valley). It is a tributary of the Suhre. The Wyna is 32 km long (main outflow in Reinach (AG): 0.9 m^{3}/s). Larger towns in Wynetal are Beromünster, Menziken, Reinach (AG) and Gränichen.

== River ==
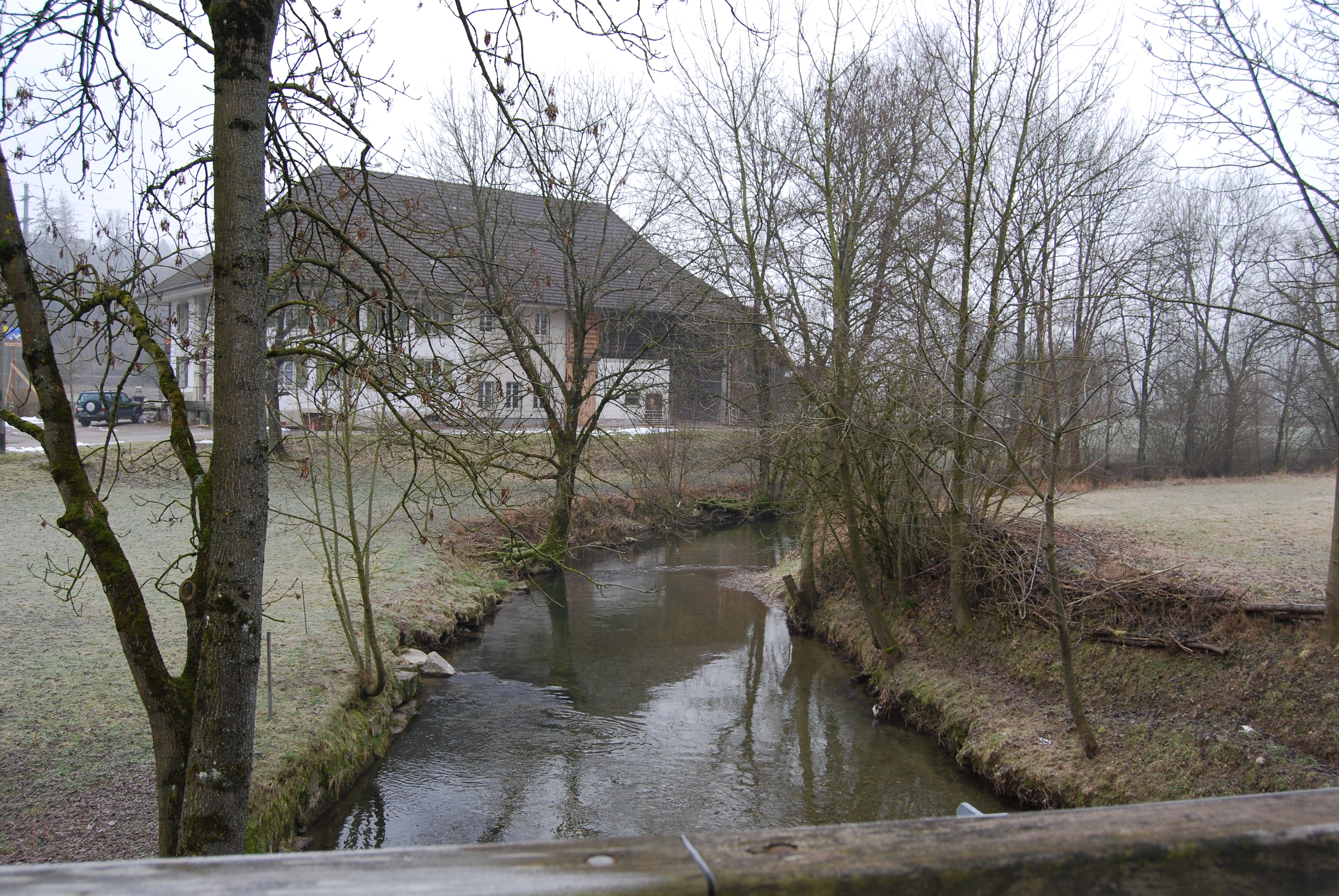
The Wyna in Suhr

The Wyna is started by several headwaters south-west of Neudorf (LU) in the Lindewald (forest), 17 km north-east from Lucerne. Near Underdorf, the Lochbach, or Hole Creek, which starts in the Chegelwald, west of Neudorf, joins the Wyna. Then, it runs north through Beromünster (still canton of Lucerne), through Menziken and Reinach (now in canton of Aargau), west of Zetzwil, through Oberkulm and Unterkulm, through Teufenthal (AG), and through Gränichen before joining the Suhre at 385m in Suhr, which joins the Aare further north, just three kilometres later.

Tributaries that feed the Wyna include the Lochbach (left, in Underdorf), Moosbach (left, north of Beromünster), Schwarzenbach (right, south of Menziken), Rickenbach (left, south of Menziken), Vorderdorfbach Zetzwil/Totenbächli (right, in Zetzwil), and Dorfbach Gontenschwil/Sagenbach (left, after Zetzwil]), Dorfbach Teufenthal (right, in Teufenthal (AG)), Pfendelbach (left, west of the hamlet Bleien), Refentalbach (right, just after Bleien), Lochbach (left, in Gränichen).

== Valley ==
The valley, the Wynetal (or Germanized also known as Wynental), is fairly narrow, with an average width of about 500 meters, and drops very smoothly from 670m a.s.l. in Neudorf to 406m a.s.l. in Gränichen. Quite steep hills rise on both sides, carved by tributary valleys. In the east, a mountain range (about 810m to 600m a.s.l.) separate the Wynetal from the Seetal with the Hallwilersee and the Baldeggersee. The mountain range in the west (about 870m to 570m a.s.l.) separate the Wyne Valley from the Suhretal with the Sempachersee, from which the Suhre rises.

Municipalities found in the Wynental from beginning to end of the Wyna are: Neudorf, Beromünster, Burg (AG) and Menziken, Pfeffikon and Reinach (AG), Leimbach (AG), Gontenschwil, Zetzwil, Oberkulm and then Unterkulm, Teufenthal (AG), Gränichen, and finally Suhr. The general region is also known as the Stumpenland due to the cigar industry that once centered in Menziken.

== Glacial genesis ==
The upper portions of the valley was carved by the Reuss Glacier. Large moraine deposits remain at Zetzwil and Gontenschwil. The surrounding hills are largely molasse.

== Transportation ==
Connecting road 23 runs along the Wyna for the majority of the valley's length from Beromünster to Suhr. This road is referred to variously as Aargauerstrasse, Hauptstrasse, Aarauerstrasse, Wynentalstrasse, and numerous names north of Teufenthal and is a popular cycling route. The Wynental branch of the narrow-gauge Menziken–Aarau–Schöftland railway line serves the Wynental, running from Aarau to Menziken.

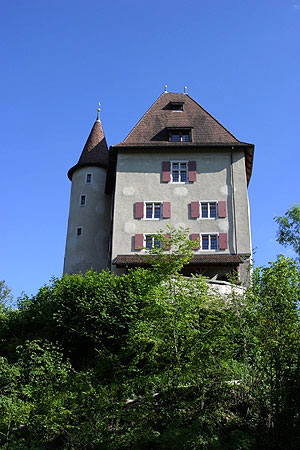
Castle Liebegg

== Points & Events of Interest ==
- Naturschutzgebiet Vogelmoos (Bird Moss Nature Preserve), one source of the Wyna
- Auffahrtsumritt in Beromünster (Ascension Day procession)
- Stiftskirche (collegiate church) St. Michael, Beromünster – dating to 1034
- Schloss Liebegg (castle), north of Teufenthal
- Schloss Trostburg (castle), east of Teufenthal (private estate)
- "Streckenplan Wyna-Trail" [Route map Wyna Trail] (PDF) (in German). Gemeinde Beromünster. Hiking trails along and near the Wyna, connecting Beromünster, Menziken, and Gunzwil.
