= Teufenthal =

- Municipality
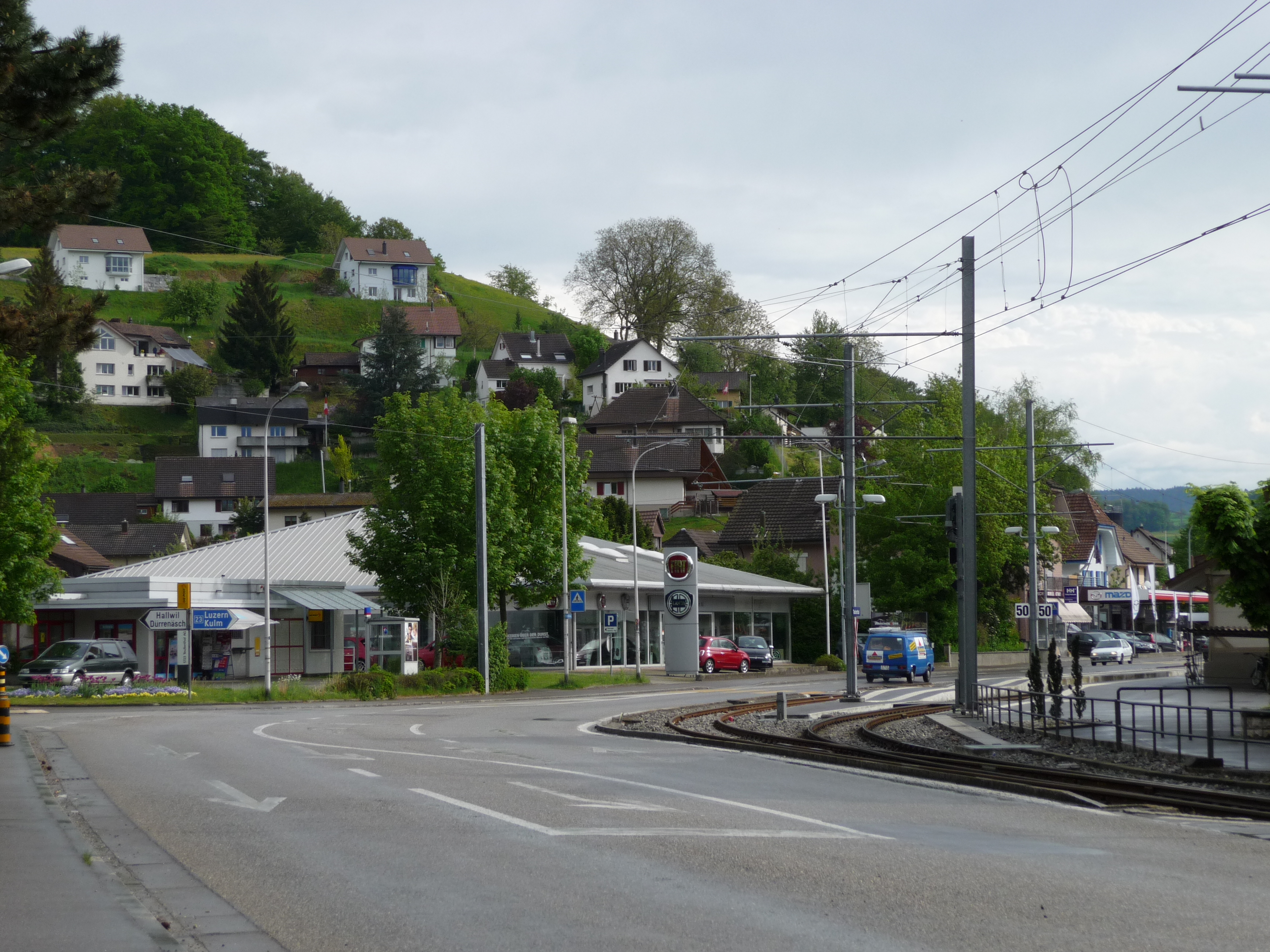

- Flag Coat of arms
- Location of Teufenthal
- Location within Switzerland Location within Canton of Aargau
- Coordinates: 47°20′N 8°7′E
- Country: Switzerland
- Canton: Aargau
- District: Kulm

Area
  - Total: 3.57 km^{2} (1.38 sq mi)
- Elevation: 453 m (1,486 ft)

Population (December 2014)
  - Total: 1,581
  - Density: 443/km^{2} (1,150/sq mi)
- Time zone: UTC+01:00 (CET)
  - Summer (DST): UTC+02:00 (CEST)
- Postal code: 5723
- SFOS number: 4145
- ISO 3166 code: CH-AG
- Surrounded by: Dürrenäsch, Gränichen, Seon, Unterkulm
- Website: www.teufenthal.ch

Teufenthal is a municipality in the district of Kulm in the canton of Aargau in Switzerland.

== Geography ==
Aerial view (1969)

The street lies in the lower part of a tight, three-kilometer long side of Wyna, in an easterly direction to the plateau of Dürrenäsch. It is bounded to the north by the foothills of the Surberg and to the south by the foothills of the High Rock. Only a small part of the village lies in the Wyna valley, the river forms the western border.

Teufenthal has an area, (as of the 2004/09 survey) of 3.57 km^{2} (1.38 sq mi). Of this area, about 39.4% is used for agricultural purposes, while 43.4% is forested and 17.2% is settled (buildings or roads). Over the past two decades (1979/85-2004/09) the amount of land that is settled has increased by 8 ha (20 acres) and the agricultural land has decreased by 3 ha (7.4 acres).

In 2009 a total of 0.61 square kilometers (0.24 sq mi) or 17.1% is settled and of the built up area, industrial buildings made up 1.4% of the total area while housing and buildings made up 10.9% and transportation infrastructure made up 3.1%. Parks, green belts and sports fields made up 1.4%. 42.0% of the total land area is heavily forested and 1.1% is covered with orchards or small clusters of trees. Of the agricultural land, 14.8% is used for growing crops and 22.7% is pastures, while 1.7% is used for orchards or vine crops.

The highest point is 630 meters (2,070 ft) on the Bampf (an offshoot of the Surberg), the lowest point is 438 meters (1,437 ft) at the Wyna.

Neighboring municipalities are Gränichen in the north, Seon in the northeast, Dürrenäsch Unterkulm in the east and south.

== Coat of arms ==
The blazon of the municipal coat of arms is Or on a Pile inverted issuant from chief Azure a Mullet of Five and Crescent of the first.

== Demographics ==
Teufenthal has a population (as of December 2020) of 1,682. As of 2013, 23.7% of the population are resident foreign nationals. Over the last 3 years (2010–2013) the population has changed at a rate of 0.63%. The birth rate in the municipality, in 2013, was 11.3 while the death rate was 8.8 per thousand residents.

Most of the population (as of 2000) speaks German (85.7%), with Serbo-Croatian being second most common (6.8%) and Italian being third (2.6%).

As of 2013, children and teenagers (0–19 years old) make up 20.6% of the population, while adults (20–64 years old) are 61.7% and seniors (over 64 years old) make up 17.8%. The age distribution, as of 2008, in Teufenthal is; 154 children or 9.4% of the population are between 0 and 9 years old and 213 teenagers or 13.0% are between 10 and 19. Of the adult population, 229 people or 13.9% of the population are between 20 and 29 years old. 192 people or 11.7% are between 30 and 39, 279 people or 17.0% are between 40 and 49, and 229 people or 13.9% are between 50 and 59. The senior population distribution is 158 people or 9.6% of the population are between 60 and 69 years old, 121 people or 7.4% are between 70 and 79, there are 61 people or 3.7% who are between 80 and 89, and there are 8 people or 0.5% who are 90 and older.

In 2013 there were 662 private households in Teufenthal. Of the 432 inhabited buildings in the municipality, in 2000, about 75.2% were single family homes and 10.2% were multiple family buildings. Additionally, about 12.0% of the buildings were built before 1919, while 9.7% were built between 1991 and 2000. In 2012 there were no new homes built, and the vacancy rate for the municipality, in 2014, was 0.54%.

As of 2000, there were 63 homes with 1 or 2 persons in the household, 313 homes with 3 or 4 persons in the household, and 264 homes with 5 or more persons in the household. The average number of people per household was 2.45 individuals. As of 2000, there were 647 private households (homes and apartments) in the municipality, and an average of 2.5 persons per household. In 2008 there were 337 single family homes (or 46.0% of the total) out of a total of 733 homes and apartments. There were a total of 4 empty apartments for a 0.5% vacancy rate. As of 2007, the construction rate of new housing units was 5.7 new units per 1000 residents.

The historical population is given in the following chart:

== Economy ==
As of 2012, there were a total of 289 people employed in the municipality. Of these, a total of 26 people worked in 11 businesses in the primary economic sector. The secondary sector employed 95 workers in 15 separate businesses. Finally, the tertiary sector provided 168 jobs in 59 businesses. In 2013 a total of 0.% of the population received social assistance.

In 2000 there were 845 workers who lived in the municipality. Of these, 623 or about 73.7% of the residents worked outside Teufenthal while 339 people commuted into the municipality for work. There were a total of 561 jobs (of at least 6 hours per week) in the municipality. Of the working population, 17.1% used public transportation to get to work, and 48.8% used a private car.

== Politics ==
In the 2015 federal election the most popular party was the SVP with 45.7% of the vote. The next three most popular parties were the FDP (15.5%), the SP (14.7%) and the BDP (4.9%). In the federal election, a total of 436 votes were cast, and the voter turnout was 43.0%.

In the 2007 federal election the most popular party was the SVP which received 45.4% of the vote. The next three most popular parties were the SP (18.6%), the FDP (12.7%) and the Green Party (6.6%).

== Education ==
In Teufenthal about 67.1% of the population (between age 25–64) have completed either non-mandatory upper secondary education or additional higher education (either university or a Fachhochschule). Of the school age population (in the 2008/2009 school year), there are 112 students attending primary school, there are 54 students attending secondary school in the municipality.

== Religion ==
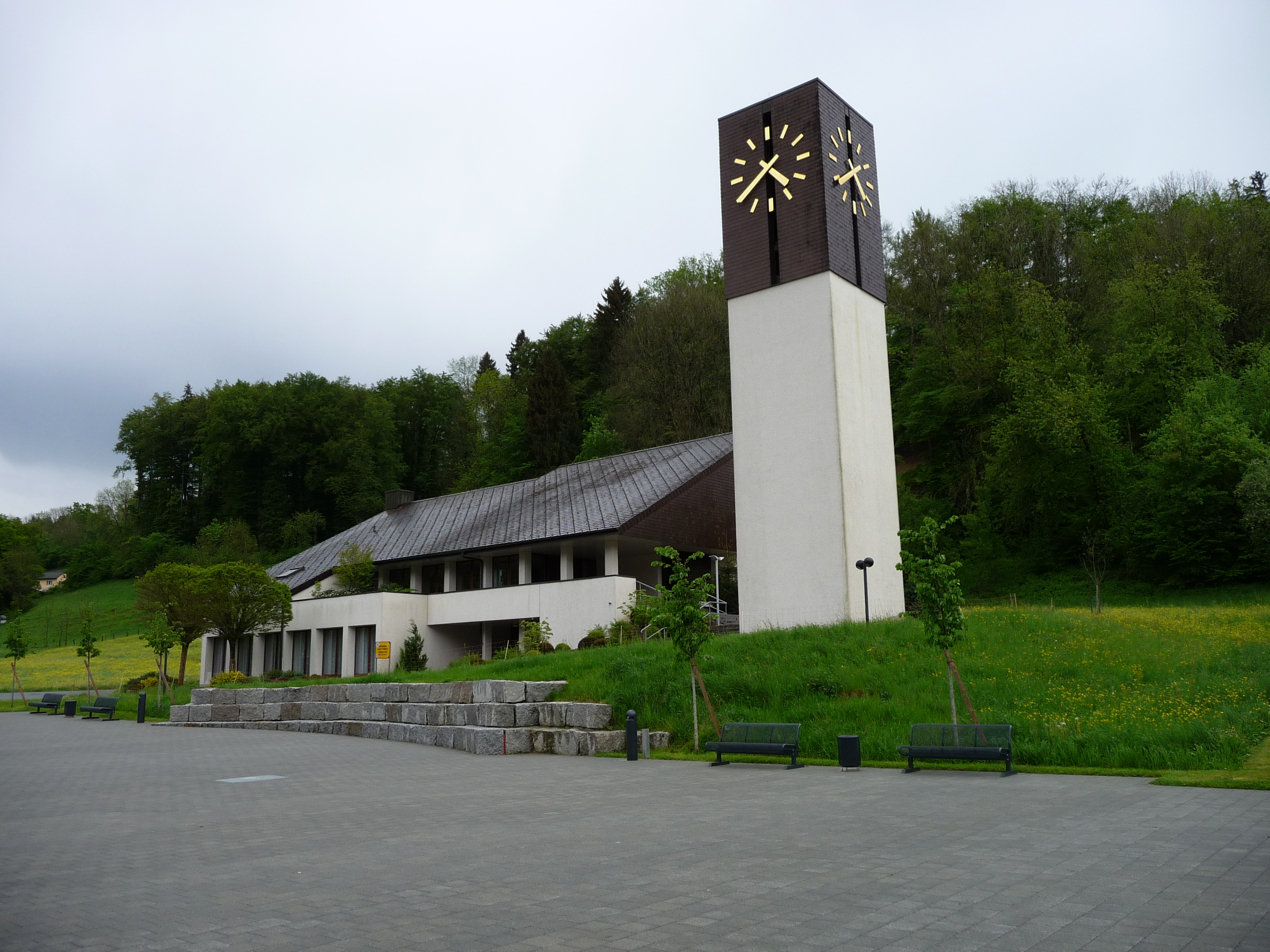
Church in Teufenthal

From the 2000 census, 377 or 23.6% were Roman Catholic, while 875 or 54.8% belonged to the Swiss Reformed Church.
