= Hunzenschwil =

- Municipality
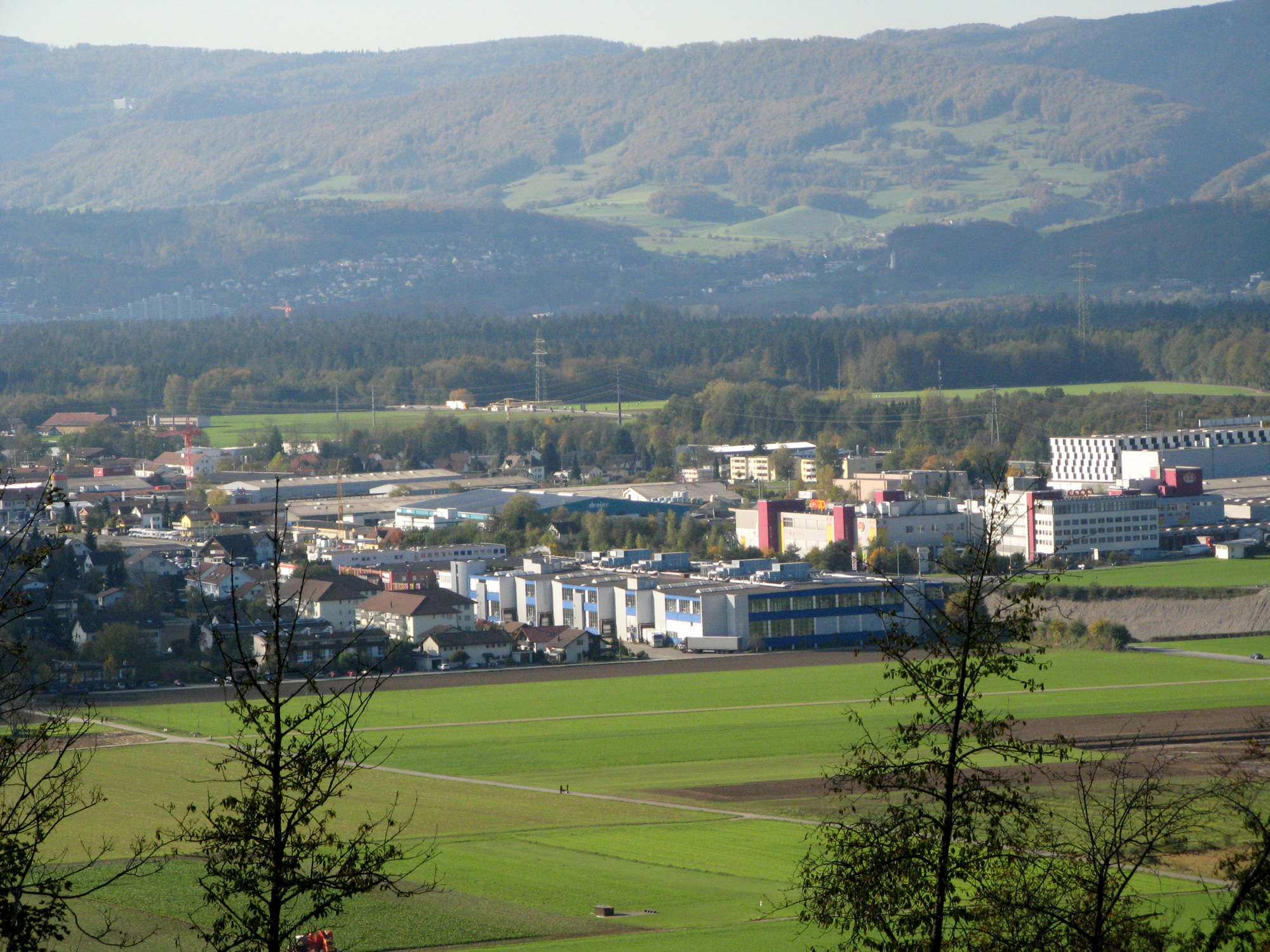

- Flag Coat of arms
- Location of Hunzenschwil
- Location within Switzerland Location within Canton of Aargau
- Coordinates: 47°23′N 8°8′E
- Country: Switzerland
- Canton: Aargau
- District: Lenzburg

Area
  - Total: 3.26 km^{2} (1.26 sq mi)
- Elevation: 402 m (1,319 ft)

Population (December 2006)
  - Total: 2,798
  - Density: 858/km^{2} (2,220/sq mi)
- Time zone: UTC+01:00 (CET)
  - Summer (DST): UTC+02:00 (CEST)
- Postal code: 5502
- SFOS number: 4200
- ISO 3166 code: CH-AG
- Surrounded by: Gränichen, Rupperswil, Schafisheim, Suhr
- Website: www.hunzenschwil.ch

Hunzenschwil is a municipality in the district of Lenzburg in the canton of Aargau in Switzerland.

== History ==
Under the Romans, the area that would become Hunzenschwil was an extensive brickyard. The modern village of Hunzenschwil was first mentioned in 1101 as Hintziswil. In 1201, it was mentioned as Hunzeliswilre. In the 14th century, the Habsburgs had the high court rights over the village, and in 1415 these rights went to Bern. The low court right was held by various owners before 1412 when it went to the Habsburg appointed Vogt at Lenzburg. In 1433, the low court rights went to Bern, and then in 1550 Hunzenschwil joined with Niederlenz, Rupperswil and Staufen to form an independent lower court.

Religiously, this area belongs to the parish of Suhr, but it has had its own church since 1960.

Although the municipality is on the road between Bern and Zurich and at the junction that goes toward Zurzach, in the past it was dominated by agriculture. In the 18th and 19th centuries some textile processing (linen, cotton, silk ribbons) businesses entered the village. In 1877 a station of the Federal Railway was built. Until about 1940, there were a number of small businesses (including a wheelwright). Since then most of the jobs have been in the automotive and furniture industries or in storage and shipping. In 1950 the village began to expand rapidly. In 1965 an access road to the highway opened.

== Geography ==
Aerial view (1962)

Hunzenschwil has an area, as of 2009, of 3.26 square kilometers (1.26 sq mi). Of this area, 1.11 km^{2} (0.43 sq mi) or 34.0% is used for agricultural purposes, while 0.8 km^{2} (0.31 sq mi) or 24.5% is forested. Of the rest of the land, 1.34 km^{2} (0.52 sq mi) or 41.1% is settled (buildings or roads), 0.01 km^{2} (2.5 acres) or 0.3% is either rivers or lakes.

Of the built up area, industrial buildings made up 10.1% of the total area while housing and buildings made up 15.6% and transportation infrastructure made up 12.3%. Power and water infrastructure as well as other special developed areas made up 2.5% of the area Out of the forested land, all of the forested land area is covered with heavy forests. Of the agricultural land, 22.7% is used for growing crops and 9.8% is pastures, while 1.5% is used for orchards or vine crops. All the water in the municipality is in rivers and streams.

The municipality is located in the Lenzburg district. Until the 1940s Hunzenschwil was a linear village, though it has expanded along other roads since then.

== Coat of arms ==
The blazon of the municipal coat of arms is Azure a Greyhound salient Or.

== Demographics ==
Hunzenschwil has a population (as of December 2020) of 4,209 As of June 2009, 23.0% of the population are foreign nationals. Over the last 10 years (1997–2007) the population has changed at a rate of 14.8%. Most of the population (as of 2000) speaks German (86.3%), with Italian being second most common ( 5.6%) and Albanian being third ( 2.6%).

The age distribution, as of 2008, in Hunzenschwil is; 282 children or 9.4% of the population are between 0 and 9 years old and 329 teenagers or 10.9% are between 10 and 19. Of the adult population, 456 people or 15.2% of the population are between 20 and 29 years old. 456 people or 15.2% are between 30 and 39, 499 people or 16.6% are between 40 and 49, and 416 people or 13.8% are between 50 and 59. The senior population distribution is 309 people or 10.3% of the population are between 60 and 69 years old, 156 people or 5.2% are between 70 and 79, there are 90 people or 3.0% who are between 80 and 89, and there are 15 people or 0.5% who are 90 and older.

As of 2000 the average number of residents per living room was 0.56 which is about equal to the cantonal average of 0.57 per room. In this case, a room is defined as space of a housing unit of at least 4 m^{2} (43 sq ft) as normal bedrooms, dining rooms, living rooms, kitchens and habitable cellars and attics. About 55.6% of the total households were owner occupied, or in other words did not pay rent (though they may have a mortgage or a rent-to-own agreement).

As of 2000, there were 112 homes with 1 or 2 persons in the household, 616 homes with 3 or 4 persons in the household, and 349 homes with 5 or more persons in the household. As of 2000, there were 1,105 private households (homes and apartments) in the municipality, and an average of 2.3 persons per household. In 2008 there were 501 single family homes (or 36.2% of the total) out of a total of 1,384 homes and apartments. There were a total of 45 empty apartments for a 3.3% vacancy rate. As of 2007, the construction rate of new housing units was 19 new units per 1000 residents.

In the 2007 federal election the most popular party was the SVP which received 50.8% of the vote. The next three most popular parties were the SP (15.4%), the FDP (10.4%) and the CSP (5.9%).

The historical population is given in the following table:

Historical population
Year	Pop.	±%
1764	301	—
1798	570	+89.4%
1837	810	+42.1%
1850	747	−7.8%
1900	670	−10.3%
1950	925	+38.1%
1980	2,219	+139.9%
2000	2,575	+16.0%
2010	3,201	+24.3%
2020	4,207	+31.4%

== Heritage sites of national significance ==
The Ziegelmatte / Zotzelacker, a Roman era brickyard is listed as a Swiss heritage site of national significance.

== Economy ==
As of 2007, Hunzenschwil had an unemployment rate of 2.42%. As of 2005, there were 58 people employed in the primary economic sector and about 15 businesses involved in this sector. 482 people are employed in the secondary sector and there are 39 businesses in this sector. 777 people are employed in the tertiary sector, with 108 businesses in this sector.

In 2000 there were 1,455 workers who lived in the municipality. Of these, 1,125 or about 77.3% of the residents worked outside Hunzenschwil while 937 people commuted into the municipality for work. There were a total of 1,267 jobs (of at least 6 hours per week) in the municipality. Of the working population, 9.7% used public transportation to get to work, and 57.2% used a private car.

== Religion ==
From the 2000 census, 659 or 25.6% were Roman Catholic, while 1,306 or 50.7% belonged to the Swiss Reformed Church. Of the rest of the population, there were 2 individuals (or about 0.08% of the population) who belonged to the Christian Catholic faith.

== Education ==
The entire Swiss population is generally well educated. In Hunzenschwil about 68.9% of the population (between age 25 and 64) have completed either non-mandatory upper secondary education or additional higher education (either university or a Fachhochschule). Of the school age population (in the 2008/2009 school year), there are 186 students attending primary school, there are 101 students attending secondary school in the municipality. Hunzenschwil is home to the Gemeindebibliothek Hunzenschwil (municipal library of Hunzenschwil). The library has (as of 2008) 3,580 books or other media, and loaned out 4,156 items in the same year. The library was open a total of 76 days with average of 3 hours per week during that year.
