= Egliswil =

- Municipality
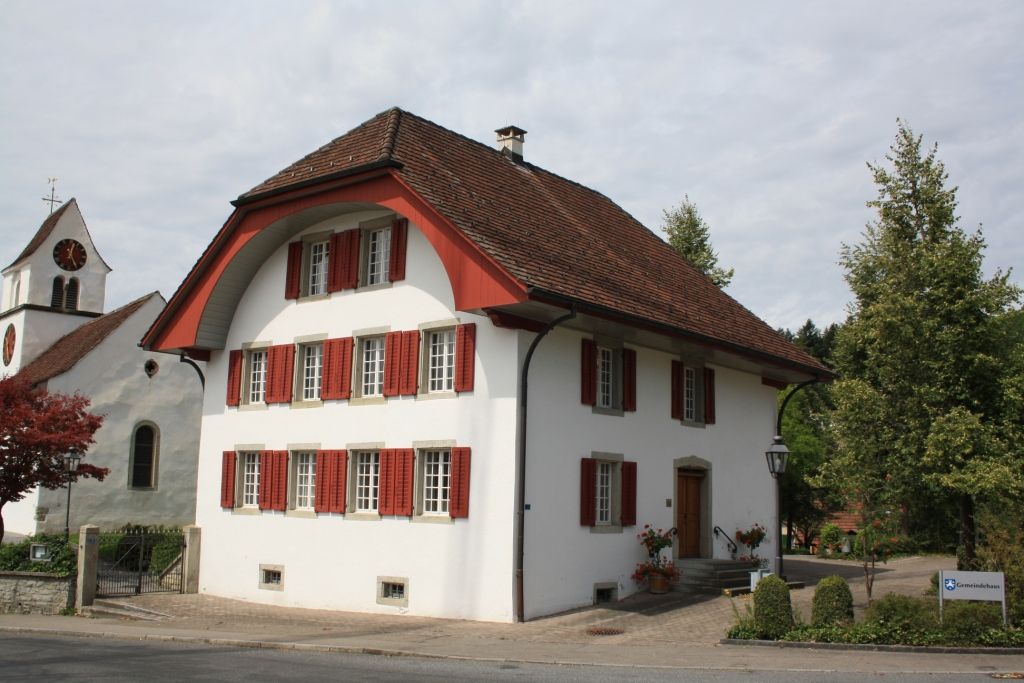
- Gemeindehaus (the community house)

- Flag Coat of arms
- Location of Egliswil
- Location within Switzerland Location within Canton of Aargau
- Coordinates: 47°21′N 8°11′E
- Country: Switzerland
- Canton: Aargau
- District: Lenzburg

Area
  - Total: 6.29 km^{2} (2.43 sq mi)
- Elevation: 470 m (1,540 ft)

Population (December 2006)
  - Total: 1,328
  - Density: 211/km^{2} (547/sq mi)
- Time zone: UTC+01:00 (CET)
  - Summer (DST): UTC+02:00 (CEST)
- Postal code: 5704
- SFOS number: 4195
- ISO 3166 code: CH-AG
- Surrounded by: Ammerswil, Dintikon, Lenzburg, Seengen, Seon, Villmergen
- Website: www.egliswil.ch

Egliswil is a municipality and village in the district of Lenzburg in the canton of Aargau in Switzerland.

Aerial view (1958)

== History ==
It appears that there was a Roman estate in Egliswil, though the only archeological evidence is a single Roman era grave. The modern village of Egliswil is first mentioned in 924 as Egirichiswilare. In 1331 the Habsburgs pledged the low justice rights to the Lords of Hallwyl. They merged Egliswil into the court of Hallwil. In 1677 they raised the, now much larger, village into its own independent court. The Untervogtei was placed in the Haus zum Sonnenberg a stone building from 1694.

The romanesque aisleless church, with a churchtower from the 16th century, was a branch of the church in Seengen.

In addition to grain, the main businesses of the village were vineyards (since the 17th century) and home working for the cotton industry (from 18th century). From the 1950s, small-scale industry moved into the edge of the village.

== Geography ==
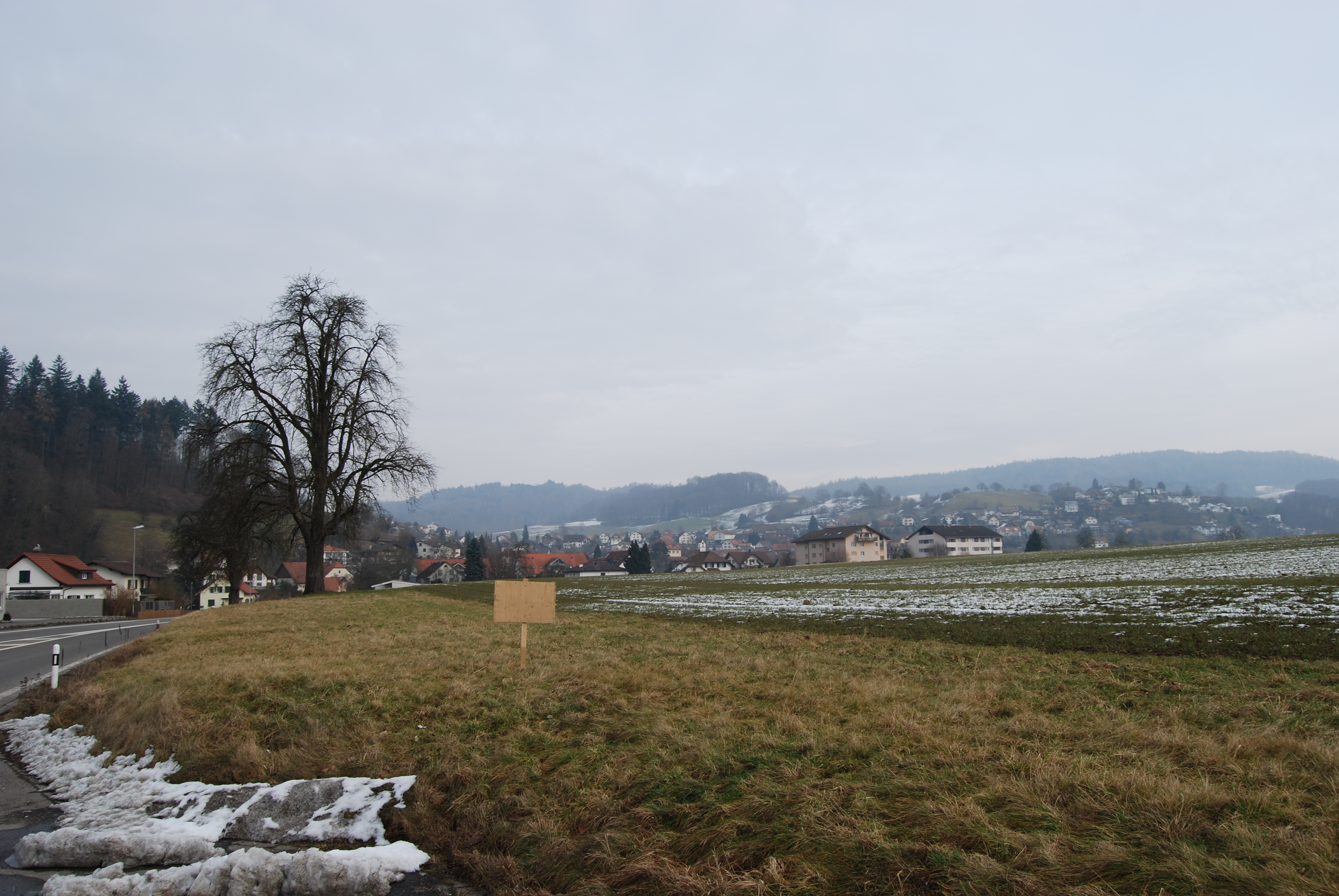
View of Egliswil

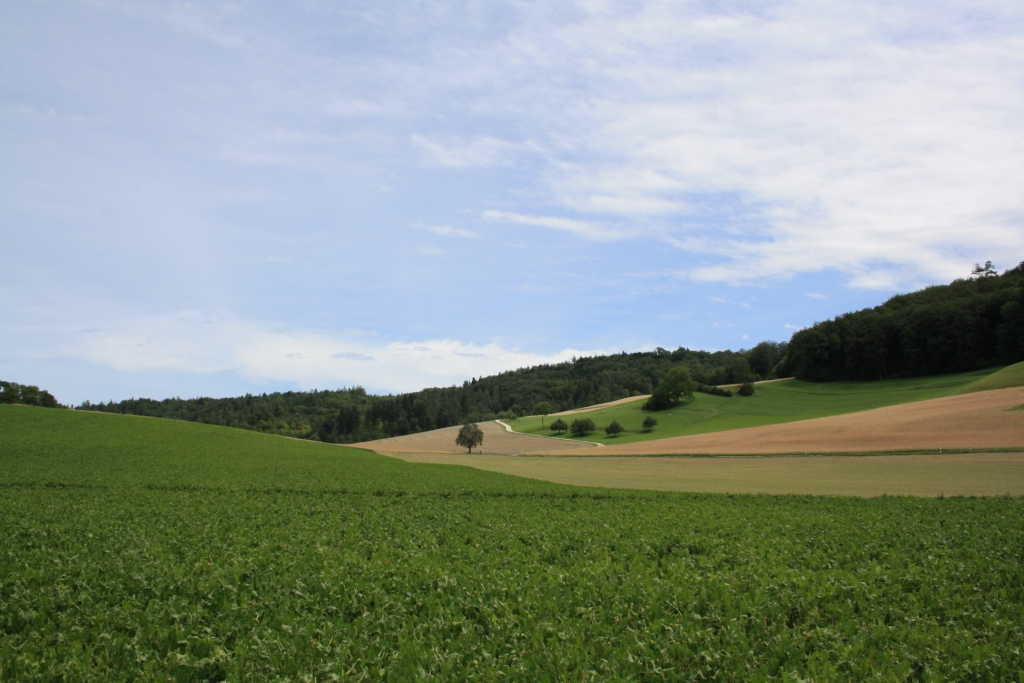
The countryside of the municipality

Egliswil is located in the Lenzburg district, in a depression on the right edge of the lower Seetal valley. The larger village of Seon is 2 km distant (measured from centre-to-centre) — the small Aabach river forms part of the boundary between the municipalities. In Seon is the nearest railway station to Egliswil.

The municipality consists of the haufendorf village (an irregular, unplanned and quite closely packed village, built around a central square) of Egliswil surrounded by some agricultural land and forest. The centre of the village features the Gemeindehaus (the headquarters of the municipality), a primary school and a church.

The municipality has an area, as of 2009, of 6.29 square kilometers (2.43 sq mi). Of this area, 3.28 km^{2} (1.27 sq mi) or 52.1% is used for agricultural purposes, while 2.5 km^{2} (0.97 sq mi) or 39.7% is forested. Of the rest of the land, 0.52 km^{2} (0.20 sq mi) or 8.3% is settled (buildings or roads), 0.02 km^{2} (4.9 acres) or 0.3% is either rivers or lakes and 0.01 km^{2} (2.5 acres) or 0.2% is unproductive land.

Of the built up area, housing and buildings made up 4.1% and transportation infrastructure made up 3.0%. Out of the forested land, all of the forested land area is covered with heavy forests. Of the agricultural land, 35.1% is used for growing crops and 15.4% is pastures, while 1.6% is used for orchards or vine crops. All the water in the municipality is in rivers and streams.

== Coat of arms ==
The blazon of the municipal coat of arms is Azure three fishes fretted Argent between as many Mullets of Five two and one of the same. The coat of arms, which was first used in 1811 in the municipal seal, is due to a misinterpretation of the place name. The Alemanni Egirichswilare refers to the farm estate of Egirich (the "Fear and Loathing Kingdoms"), so has nothing to do with perch (Swiss German: Egli). The stars element is derived from the coat of arms of Aargau and originally — as was the case with the canton's arms — the stars were six-sided.

== Demographics ==
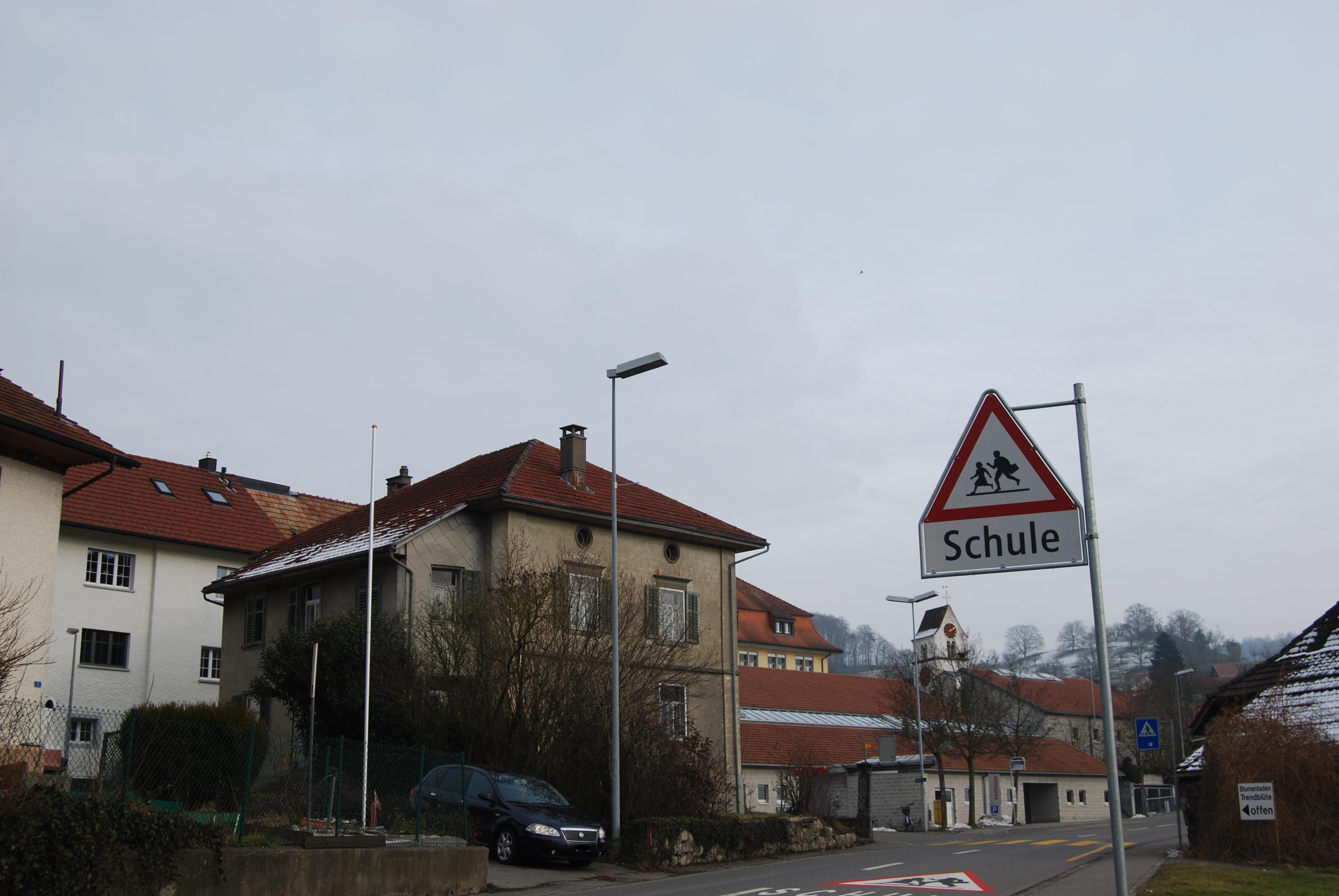
Village centre of Egliswil with the church tower in the background

Egliswil has a population (as of December 2020) of 1,484. As of June 2009, 7.4% of the population are foreign nationals. Over the last 10 years (1997–2007) the population has changed at a rate of 14.8%. Most of the population (as of 2000) speaks German (96.1%), with Serbo-Croatian being second most common (0.8%) and French being third (0.7%).

The age distribution, as of 2008, in Egliswil is; 133 children or 10.2% of the population are between 0 and 9 years old and 177 teenagers or 13.5% are between 10 and 19. Of the adult population, 145 people or 11.1% of the population are between 20 and 29 years old. 163 people or 12.5% are between 30 and 39, 291 people or 22.2% are between 40 and 49, and 194 people or 14.8% are between 50 and 59. The senior population distribution is 95 people or 7.3% of the population are between 60 and 69 years old, 58 people or 4.4% are between 70 and 79, there are 50 people or 3.8% who are between 80 and 89, and there are 3 people or 0.2% who are 90 and older.

As of 2000 the average number of residents per living room was 0.56 which is about equal to the cantonal average of 0.57 per room. In this case, a room is defined as space of a housing unit of at least 4 m^{2} (43 sq ft) as normal bedrooms, dining rooms, living rooms, kitchens and habitable cellars and attics. About 63.2% of the total households were owner occupied, or in other words did not pay rent (though they may have a mortgage or a rent-to-own agreement).

As of 2000, there were 42 homes with 1 or 2 persons in the household, 216 homes with 3 or 4 persons in the household, and 210 homes with 5 or more persons in the household. As of 2000, there were 483 private households (homes and apartments) in the municipality, and an average of 2.5 persons per household. In 2008 there were 269 single family homes (or 48.5% of the total) out of a total of 555 homes and apartments. There were a total of 10 empty apartments for a 1.8% vacancy rate. As of 2007, the construction rate of new housing units was 3.1 new units per 1000 residents.

In the 2007 federal election the most popular party was the SVP which received 41.1% of the vote. The next three most popular parties were the SP (15.3%), the FDP (14.1%) and the CVP (9.5%).

=== Historic population ===
The historical population is given in the following table:

Historical population
Year	Pop.	±%
1850	1,146	—
1900	849	−25.9%
1950	706	−16.8%
1980	722	+2.3%
1990	900	+24.7%
2000	1,210	+34.4%
2010	1,318	+8.9%

== Economy ==
As of 2007, Egliswil had an unemployment rate of 0.84%. As of 2005, there were 49 people employed in the primary economic sector and about 17 businesses involved in this sector. 225 people are employed in the secondary sector and there are 26 businesses in this sector. 110 people are employed in the tertiary sector, with 31 businesses in this sector.

In 2000 there were 648 workers who lived in the municipality. Of these, 525 or about 81.0% of the residents worked outside Egliswil while 222 people commuted into the municipality for work. There were a total of 345 jobs (of at least 6 hours per week) in the municipality. Of the working population, 9.3% used public transportation to get to work, and 62.2% used a private car.

== Religion ==
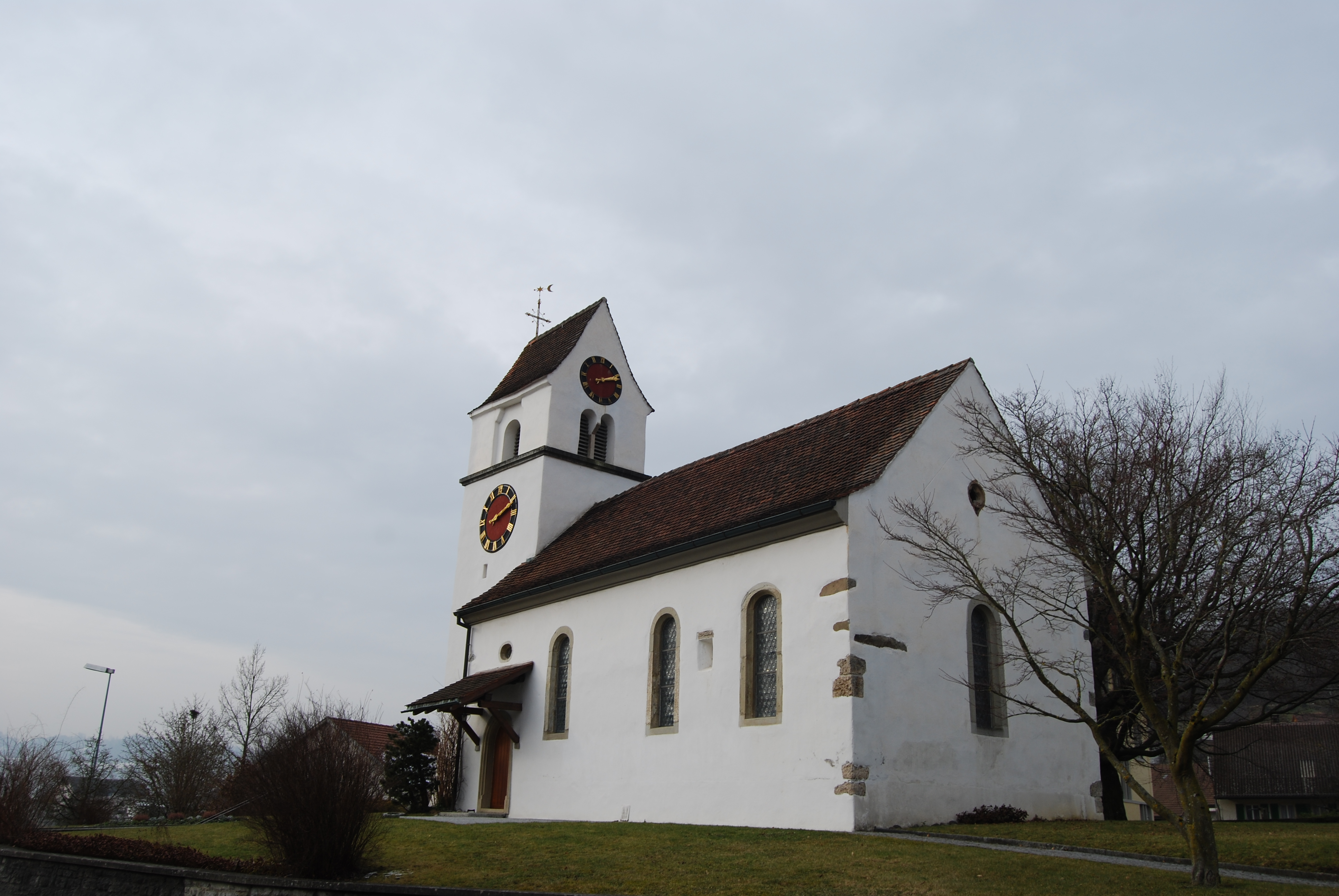
The Reformed Church in the centre of Egliswil

From the 2000 census, 214 or 17.7% were Roman Catholic, while 823 or 68.0% belonged to the Swiss Reformed Church. Of the rest of the population, there was 1 individual who belonged to the Christian Catholic faith.

== Education ==
In Egliswil about 84.1% of the population (between age 25-64) have completed either non-mandatory upper secondary education or additional higher education (either university or a Fachhochschule). Of the school age population (in the 2008/2009 school year), there are 117 students attending primary school in the municipality. Egliswil is home to a primary school and a public library; the library has (as of 2008) 5,103 books or other media, and loaned out 14,391 items in that year, in which it was open a total of 120 days with average of 6 hours per week.
