= Rupperswil =

- Municipality
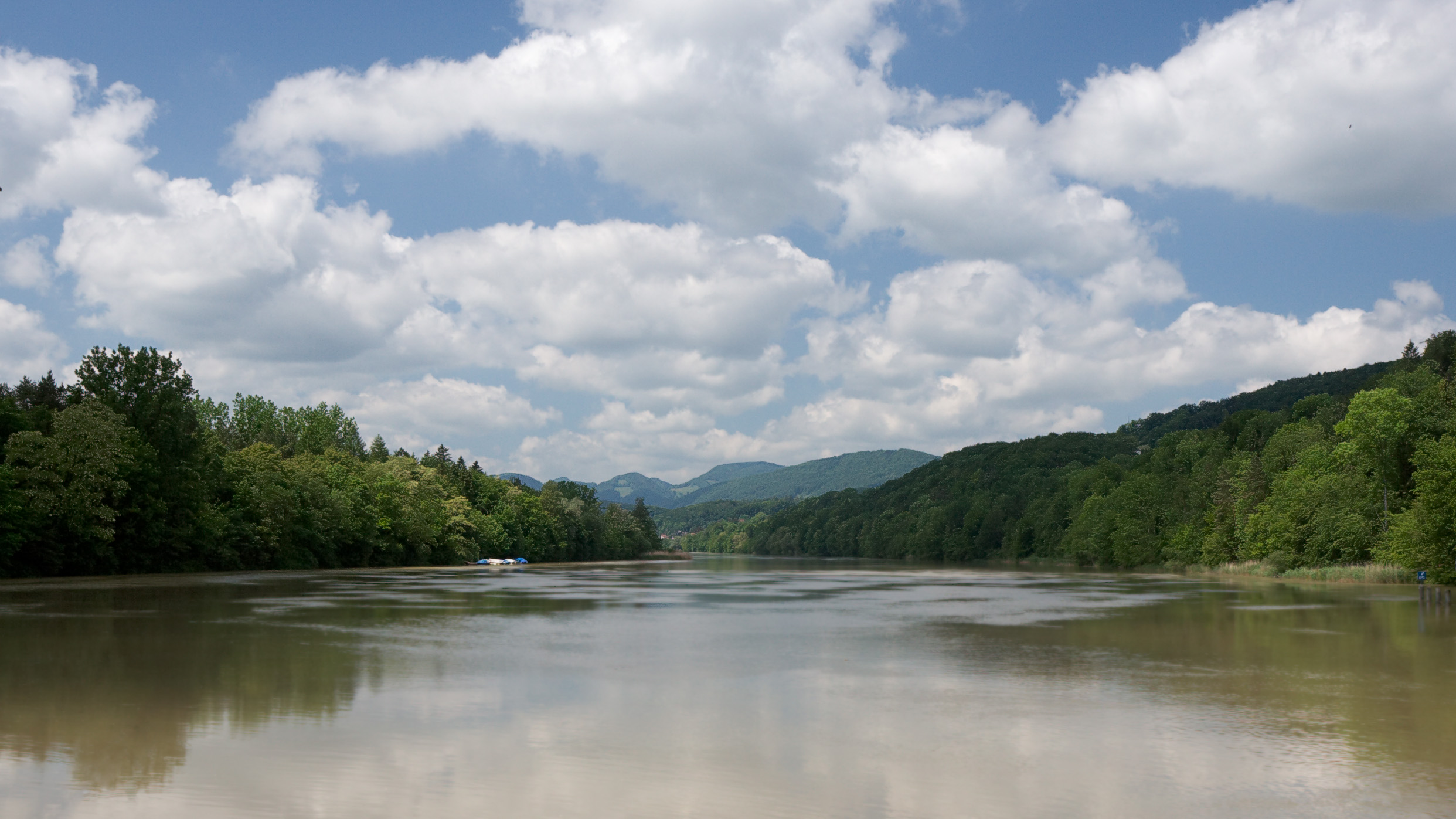

- Flag Coat of arms
- Location of Rupperswil
- Location within Switzerland Location within Canton of Aargau
- Coordinates: 47°24′N 8°8′E
- Country: Switzerland
- Canton: Aargau
- District: Lenzburg

Area
  - Total: 6.21 km^{2} (2.40 sq mi)
- Elevation: 373 m (1,224 ft)

Population (December 2006)
  - Total: 4,077
  - Density: 657/km^{2} (1,700/sq mi)
- Time zone: UTC+01:00 (CET)
  - Summer (DST): UTC+02:00 (CEST)
- Postal code: 5102
- SFOS number: 4206
- ISO 3166 code: CH-AG
- Surrounded by: Auenstein, Biberstein, Buchs, Hunzenschwil, Lenzburg, Möriken-Wildegg, Niederlenz, Rohr, Schafisheim, Staufen, Suhr
- Website: www.rupperswil.ch

Rupperswil is a municipality in the district of Lenzburg in the canton of Aargau in Switzerland.

== History ==
Aerial view (1958)

A partially preserved Roman-era tile kiln from the 2nd century was discovered in 1911. There is also evidence of the emergence of a late-Alamanni village in the 8th century. The modern village of Rupperswil is first mentioned in 1173 as Rubeswile. It belonged to the realm of Lenzburg and passed from the Lenzburg family to the Kyburgs then in 1273 to the rule of the Habsburgs. After the conquest of the Aargau in 1415 it became part of the Bernese District (German: Hochgerichtsbezirk) of Lenzburg. Around the beginning of the 13th to the mid-14th century, the Lords of Rubiswile, a Kyburg Ministerialis family (unfree knights in the service of another lord) is mentioned. They were the first Twingherren of Rupperswil. The Twingherrschaft was acquired between 1295 and 1312 by the Lords of Baldegg which then passed to the Lords of Reinach, and finally to the Lords of Hallwyl. In 1521 they sold the rights to low justice to Bern. Under the Bernese Bailiwick of Lenzburg, Rupperswil was the center of a lower court district. In 1803 Rupperswil became part of the newly created Canton of Aargau.

Ecclesiastically, until 1681 Rupperswil belonged to a parish of Suhr. In 1528 the city converted during the Protestant Reformation. From 1676 to 1681, the Gem tried, eventually successfully, to create a separate parish. The village church was built from donations by the villagers between 1275 and 1370. In 1500 a choir and tower were added to the building. In 1921–22 the old church was replaced by a new building.

In the early 19th century the textile industry increasingly changed the formerly agricultural village. A spinning mill was established in 1836, which produced until the 1970s. In 1858, Rupperswil became a station on the railroad line Brugg–Aarau. In 1874, construction began on the Southern Railway line. Starting at the end of the 19th century there were more metal-processing plants and a sugar mill in Rupperswil. This industrial tradition and new businesses lead to a large number of jobs in the industrial sector. In 2004 54% of the population still worked in industry. Since the opening of the A1 Motorway in 1967, the population has grown steadily.

The village was shocked by the 2015 Rupperswil murders.

== Geography ==
Rupperswil has an area, as of 2009, of 6.21 square kilometers (2.40 sq mi). Of this area, 1.85 km^{2} (0.71 sq mi) or 29.8% is used for agricultural purposes, while 2.29 km^{2} (0.88 sq mi) or 36.9% is forested. Of the rest of the land, 1.79 km^{2} (0.69 sq mi) or 28.8% is settled (buildings or roads), 0.21 km^{2} (0.081 sq mi) or 3.4% is either rivers or lakes and 0.01 km^{2} (2.5 acres) or 0.2% is unproductive land.

Of the built-up area, industrial buildings made up 4.5% of the total area while housing and buildings made up 12.4% and transportation infrastructure made up 9.0%. Power and water infrastructure as well as other special developed areas made up 2.1% of the area. Out of the forested land, all of the forested land area is covered with heavy forests. Of the agricultural land, 22.9% is used for growing crops and 5.6% is pastures, while 1.3% is used for orchards or vine crops. All the water in the municipality is in rivers and streams.

The municipality is located in the Lenzburg district, south of the Aare river. It consists of the haufendorf village (an irregular, unplanned and quite closely packed village, built around a central square) of Rupperswil.

== Coat of arms ==
The blazon of the municipal coat of arms is Argent a Bend Azure.

== Demographics ==
Rupperswil has a population (as of December 2020) of 5,618. As of June 2009, 17.9% of the population are foreign nationals. Over the last 10 years (1997–2007) the population has changed at a rate of 15%. Most of the population (as of 2000) speaks German (88.2%), with Italian being second most common ( 3.7%) and Serbo-Croatian being third ( 2.1%).

The age distribution, as of 2008, in Rupperswil is; 433 children or 10.1% of the population are between 0 and 9 years old and 492 teenagers or 11.5% are between 10 and 19. Of the adult population, 573 people or 13.4% of the population are between 20 and 29 years old. 603 people or 14.1% are between 30 and 39, 775 people or 18.1% are between 40 and 49, and 593 people or 13.8% are between 50 and 59. The senior population distribution is 397 people or 9.3% of the population are between 60 and 69 years old, 246 people or 5.7% are between 70 and 79, there are 144 people or 3.4% who are between 80 and 89, and there are 29 people or 0.7% who are 90 and older.

As of 2000, there were 123 homes with 1 or 2 persons in the household, 709 homes with 3 or 4 persons in the household, and 651 homes with 5 or more persons in the household. As of 2000, there were 1,526 private households (homes and apartments) in the municipality, and an average of 2.4 persons per household. In 2008 there were 816 single family homes (or 43.5% of the total) out of a total of 1,874 homes and apartments. There were a total of 11 empty apartments for a 0.6% vacancy rate. As of 2007, the construction rate of new housing units was 9.9 new units per 1000 residents.

In the 2007 federal election the most popular party was the SVP which received 39.6% of the vote. The next three most popular parties were the SP (18%), the FDP (14.4%) and the CVP (7.1%).

The historical population is given in the following table:

Historical population
Year	Pop.	±%
1764	308	—
1798	576	+87.0%
1850	993	+72.4%
1900	1,095	+10.3%
1950	1,998	+82.5%
1970	2,947	+47.5%
2000	3,770	+27.9%

== Sights ==
The Fabrikanlage (factory town) Rupperswil is designated as part of the Inventory of Swiss Heritage Sites.

== Economy ==
As of 2007, Rupperswil had an unemployment rate of 2.03%. As of 2005, there were 74 people employed in the primary economic sector and about 13 businesses involved in this sector. 1,000 people are employed in the secondary sector and there are 66 businesses in this sector. 779 people are employed in the tertiary sector, with 119 businesses in this sector.

In 2000 there were 1,986 workers who lived in the municipality. Of these, 1,452 or about 73.1% of the residents worked outside Rupperswil while 1,068 people commuted into the municipality for work. There were a total of 1,602 jobs (of at least 6 hours per week) in the municipality. Of the working population, 13.7% used public transportation to get to work, and 53.8% used a private car.

== Religion ==
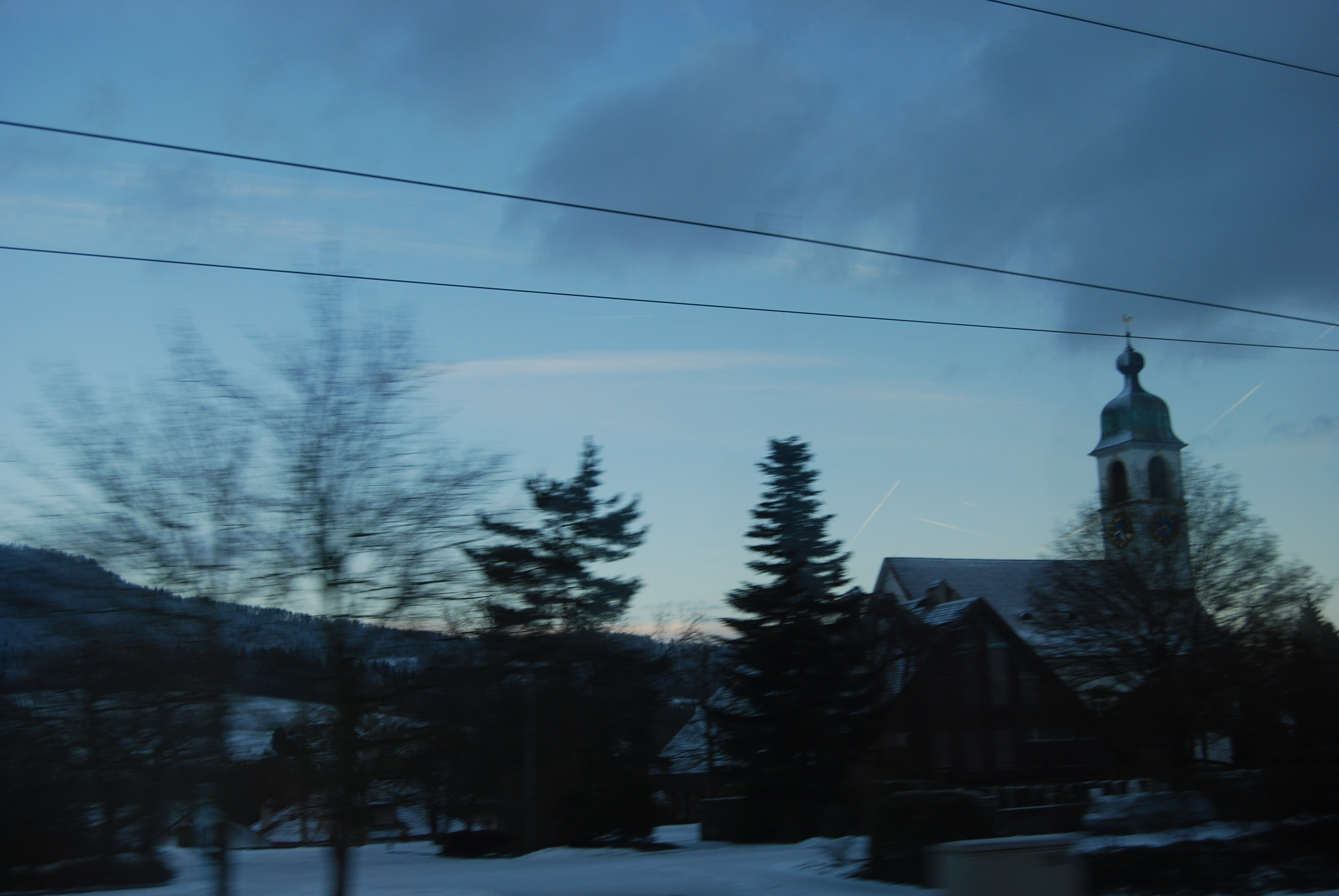
Rupperswil church

From the 2000 census, 969 or 25.7% were Roman Catholic, while 2,008 or 53.3% belonged to the Swiss Reformed Church. Of the rest of the population, there were 5 individuals (or about 0.13% of the population) who belonged to the Christian Catholic faith.

== Transport ==
Rupperswil sits on several railway lines and is served by trains at Rupperswil railway station.

== Education ==
In Rupperswil about 72.9% of the population (between age 25 and 64) have completed either non-mandatory upper secondary education or additional higher education (either university or a Fachhochschule). Of the school age population (in the 2008/2009 school year), there are 259 students attending primary school, there are 97 students attending secondary school in the municipality. Rupperswil is home to the Schul und Gemeinde Bibliothek Rupperswil (school and municipal library of Rupperswil). The library has (as of 2008) 8,404 books or other media, and loaned out 19,476 items in the same year. It was open a total of 240 days with average of 8.5 hours per week during that year.
