= Aabach (Seetal) =

River in Switzerland

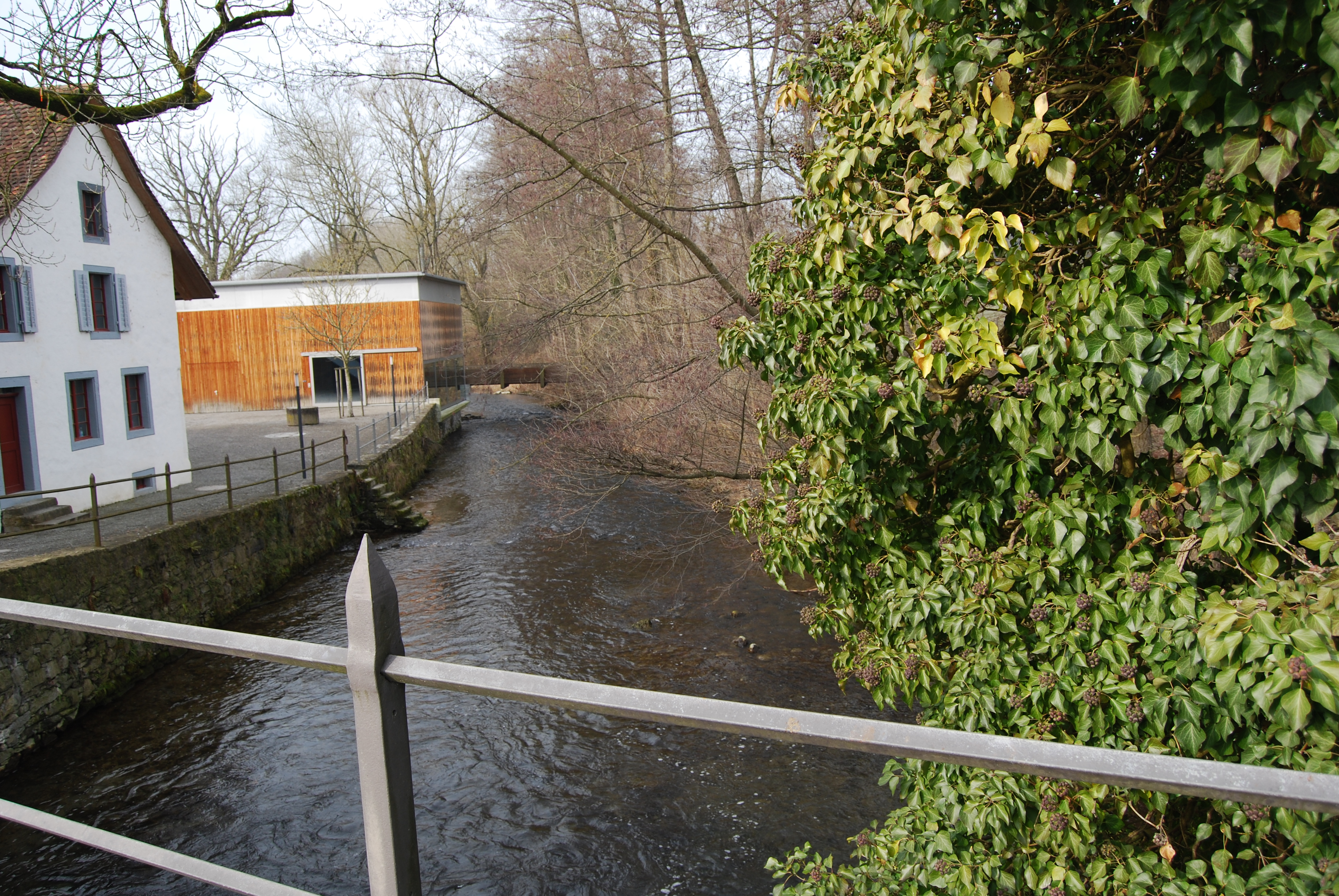
- The Aabach after it leaves Lake Hallwill, just north of Hallwyl Castle

Location
- Country: Switzerland

Physical characteristics
- Mouth: Aare
  - coordinates: 47.4176°N 8.1618°E

Basin features
- Progression: Aare→ Rhine→ North Sea

The Aabach is a small river that runs through the Swiss cantons of Lucerne and Aargau, in the Aare catchment area. It flows from south to north through the valley called Seetal (lit.: Lake Valley) and ends in the Aare.

== Course ==
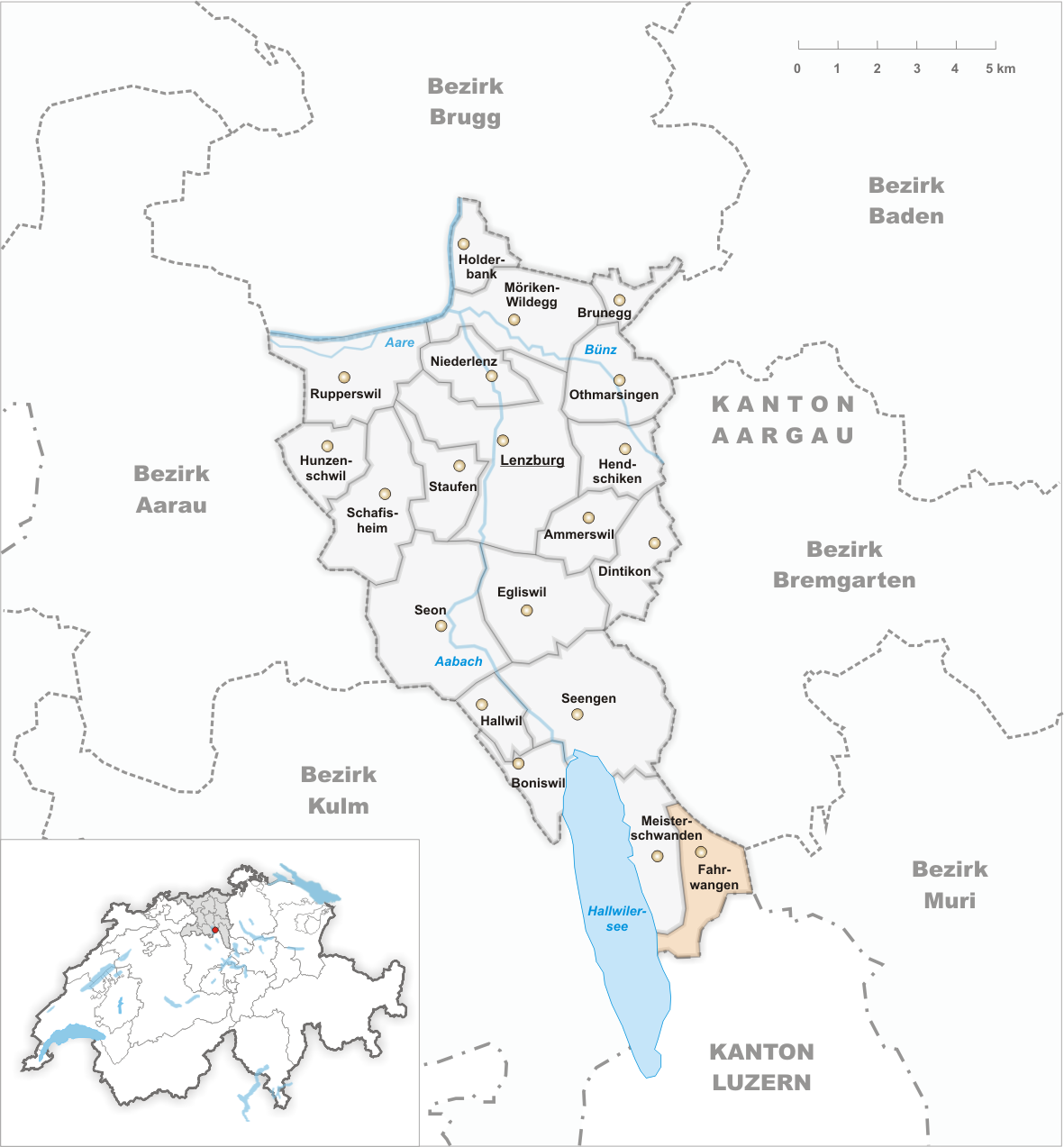
The northern (downstream) course of the Aabach from Lake Hallwill to the Aar.

The Aabach has its origin in Lake Baldegg, which is fed by the Ron and a number of smaller streams. In the village of Mosen it empties into Lake Hallwil (the Hallwilersee). The Aabach leaves the lake between the villages of Boniswil and Seengen. Hallwyl Castle, one of the most important water-controlling castles in Switzerland, sits in the middle of the river on two artificial islands, about 700 metres (2,300 ft) north of the northern end of the lake.

On the southern outskirts of Lenzburg a tunnel takes much of the flow of the Aabach under the town to rejoin the river in Niederlenz township. It was built as a relief tunnel to mitigate flooding in the town, which had been occasionally severe during the spring runoff. Further on, in the village of Wildegg, the Aabach finally joins the Aare, right after it was joined from the right by its major tributary, the Bünz, just about 230 metres (750 ft) upstream.

== Economy ==
Beginning in the second half of the 18th century, the Aabach provided water-power that ran mills that led to the creation of industry in the valley. these included the cotton-mill in Seon, the copper wire works in Wildegg, the Hämmerli arms factory in Lenzburg, and the Wisa-Gloria works in Lenzburg.
