= Ammerswil =

- Municipality
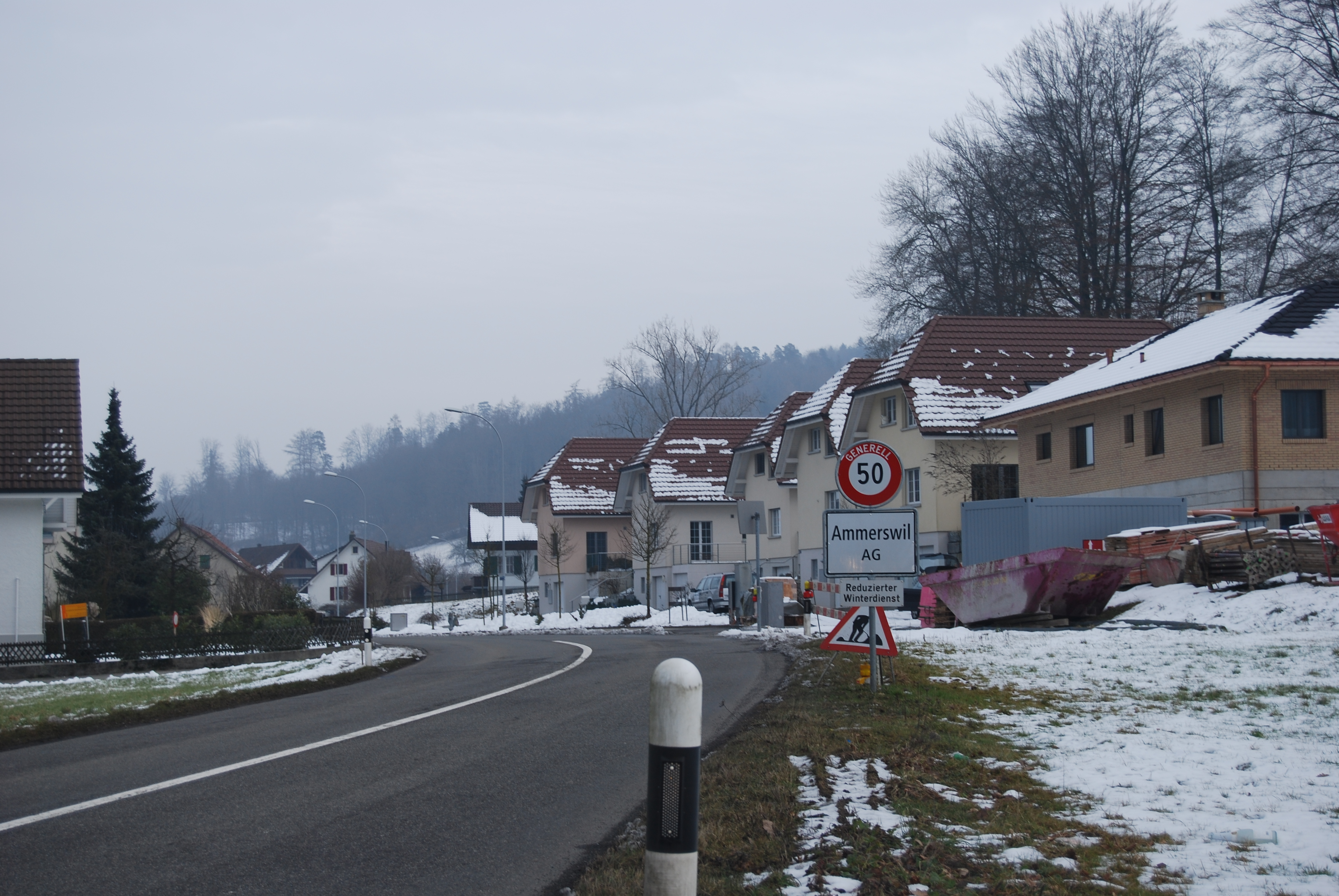

- Flag Coat of arms
- Location of Ammerswil
- Location within Switzerland Location within Canton of Aargau
- Coordinates: 47°22′N 8°12′E
- Country: Switzerland
- Canton: Aargau
- District: Lenzburg

Area
  - Total: 3.19 km^{2} (1.23 sq mi)
- Elevation: 452 m (1,483 ft)

Population (December 2020)
  - Total: 735
  - Density: 230/km^{2} (597/sq mi)
- Time zone: UTC+01:00 (CET)
  - Summer (DST): UTC+02:00 (CEST)
- Postal code: 5600
- SFOS number: 4191
- ISO 3166 code: CH-AG
- Surrounded by: Dintikon, Egliswil, Hendschiken, Lenzburg
- Website: www.ammerswil.ch

Ammerswil is a municipality in the district of Lenzburg in the canton of Aargau in Switzerland. It is located 3 km (2 mi) southeast of the town of Lenzburg.

== History ==
While some scattered Neolithic items have been discovered in Ammerswil, the first known settlement was an Alamannic farmhouse. The village of Ammerswil is first mentioned in 924 as Onpretiswilare. In 1306 it was mentioned as Ombrechtzwile. It was ruled successively by the Counts of Lenzburg, Kyburg and Habsburg, and then in 1415 by the city-state of Bern. Starting in the 13th century, the rights to low justice and tithes were held by the Lords of Hallwyl. In the 14th century, these rights changed hands several times (the Freiherr of Fridingen, Freiherr of Grünenberg and the Lords of Ballmoos). In 1484 these rights transferred to Bern, which annexed Ammerwil into the court of Othmarsingen in the Lenzburg district (Oberamt Lenzburg).

The Late Romanesque aisleless church was expanded in 1640. It has a barn, and a prebend storehouse. The Classicist rectory was built in 1783 by Carl Ahasver von Sinner.

== Geography ==
Aerial view (1970)

Ammerswil has an area, as of 2009, of 3.19 square kilometers (1.23 sq mi). Of this area, 1.06 km^{2} (0.41 sq mi) or 33.2% is used for agricultural purposes, while 1.85 km^{2} (0.71 sq mi) or 58.0% is forested. Of the rest of the land, 0.29 km^{2} (0.11 sq mi) or 9.1% is settled (buildings or roads).

Of the built up area, housing and buildings made up 6.3% and transportation infrastructure made up 1.9%. Out of the forested land, all of the forested land area is covered with heavy forests. Of the agricultural land, 23.2% is used for growing crops and 9.4% is pastures.

The municipality is located in the Lenzburg district, in a side valley between the Bünz and See valleys. It is surrounded by woods except in the north-west. A new housing development from the 1970s and 1980s has somewhat replaced the original village square as the main village center.

== Coat of arms ==
The blazon of the municipal coat of arms is Argent a Semi Deer rampant issuant Gules from Coupeaux Vert.

== Demographics ==
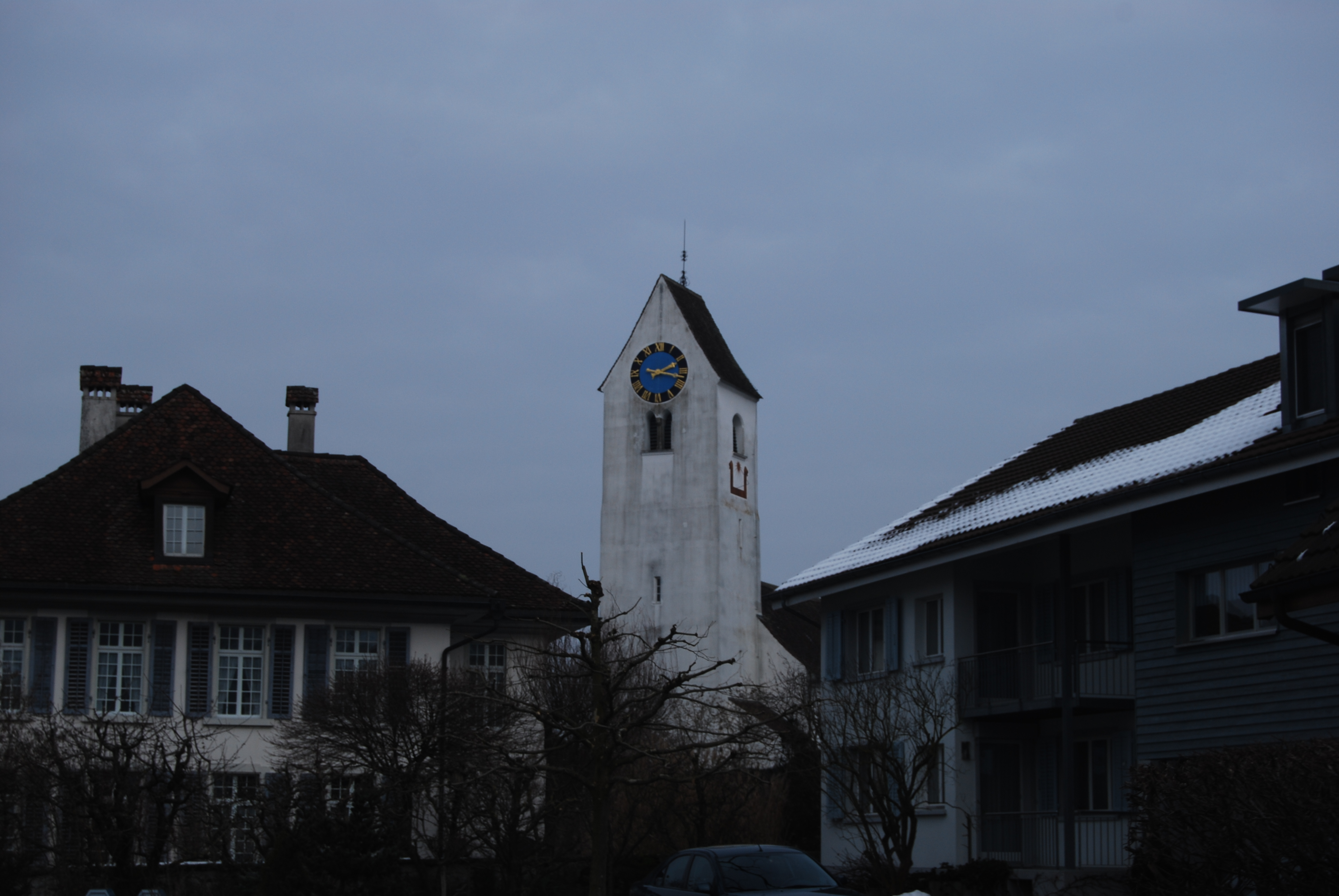
Church and village center of Ammerswil

Ammerswil has a population (as of December 2020) of 735. As of June 2009, 10.8% of the population are foreign nationals. Over the last 10 years (1997–2007) the population has changed at a rate of 24.5%. Most of the population (as of 2000) speaks German (96.6%), with Italian being second most common ( 1.6%) and Portuguese being third ( 0.8%).

The age distribution, as of 2008, in Ammerswil is; 65 children or 9.9% of the population are between 0 and 9 years old and 87 teenagers or 13.2% are between 10 and 19. Of the adult population, 77 people or 11.7% of the population are between 20 and 29 years old. 95 people or 14.4% are between 30 and 39, 135 people or 20.5% are between 40 and 49, and 92 people or 14.0% are between 50 and 59. The senior population distribution is 57 people or 8.6% of the population are between 60 and 69 years old, 35 people or 5.3% are between 70 and 79, there are 14 people or 2.1% who are between 80 and 89, and there are 2 people or 0.3% who are 90 and older.

As of 2000 the average number of residents per living room was 0.55 which is about equal to the cantonal average of 0.57 per room. In this case, a room is defined as space of a housing unit of at least 4 m^{2} (43 sq ft) as normal bedrooms, dining rooms, living rooms, kitchens and habitable cellars and attics. About 65.6% of the total households were owner occupied, or in other words did not pay rent (though they may have a mortgage or a rent-to-own agreement).

As of 2000, there were 12 homes with 1 or 2 persons in the household, 79 homes with 3 or 4 persons in the household, and 127 homes with 5 or more persons in the household. As of 2000, there were 234 private households (homes and apartments) in the municipality, and an average of 2.6 persons per household. In 2008 there were 164 single family homes (or 62.6% of the total) out of a total of 262 homes and apartments. There were a total of 1 empty apartments for a 0.4% vacancy rate. As of 2007, the construction rate of new housing units was 9.2 new units per 1000 residents.

In the 2007 federal election the most popular party was the SVP which received 40.4% of the vote. The next three most popular parties were the SP (20.5%), the FDP (12.1%) and the Green Party (10.7%).

In Ammerswil about 81.4% of the population (between age 25-64) have completed either non-mandatory upper secondary education or additional higher education (either university or a Fachhochschule). Of the school age population (in the 2008/2009 school year), there are 45 students attending primary school in the municipality.

The historical population is given in the following table:

Historical population
Year	Pop.	±%
1798	208	—
1850	295	+41.8%
1860	312	+5.8%
1900	332	+6.4%
1930	326	−1.8%
1950	298	−8.6%
1960	327	+9.7%
1970	345	+5.5%
1980	317	−8.1%
1990	421	+32.8%
2000	609	+44.7%

== Heritage sites of national significance ==
The Pfrundspeicher (Prebendary store house) on Hendschikerstrasse is listed as a Swiss heritage site of national significance.

== Economy ==
As of 2007, Ammerswil had an unemployment rate of 1.28%. As of 2005, there were 50 people employed in the primary economic sector and about 9 businesses involved in this sector. 14 people are employed in the secondary sector and there are 6 businesses in this sector. 37 people are employed in the tertiary sector, with 18 businesses in this sector.

In 2000 there were 326 workers who lived in the municipality. Of these, 274 or about 84.0% of the residents worked outside Ammerswil while 56 people commuted into the municipality for work. There were a total of 108 jobs (of at least 6 hours per week) in the municipality. Of the working population, 11% used public transportation to get to work, and 66% used a private car.

== Religion ==
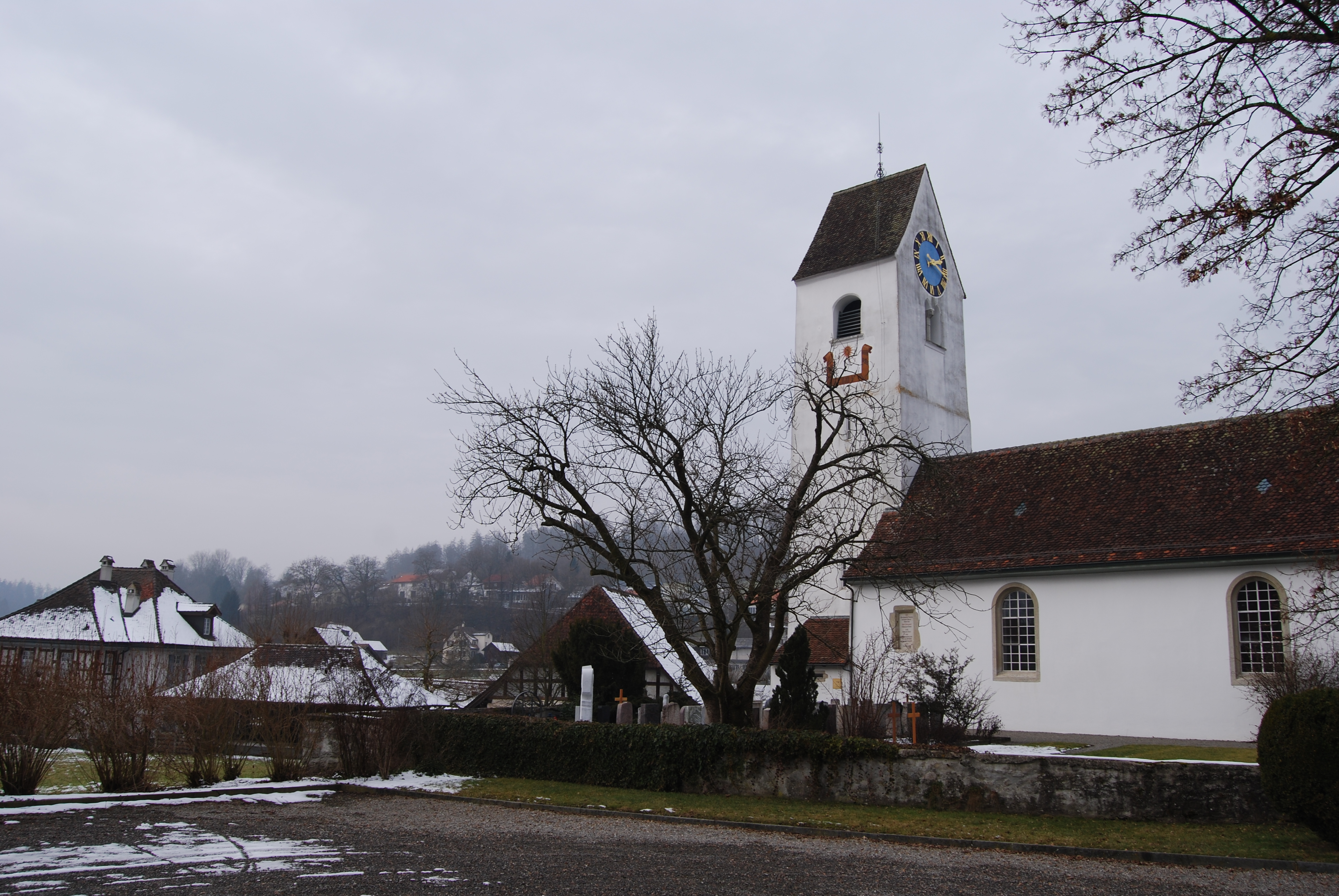
Church of Ammerswil

From the 2000 census, 161 or 26.4% were Roman Catholic, while 363 or 59.6% belonged to the Swiss Reformed Church. Of the rest of the population, there was 1 individual who belonged to the Christian Catholic faith.
