= Hendschiken =

- Municipality
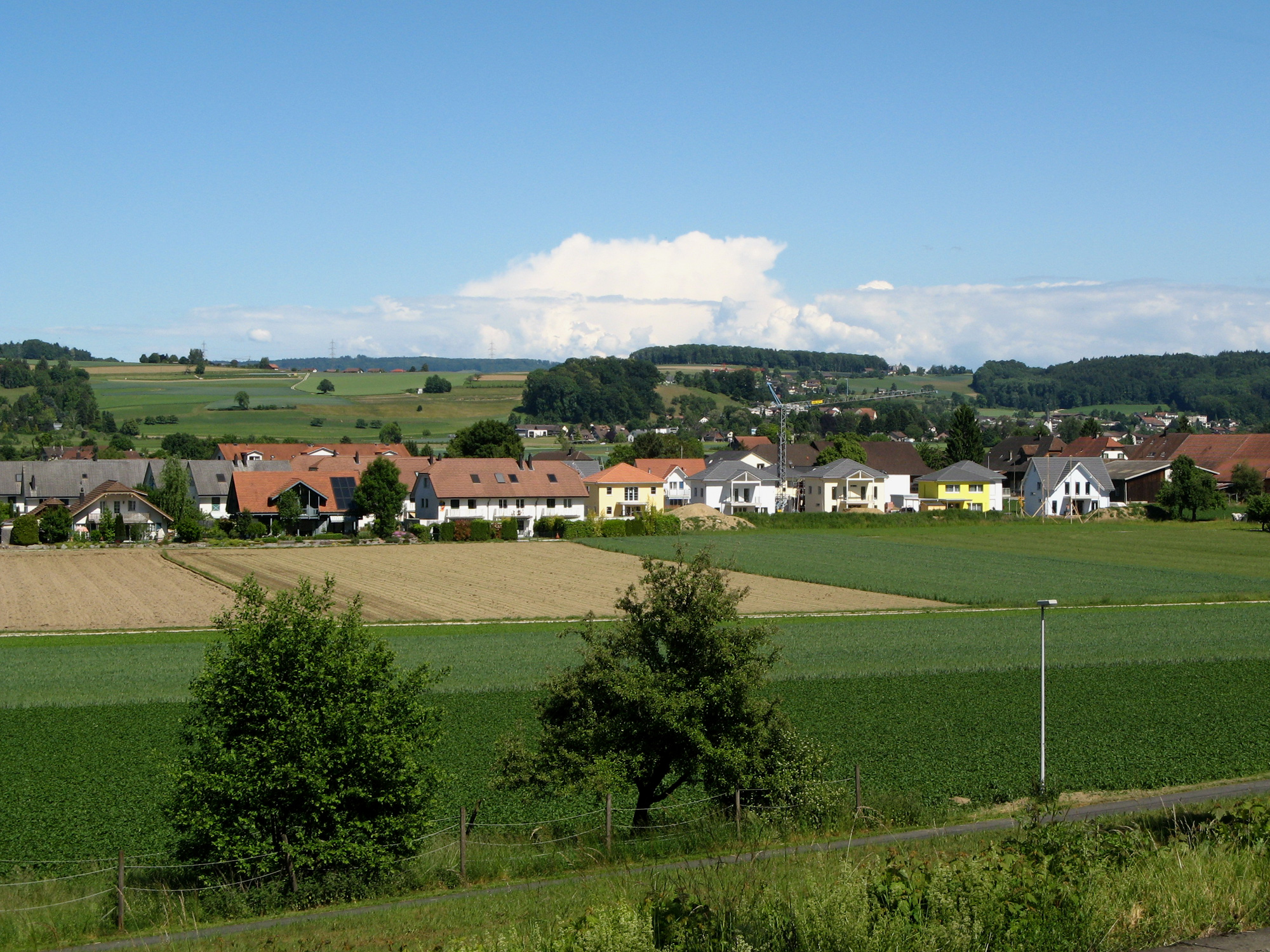

- Flag Coat of arms
- Location of Hendschiken
- Location within Switzerland Location within Canton of Aargau
- Coordinates: 47°23′N 8°13′E
- Country: Switzerland
- Canton: Aargau
- District: Lenzburg

Area
  - Total: 3.52 km^{2} (1.36 sq mi)
- Elevation: 412 m (1,352 ft)

Population (December 2006)
  - Total: 931
  - Density: 264/km^{2} (685/sq mi)
- Time zone: UTC+01:00 (CET)
  - Summer (DST): UTC+02:00 (CEST)
- Postal code: 5604
- SFOS number: 4198
- ISO 3166 code: CH-AG
- Surrounded by: Ammerswil, Dintikon, Dottikon, Lenzburg, Othmarsingen, Villmergen
- Website: www.hendschiken.ch

Hendschiken is a municipality in the district of Lenzburg in the canton of Aargau in Switzerland.

Aerial view (1970)

== History ==
Hendschiken is first mentioned in 1160 as Hentschikon. During the Middle Ages, the major landowners in Hendschiken included Muri Abbey, Säckingen Abbey and St. Urban Abbey as well as the Counts of Lenzburg and Habsburg. In the 14th century most of the land went to the Habsburg owned Königsfelden Abbey. The right to administer low justice was acquired between 1264-1273 by the Lords of Hallwyl, who held it until 1798. In 1415 the village came under the control of Bern and became part of the Lenzburg district (German: Oberamt Lenzburg). After it became a village in the 15th century, the farmers were allowed to freely choose their Twingherren from among any member of the Hallwyl family. With the Act of Mediation in 1803, Hendschiken joined the newly created Canton of Aargau and became part of the Lenzburg district.

Initially it belonged to the Staufberg parish, but in 1565 it was assigned to the Lenzburg parish.

In the 18th and 19th centuries, the straw plaiting (in Wohlen) and the cotton industry (in Lenzburg) resulted in an economic upswing. In addition to small businesses of the 19th century, in the second half of the 20th century some medium-sized enterprises (paper and plastic packaging, surface technology) set up outside the village. In the 1970s, housing grew because of the proximity to the highway. 1982 saw the inauguration of the church center.

== Geography ==
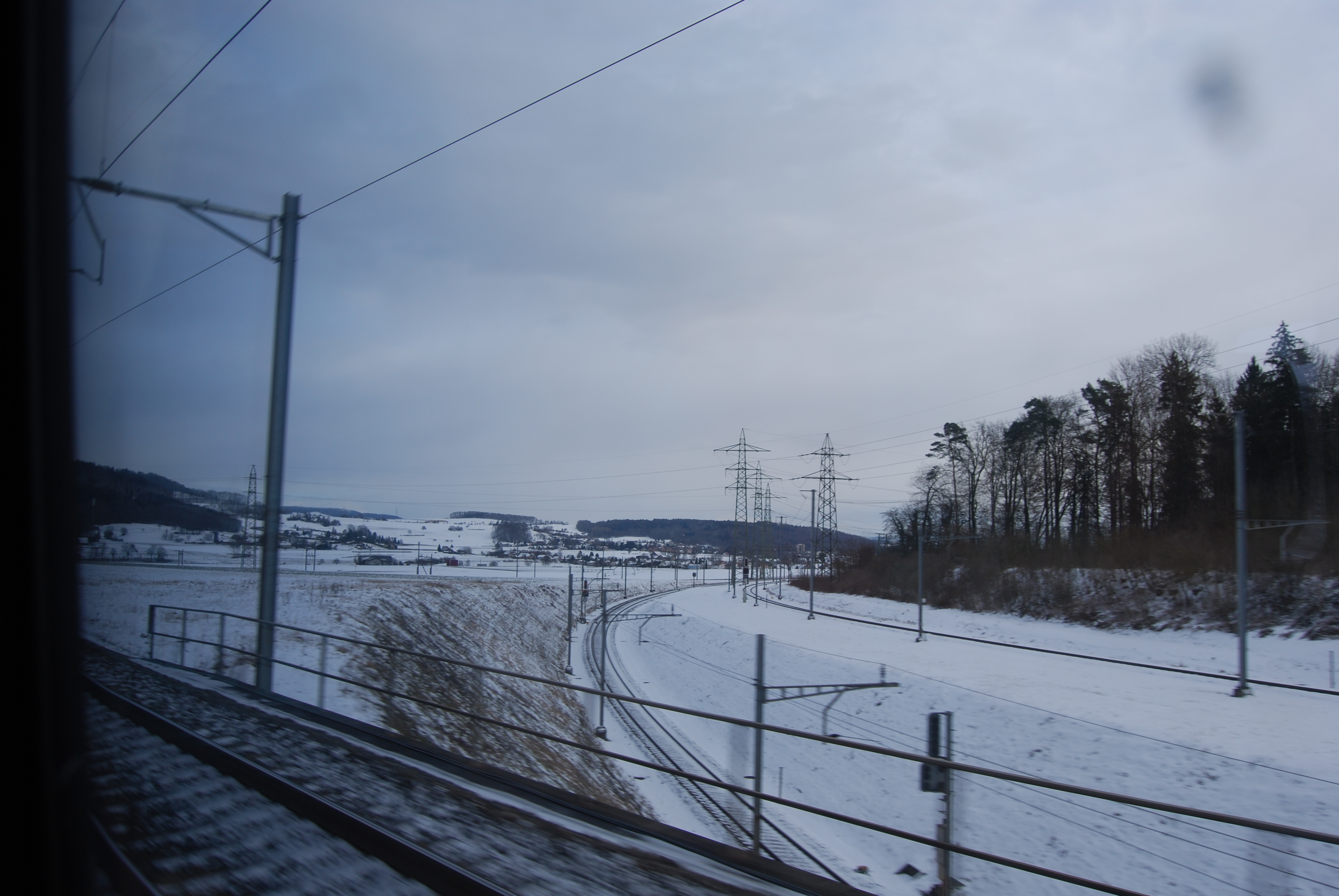
View from train between Lenzbrug and Othmarsingen to Hendschiken and Dottikon

Hendschiken has an area, as of 2009, of 3.52 square kilometers (1.36 sq mi). Of this area, 2.02 km^{2} (0.78 sq mi) or 57.4% is used for agricultural purposes, while 0.86 km^{2} (0.33 sq mi) or 24.4% is forested. Of the rest of the land, 0.62 km^{2} (0.24 sq mi) or 17.6% is settled (buildings or roads), 0.01 km^{2} (2.5 acres) or 0.3% is either rivers or lakes.

Of the built up area, industrial buildings made up 2.0% of the total area while housing and buildings made up 7.4% and transportation infrastructure made up 7.7%. Out of the forested land, all of the forested land area is covered with heavy forests. Of the agricultural land, 50.9% is used for growing crops and 5.4% is pastures, while 1.1% is used for orchards or vine crops. All the water in the municipality is in rivers and streams.

The municipality is located in the Lenzburg district, in the valley on the left bank of the Bünz.. It consists of the village of Hendschiken and the hamlets of Bez. Lenzburg. Einst eine geschlossene Siedlung, heute mehrere voneinander entfernte Dorfteile in der Talebene am linken Ufer der Bünz..

== Coat of arms ==
The blazon of the municipal coat of arms is Azure a Glove sinister Or fingers towards chief.

== Demographics ==
Hendschiken has a population (as of December 2020) of 1,336 As of June 2009, 10.4% of the population are foreign nationals. Over the last 10 years (1997–2007) the population has changed at a rate of 1.9%. Most of the population (as of 2000) speaks German (95.1%), with Italian being second most common ( 1.1%) and Albanian being third ( 0.7%).

The age distribution, as of 2008, in Hendschiken is; 102 children or 10.9% of the population are between 0 and 9 years old and 122 teenagers or 13.0% are between 10 and 19. Of the adult population, 117 people or 12.4% of the population are between 20 and 29 years old. 125 people or 13.3% are between 30 and 39, 179 people or 19.0% are between 40 and 49, and 121 people or 12.9% are between 50 and 59. The senior population distribution is 94 people or 10.0% of the population are between 60 and 69 years old, 47 people or 5.0% are between 70 and 79, there are 30 people or 3.2% who are between 80 and 89, and there are 3 people or 0.3% who are 90 and older.

As of 2000 the average number of residents per living room was 0.53 which is about equal to the cantonal average of 0.57 per room. In this case, a room is defined as space of a housing unit of at least 4 m^{2} (43 sq ft) as normal bedrooms, dining rooms, living rooms, kitchens and habitable cellars and attics. About 61.1% of the total households were owner occupied, or in other words did not pay rent (though they may have a mortgage or a rent-to-own agreement).

As of 2000, there were 23 homes with 1 or 2 persons in the household, 184 homes with 3 or 4 persons in the household, and 158 homes with 5 or more persons in the household. As of 2000, there were 391 private households (homes and apartments) in the municipality, and an average of 2.3 persons per household. In 2008 there were 214 single family homes (or 51.7% of the total) out of a total of 414 homes and apartments. There were a total of 2 empty apartments for a 0.5% vacancy rate. As of 2007, the construction rate of new housing units was 2.2 new units per 1000 residents.

In the 2007 federal election the most popular party was the SVP which received 41.1% of the vote. The next three most popular parties were the SP (18.2%), the FDP (12.4%) and the CVP (10.2%).

The historical population is given in the following table:

Historical population
Year	Pop.	±%
1850	571	—
1900	594	+4.0%
1950	612	+3.0%
2000	896	+46.4%

== Heritage sites of national significance ==
The thatched roof house (German: Strohdachhaus) at Bühlhofstrasse 4 is listed as a Swiss heritage site of national significance.

== Economy ==
As of 2007, Hendschiken had an unemployment rate of 1.56%. As of 2005, there were 43 people employed in the primary economic sector and about 15 businesses involved in this sector. 51 people are employed in the secondary sector and there are 15 businesses in this sector. 213 people are employed in the tertiary sector, with 34 businesses in this sector.

In 2000 there were 487 workers who lived in the municipality. Of these, 398 or about 81.7% of the residents worked outside Hendschiken while 255 people commuted into the municipality for work. There were a total of 344 jobs (of at least 6 hours per week) in the municipality. Of the working population, 10.4% used public transportation to get to work, and 57.3% used a private car.

== Transport ==
Hendschiken has its own railway station, which is located on the Aargau Southern Railway line. The station is served by services of the Aargau S-Bahn and the S42 of the Zurich S-Bahn, which is a rush-hour service.

== Religion ==
From the 2000 census, 226 or 25.2% were Roman Catholic, while 524 or 58.5% belonged to the Swiss Reformed Church. Of the rest of the population, there was 1 individual who belonged to the Christian Catholic faith.

== Education ==
The entire Swiss population is generally well educated. In Hendschiken about 80.1% of the population (between age 25-64) have completed either non-mandatory upper secondary education or additional higher education (either university or a Fachhochschule). Of the school age population (in the 2008/2009 school year), there are 75 students attending primary school in the municipality. Hendschiken is home to the Gemeindebibliotheken und Schulbibliotheken (Municipal and School library). The library has (as of 2008) 3,400 books or other media, and loaned out 2,575 items in the same year. The library was open a total of 12.5 days with average of 2.5 hours per week during that year.
