= Seon, Aargau =

Seon
- Municipality
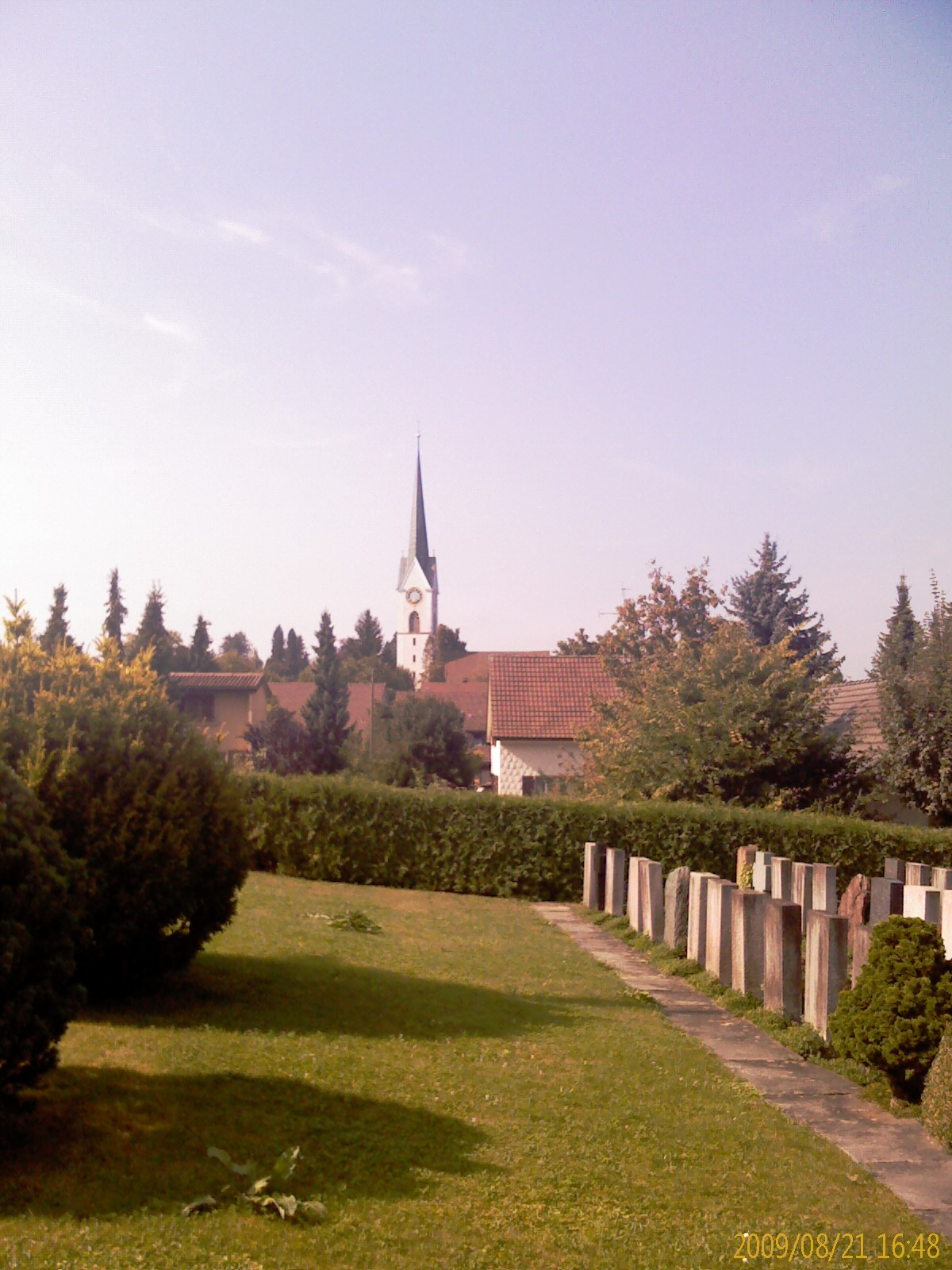

- Flag Coat of arms
- Location of Seon
- Location within Switzerland Location within Canton of Aargau
- Coordinates: 47°21′N 8°10′E
- Country: Switzerland
- Canton: Aargau
- District: Lenzburg

Area
  - Total: 9.61 km^{2} (3.71 sq mi)
- Elevation: 445 m (1,460 ft)

Population (December 2006)
  - Total: 4,582
  - Density: 477/km^{2} (1,230/sq mi)
- Time zone: UTC+01:00 (CET)
  - Summer (DST): UTC+02:00 (CEST)
- Postal code: 5703
- SFOS number: 4209
- ISO 3166 code: CH-AG
- Surrounded by: Dürrenäsch, Egliswil, Gränichen, Hallwil, Lenzburg, Schafisheim, Seengen, Staufen, Teufenthal
- Website: www.seon.ch

Seon is a municipality in the district of Lenzburg in the canton of Aargau in Switzerland.

== Geography ==
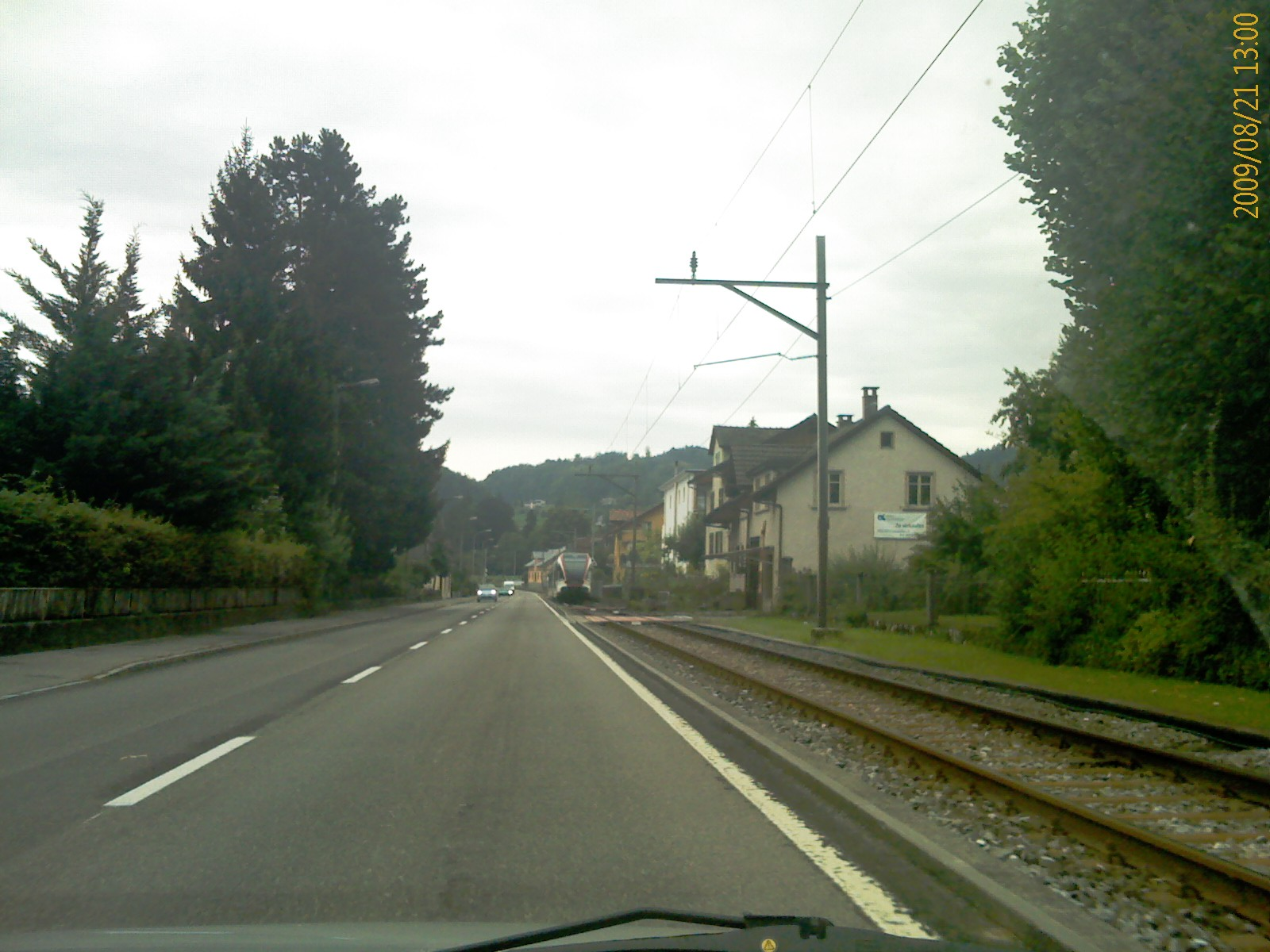
Seon village and railway

Aerial view (1964)

Seon lies within the Seetal valley, on the banks of the Aabach river.

The municipality has an area, as of 2009, of 9.62 square kilometers (3.71 sq mi). Of this area, 4.93 km^{2} (1.90 sq mi) or 51.2% is used for agricultural purposes, while 2.84 km^{2} (1.10 sq mi) or 29.5% is forested. Of the rest of the land, 1.9 km^{2} (0.73 sq mi) or 19.8% is settled (buildings or roads), 0.01 km^{2} (2.5 acres) or 0.1% is either rivers or lakes.

Of the built up area, industrial buildings made up 2.4% of the total area while housing and buildings made up 10.7% and transportation infrastructure made up 4.0%. Power and water infrastructure as well as other special developed areas made up 1.8% of the area Out of the forested land, 28.2% of the total land area is heavily forested and 1.4% is covered with orchards or small clusters of trees. Of the agricultural land, 33.1% is used for growing crops and 16.0% is pastures, while 2.2% is used for orchards or vine crops. All the water in the municipality is in rivers and streams.

== Coat of arms ==
The blazon of the municipal coat of arms is Argent three Helmets Gules.

== Demographics ==
Seon has a population (as of December 2020) of 5,198. As of June 2009, 22.1% of the population are foreign nationals. Over the last 10 years (1997–2007) the population has changed at a rate of -0.2%. Most of the population (as of 2000) speaks German (85.2%), with Turkish being second most common ( 3.7%) and Italian being third ( 3.0%).

The age distribution, as of 2008, in Seon is; 469 children or 10.0% of the population are between 0 and 9 years old and 609 teenagers or 13.0% are between 10 and 19. Of the adult population, 613 people or 13.1% of the population are between 20 and 29 years old. 613 people or 13.1% are between 30 and 39, 794 people or 17.0% are between 40 and 49, and 619 people or 13.2% are between 50 and 59. The senior population distribution is 480 people or 10.2% of the population are between 60 and 69 years old, 304 people or 6.5% are between 70 and 79, there are 150 people or 3.2% who are between 80 and 89, and there are 33 people or 0.7% who are 90 and older.

As of 2000, there were 154 homes with 1 or 2 persons in the household, 878 homes with 3 or 4 persons in the household, and 767 homes with 5 or more persons in the household. As of 2000, there were 1,827 private households (homes and apartments) in the municipality, and an average of 2.5 persons per household. In 2008 there were 852 single family homes (or 41.8% of the total) out of a total of 2,040 homes and apartments. There were a total of 14 empty apartments for a 0.7% vacancy rate. As of 2007, the construction rate of new housing units was 2.2 new units per 1000 residents.

In the 2007 federal election the most popular party was the SVP which received 43.8% of the vote. The next three most popular parties were the SP (15.2%), the FDP (12.5%) and the CVP (8.9%).

The historical population is given in the following table:

Historical population
Year	Pop.	±%
1975	3,597	—
1980	3,805	+5.8%
1990	4,468	+17.4%
2000	4,656	+4.2%

== Heritage sites of national significance ==
Both the former untere Mühle at Unterdorfstrasse 50 and Villa Walti at Oberdorfstrasse 28 are listed as Swiss heritage sites of national significance.

== Economy ==
As of 2007, Seon had an unemployment rate of 1.47%. As of 2005, there were 78 people employed in the primary economic sector and about 23 businesses involved in this sector. 674 people are employed in the secondary sector and there are 60 businesses in this sector. 1,286 people are employed in the tertiary sector, with 184 businesses in this sector.

In 2000 there were 2,457 workers who lived in the municipality. Of these, 1,689 or about 68.7% of the residents worked outside Seon while 1,058 people commuted into the municipality for work. There were a total of 1,826 jobs (of at least 6 hours per week) in the municipality. Of the working population, 11.6% used public transportation to get to work, and 59.4% used a private car.

== Religion ==
From the 2000 census, 1,122 or 23.3% were Roman Catholic, while 2,705 or 56.2% belonged to the Swiss Reformed Church. Of the rest of the population, there were 6 individuals (or about 0.12% of the population) who belonged to the Christian Catholic faith.

== Education ==
In Seon about 70.3% of the population (between age 25-64) have completed either non-mandatory upper secondary education or additional higher education (either university or a Fachhochschule). Of the school age population (in the 2008/2009 school year), there are 322 students attending primary school, there are 187 students attending secondary school, there are 93 students attending tertiary or university level schooling in the municipality. Seon is home to the Schul-und Gemeinde Bibliothek Seon (school and municipal library of Seon). The library has (as of 2008) 15,237 books or other media, and loaned out 54,106 items in the same year. It was open a total of 219 days with average of 12 hours per week during that year.
