= Dintikon =

Municipality in Switzerland

- Municipality
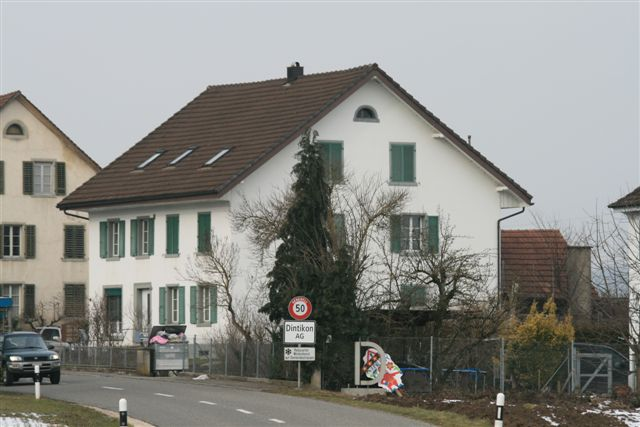

- Flag Coat of arms
- Location of Dintikon
- Location within Switzerland Location within Canton of Aargau
- Coordinates: 47°22′N 8°14′E
- Country: Switzerland
- Canton: Aargau
- District: Lenzburg

Area
  - Total: 3.73 km^{2} (1.44 sq mi)
- Elevation: 449 m (1,473 ft)

Population (December 2006)
  - Total: 1,411
  - Density: 378/km^{2} (980/sq mi)
- Time zone: UTC+01:00 (CET)
  - Summer (DST): UTC+02:00 (CEST)
- Postal code: 5606
- SFOS number: 4194
- ISO 3166 code: CH-AG
- Surrounded by: Ammerswil, Egliswil, Hendschiken, Seengen, Villmergen
- Website: www.dintikon.ch

Dintikon is a municipality in the district of Lenzburg in the canton of Aargau in Switzerland.

The small village is located near Lenzburg and Wohlen.

Aerial view (1964)

== History ==
Dintikon is first mentioned in 924 as Tintinchowa.

== Geography ==
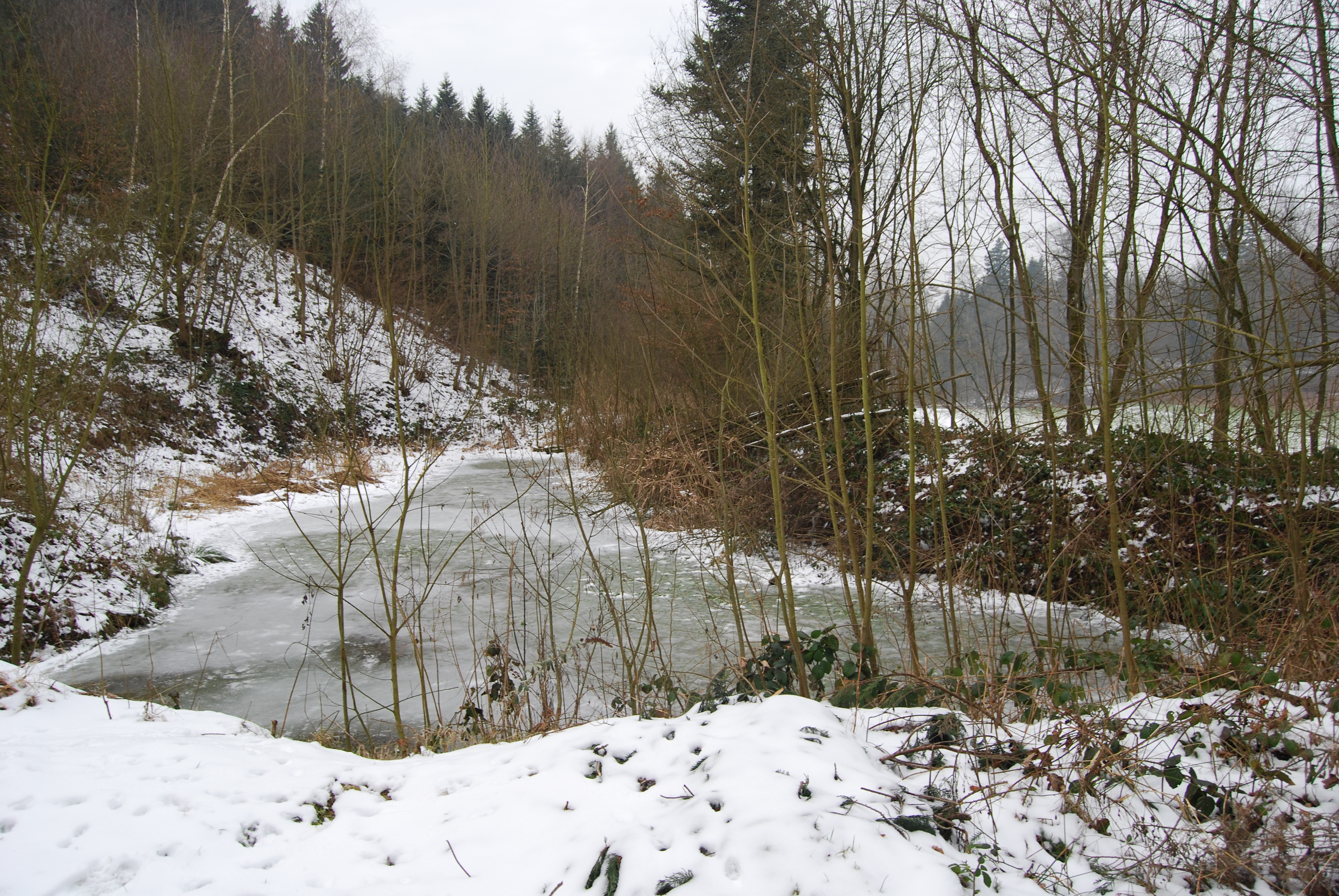
Frozen forest pond at the south side of the road from Ammerswil to Dintikon

Dintikon has an area, as of 2009, of 3.73 square kilometers (1.44 sq mi). Of this area, 1.45 km^{2} (0.56 sq mi) or 38.9% is used for agricultural purposes, while 1.57 km^{2} (0.61 sq mi) or 42.1% is forested. Of the rest of the land, 0.7 km^{2} (0.27 sq mi) or 18.8% is settled (buildings or roads).

Of the built up area, industrial buildings made up 4.0% of the total area while housing and buildings made up 9.9% and transportation infrastructure made up 4.0%. Out of the forested land, all of the forested land area is covered with heavy forests. Of the agricultural land, 18.0% is used for growing crops and 19.3% is pastures, while 1.6% is used for orchards or vine crops.

The municipality is located in the Lenzburg district, from the eastern edge of the Rietenberg to the edge of the Bünztal (Bünz valley).

== Coat of arms ==
The blazon of the municipal coat of arms is Sable on a Bend sinister three Roses Gules barbed and seeded proper.

== Demographics ==
Dintikon has a population (as of December 2020) of 2,317. As of June 2009, 19.0% of the population are foreign nationals. Over the last 10 years (1997–2007) the population has changed at a rate of 28.9%. Most of the population (as of 2000) speaks German (93.0%), with Italian being second most common ( 2.8%) and Albanian being third ( 0.9%).

The age distribution, as of 2008, in Dintikon is; 217 children or 12.1% of the population are between 0 and 9 years old and 227 teenagers or 12.7% are between 10 and 19. Of the adult population, 234 people or 13.0% of the population are between 20 and 29 years old. 247 people or 13.8% are between 30 and 39, 326 people or 18.2% are between 40 and 49, and 254 people or 14.2% are between 50 and 59. The senior population distribution is 167 people or 9.3% of the population are between 60 and 69 years old, 78 people or 4.3% are between 70 and 79, there are 38 people or 2.1% who are between 80 and 89, and there are 6 people or 0.3% who are 90 and older.

As of 2000 the average number of residents per living room was 0.56 which is about equal to the cantonal average of 0.57 per room. In this case, a room is defined as space of a housing unit of at least 4 m^{2} (43 sq ft) as normal bedrooms, dining rooms, living rooms, kitchens and habitable cellars and attics. About 66.7% of the total households were owner occupied, or in other words did not pay rent (though they may have a mortgage or a rent-to-own agreement).

As of 2000, there were 33 homes with 1 or 2 persons in the household, 197 homes with 3 or 4 persons in the household, and 250 homes with 5 or more persons in the household. As of 2000, there were 506 private households (homes and apartments) in the municipality, and an average of 2.6 persons per household. In 2008 there were 306 single family homes (or 42.9% of the total) out of a total of 714 homes and apartments. There were a total of 5 empty apartments for a 0.7% vacancy rate. As of 2007, the construction rate of new housing units was 64.5 new units per 1000 residents.

In the 2007 federal election the most popular party was the SVP which received 44.5% of the vote. The next three most popular parties were the FDP (19.3%), the SP (11.8%) and the CVP (8.6%).

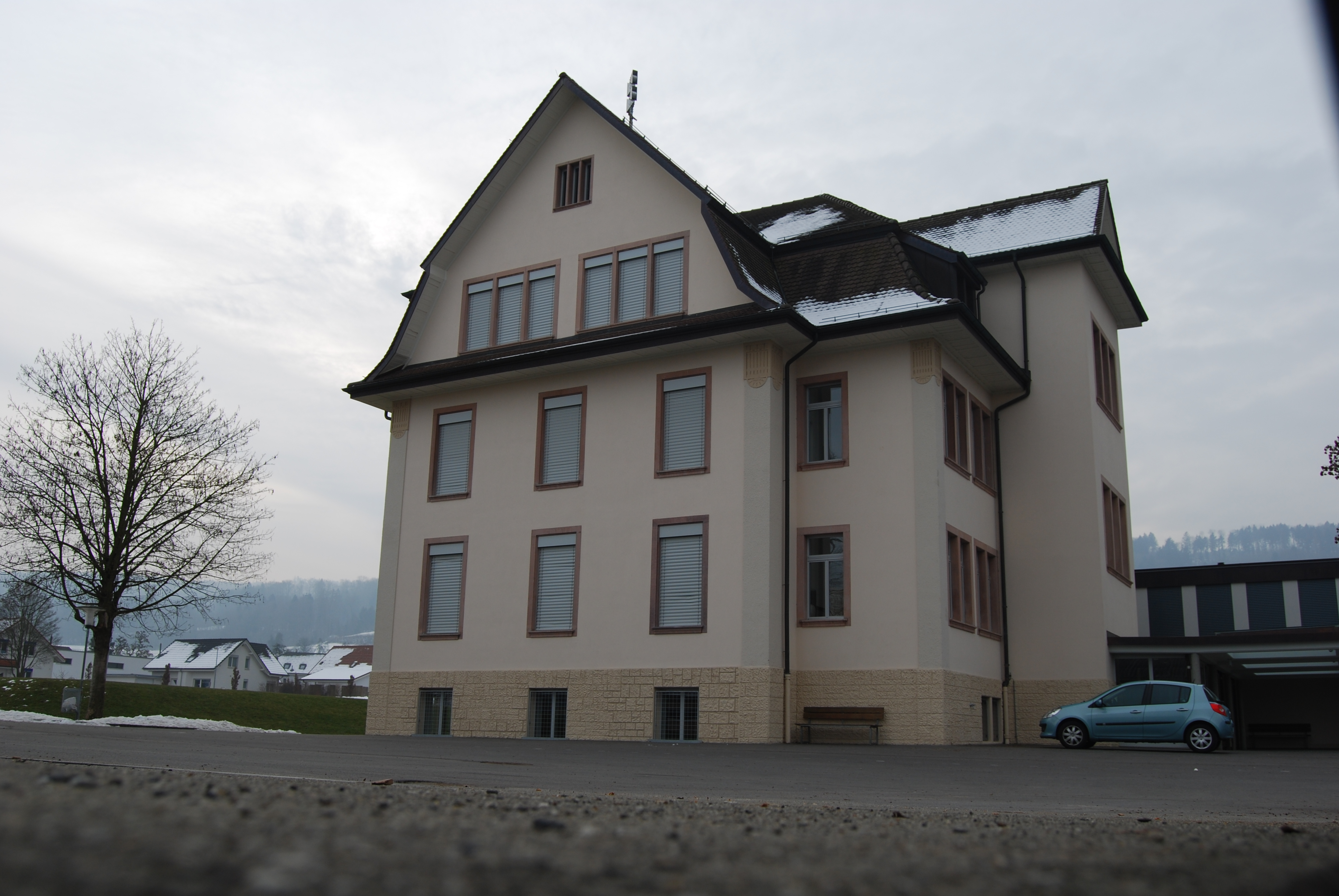
Dintikon school

The entire Swiss population is generally well educated. In Dintikon about 75.1% of the population (between age 25-64) have completed either non-mandatory upper secondary education or additional higher education (either university or a Fachhochschule). Of the school age population (in the 2008/2009 school year), there are 163 students attending primary school in the municipality.

The historical population is given in the following table:

Historical population
Year	Pop.	±%
1850	673	—
1900	524	−22.1%
1950	783	+49.4%
2000	1,307	+66.9%

== Economy ==
As of 2007, Dintikon had an unemployment rate of 2%. As of 2005, there were 44 people employed in the primary economic sector and about 12 businesses involved in this sector. 206 people are employed in the secondary sector and there are 25 businesses in this sector. 897 people are employed in the tertiary sector, with 53 businesses in this sector.

In 2000 there were 724 workers who lived in the municipality. Of these, 548 or about 75.7% of the residents worked outside Dintikon while 900 people commuted into the municipality for work. There were a total of 1,076 jobs (of at least 6 hours per week) in the municipality. Of the working population, 9.3% used public transportation to get to work, and 59.8% used a private car.

== Transport ==
Dintikon shares a railway station with Dottikon. The station is located on the Aargau Southern Railway line and is served by services of the Aargau S-Bahn and the S42 of the Zurich S-Bahn, which is a rush-hour service.

== Religion ==
From the 2000 census, 485 or 37.1% were Roman Catholic, while 630 or 48.2% belonged to the Swiss Reformed Church.
