= Lenzburg District =

Coordinates: 47°23′N 8°10′E

Lenzburg District Bezirk Lenzburg
- District
- Flag Coat of arms
- Country: Switzerland
- Canton: Aargau
- Capital: Lenzburg

Area
  - Total: 102.71 km^{2} (39.66 sq mi)

Population (2020)
  - Total: 65,707
  - Density: 639.73/km^{2} (1,656.9/sq mi)
- Time zone: UTC+1 (CET)
  - Summer (DST): UTC+2 (CEST)
- Municipalities: 20

Lenzburg District is a district of the Canton of Aargau in Switzerland, lying at the center of the canton. The district capital is the town of Lenzburg. It has a population of 65,707 (as of 31 December 2020).

== Geography ==
The Lenzburg district has an area, as of 2009, of 102.71 square kilometers (39.66 sq mi). Of this area, 42.6 km^{2} (16.4 sq mi) or 41.5% is used for agricultural purposes, while 34.14 km^{2} (13.18 sq mi) or 33.2% is forested. Of the rest of the land, 20.16 km^{2} (7.78 sq mi) or 19.6% is settled (buildings or roads).

== Coat of arms ==
The blazon of the district coat of arms is Argent a Hurt.

== Demographics ==
Bezirk Lenzburg has a population (as of December 2020) of 65,707. As of June 2009, 19.7% of the population are foreign nationals.

== Economy ==
In 2000 there were 24,407 workers who lived in the district. Of these, 18,072 or about 74.0% of the residents worked outside the Lenzburg district while 14,959 people commuted into the district for work. There were a total of 21,294 jobs (of at least 6 hours per week) in the district.

== Religion ==
From the 2000 census, 12,952 or 27.9% were Roman Catholic, while 23,937 or 51.6% belonged to the Swiss Reformed Church. Of the rest of the population, there were 45 individuals (or about 0.10% of the population) who belonged to the Christian Catholic faith.

== Education ==
Of the school age population (in the 2008/2009 school year), there are 3,695 students attending primary school, there are 1,569 students attending secondary school, there are 971 students attending tertiary or university level schooling, and there are 12 students who are seeking a job after school in the municipality.

== Municipalities ==
The district contains a total of 20 municipalities:

Coat of arms	Municipality	Population (31 December 2020)	Area, km^{2}
Ammerswil	Ammerswil	735	3.19
Boniswil	Boniswil	1,520	2.78
Brunegg	Brunegg	866	1.56
Dintikon	Dintikon	2,317	3.73
Egliswil	Egliswil	1,484	6.29
Fahrwangen	Fahrwangen	2,338	5.00
Hallwil	Hallwil	949	2.18
Hendschiken	Hendschiken	1,336	3.52
Holderbank	Holderbank	1,408	2.32
Hunzenschwil	Hunzenschwil	4,209	3.27
Lenzburg	Lenzburg	11,024	11.33
Meisterschwanden	Meisterschwanden	3,032	6.86
Möriken-Wildegg	Möriken-Wildegg	4,561	6.62
Niederlenz	Niederlenz	4,841	3.26
Othmarsingen	Othmarsingen	3,037	4.71
Rupperswil	Rupperswil	5,618	6.22
Schafisheim	Schafisheim	3,044	6.33
Seengen	Seengen	4,122	10.35
Seon	Seon	5,198	9.61
Staufen	Staufen	4,068	3.58
Total		65,707	102.75
