= Bünz =

River in Switzerland

Coordinates: 47°25′N 8°09′E

The Bünz is a 26-kilometre-long river in the Swiss canton of Aargau and a southeastern and right tributary of the Seetaler Aabach. It flows from south to north through the Aargau districts of Muri, Bremgarten and Lenzburg.
