= Niederlenz =

- Municipality
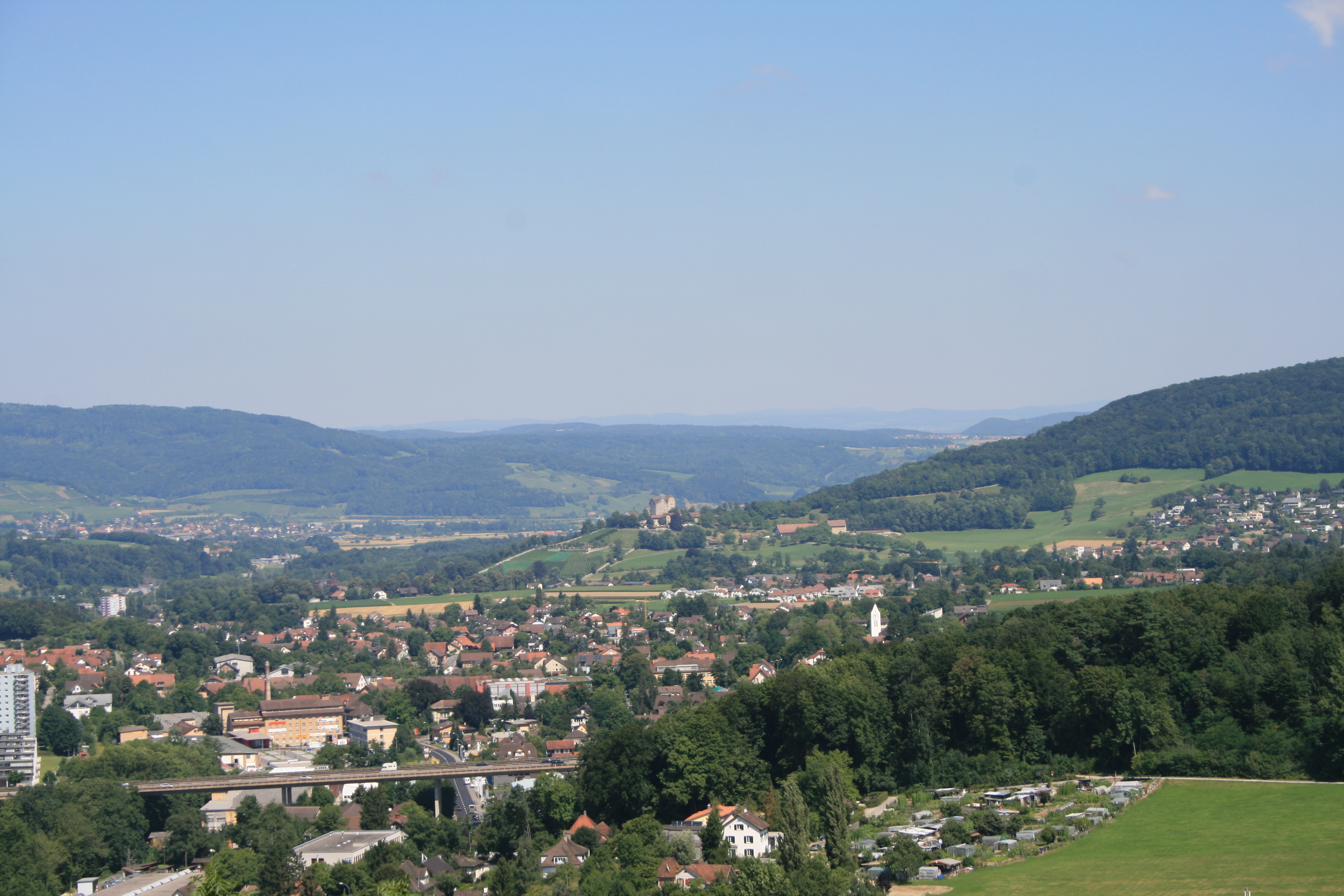

- Flag Coat of arms
- Location of Niederlenz
- Location within Switzerland Location within Canton of Aargau
- Coordinates: 47°24′N 8°11′E
- Country: Switzerland
- Canton: Aargau
- District: Lenzburg

Area
  - Total: 3.26 km^{2} (1.26 sq mi)
- Elevation: 377 m (1,237 ft)

Population (2018-12-31)
  - Total: 4'772 (31. Dezember 2,019)
  - Density: 1.2/km^{2} (3.2/sq mi)
- Time zone: UTC+01:00 (CET)
  - Summer (DST): UTC+02:00 (CEST)
- Postal code: 5702
- SFOS number: 4204
- ISO 3166 code: CH-AG
- Surrounded by: Lenzburg, Möriken-Wildegg, Rupperswil
- Website: www.niederlenz.ch

Niederlenz is a municipality in the district of Lenzburg in the canton of Aargau in Switzerland.

== History ==
Aerial view (1955)

The center of the village comes from a middle Bronze Age settlement and a later Roman era farm. However, the modern village of Niederlenz is first mentioned in 924 as de Lencis. In 1261-64 it was mentioned as Nider-Lenz. The high justice rights were held by Schloss Lenzburg until 1433 when those rights, along with the rights to low justice, were purchased by Bern. Later, the low justice rights reverted to the four villages of Niederlenz, Hunzenschwil, Rupperswil and Staufen. In 1480 village was incorporated with a local government. The village mill was built before 1461 and was pawned by Hans Heinrich of Rinach and then sold in 1486 to Hans von Hallwyl. It was in the possession of the Kull family for generations.

It was originally part of the Staufberg parish. The village got its own church in 1949 and in 1990 became its own parish.

== Geography ==
Niederlenz has an area, as of 2009, of 3.3 square kilometers (1.3 sq mi). Of this area, 0.97 km^{2} (0.37 sq mi) or 29.4% is used for agricultural purposes, while 0.85 km^{2} (0.33 sq mi) or 25.8% is forested. Of the rest of the land, 1.43 km^{2} (0.55 sq mi) or 43.3% is settled (buildings or roads), 0.02 km^{2} (4.9 acres) or 0.6% is either rivers or lakes and 0.01 km^{2} (2.5 acres) or 0.3% is unproductive land.

Of the built up area, industrial buildings made up 5.5% of the total area while housing and buildings made up 22.7% and transportation infrastructure made up 9.4%. Power and water infrastructure as well as other special developed areas made up 3.0% of the area while parks, green belts and sports fields made up 2.7%. Out of the forested land, all of the forested land area is covered with heavy forests. Of the agricultural land, 23.9% is used for growing crops and 4.8% is pastures. All the water in the municipality is in rivers and streams.

The municipality is located in the Lenzburg district, along the Aabach stream and on the neighboring terrace. It consists of the linear village of Niederlenz.

== Coat of arms ==
The blazon of the municipal coat of arms is Or a Linden Leaf Vert and Coupeaux of the same.

== Demographics ==
Niederlenz has a population (as of December 2020) of 4,841. As of June 2009, 26.9% of the population are foreign nationals. Over the last 10 years (1997–2007) the population has changed at a rate of 6.9%. Most of the population (as of 2000) speaks German (82.8%), with Italian being second most common ( 4.8%) and Serbo-Croatian being third ( 3.5%).

The age distribution, as of 2008, in Niederlenz is; 445 children or 11.0% of the population are between 0 and 9 years old and 529 teenagers or 13.1% are between 10 and 19. Of the adult population, 554 people or 13.7% of the population are between 20 and 29 years old. 531 people or 13.1% are between 30 and 39, 664 people or 16.4% are between 40 and 49, and 555 people or 13.7% are between 50 and 59. The senior population distribution is 380 people or 9.4% of the population are between 60 and 69 years old, 258 people or 6.4% are between 70 and 79, there are 102 people or 2.5% who are between 80 and 89, and there are 21 people or 0.5% who are 90 and older.

As of 2000 the average number of residents per living room was 0.57 which is about equal to the cantonal average of 0.57 per room. In this case, a room is defined as space of a housing unit of at least 4 m^{2} (43 sq ft) as normal bedrooms, dining rooms, living rooms, kitchens and habitable cellars and attics. About 49.5% of the total households were owner occupied, or in other words did not pay rent (though they may have a mortgage or a rent-to-own agreement).

As of 2000, there were 126 homes with 1 or 2 persons in the household, 889 homes with 3 or 4 persons in the household, and 523 homes with 5 or more persons in the household. As of 2000, there were 1,621 private households (homes and apartments) in the municipality, and an average of 2.3 persons per household. In 2008 there were 740 single family homes (or 42.4% of the total) out of a total of 1,746 homes and apartments. There were a total of 21 empty apartments for a 1.2% vacancy rate. As of 2007, the construction rate of new housing units was 0.7 new units per 1000 residents.

In the 2007 federal election the most popular party was the SVP which received 39.2% of the vote. The next three most popular parties were the SP (20.4%), the FDP (12.1%) and the CVP (8.4%).

The historical population is given in the following table:

Historical population
Year	Pop.	±%
1764	293	—
1850	779	+165.9%
1900	995	+27.7%
1950	1,987	+99.7%
2000	3,846	+93.6%

== Heritage sites of national significance ==
The former tithe barn of Schloss Lenzburg at Dorfrain 9 is listed as a Swiss heritage site of national significance.

== Economy ==
As of 2007, Niederlenz had an unemployment rate of 2.68%. As of 2005, there were 28 people employed in the primary economic sector and about 11 businesses involved in this sector. 423 people are employed in the secondary sector and there are 35 businesses in this sector. 591 people are employed in the tertiary sector, with 109 businesses in this sector.

In 2000 there were 2,009 workers who lived in the municipality. Of these, 1,626 or about 80.9% of the residents worked outside Niederlenz while 730 people commuted into the municipality for work. There were a total of 1,113 jobs (of at least 6 hours per week) in the municipality. Of the working population, 17.8% used public transportation to get to work, and 53.9% used a private car.

== Religion ==
From the 2000 census, 1,201 or 31.2% were Roman Catholic, while 1,801 or 46.8% belonged to the Swiss Reformed Church. Of the rest of the population, there were 2 individuals (or about 0.05% of the population) who belonged to the Christian Catholic faith.

== Education ==
In Niederlenz about 70.7% of the population (between age 25-64) have completed either non-mandatory upper secondary education or additional higher education (either university or a Fachhochschule). Of the school age population (in the 2008/2009 school year), there are 300 students attending primary school, there are 129 students attending secondary school in the municipality. Niederlenz is home to the Schul-Gemeinde Bibliothek Niederlenz (School and Municipal library). The library has (as of 2008) 11,566 books or other media, and loaned out 31,693 items in the same year. It was open a total of 208 days with average of 11 hours per week during that year.
