= Staufen, Aargau =

Staufen
- Municipality
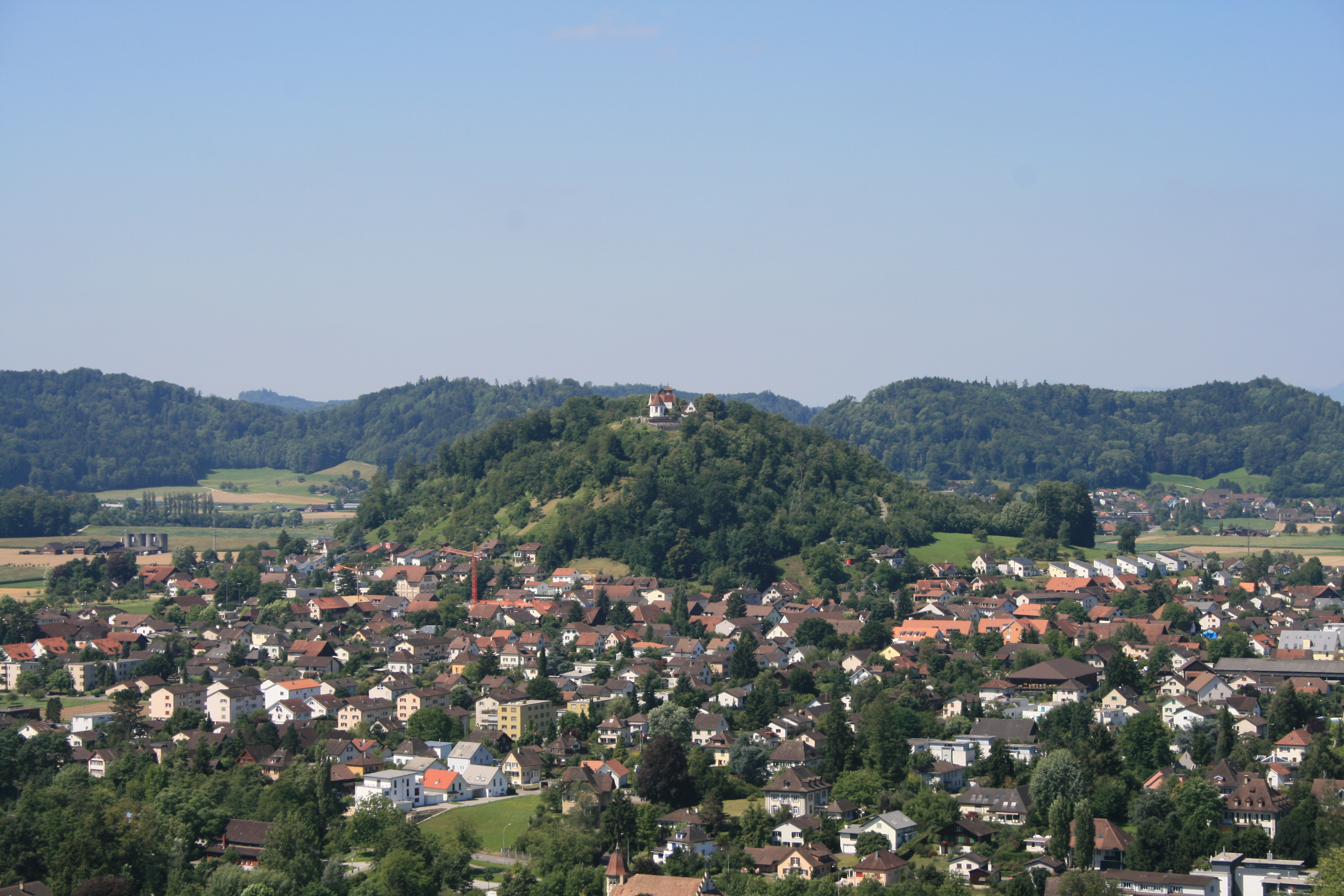

- Flag Coat of arms
- Location of Staufen
- Location within Switzerland Location within Canton of Aargau
- Coordinates: 47°23′N 8°10′E
- Country: Switzerland
- Canton: Aargau
- District: Lenzburg

Area
  - Total: 3.57 km^{2} (1.38 sq mi)
- Elevation: 421 m (1,381 ft)

Population (December 2006)
  - Total: 2,341
  - Density: 656/km^{2} (1,700/sq mi)
- Time zone: UTC+01:00 (CET)
  - Summer (DST): UTC+02:00 (CEST)
- Postal code: 5603
- SFOS number: 4210
- ISO 3166 code: CH-AG
- Surrounded by: Lenzburg, Rupperswil, Schafisheim, Seon
- Website: www.staufen.ch

Staufen is a municipality in the district of Lenzburg in the canton of Aargau in Switzerland.

== Geography ==
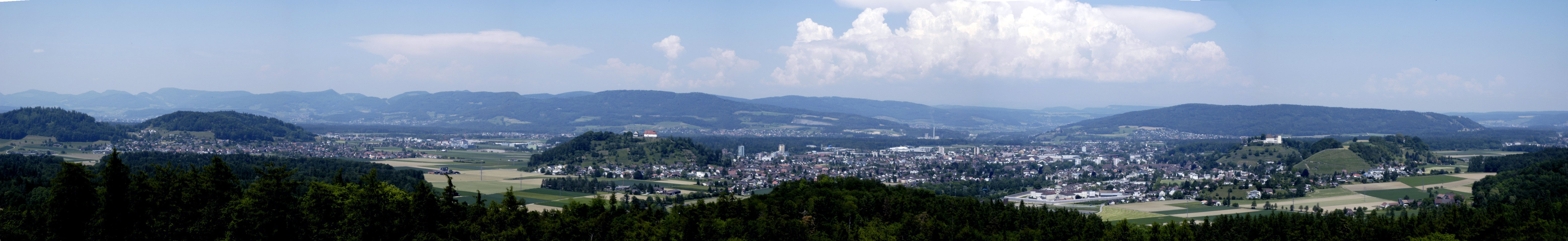
Panorama of the Lenzburg region with Schlossberg and Staufburg, the town of Lenzburg (right) and the villages of Staufen (centre) and Schafisheim (left)

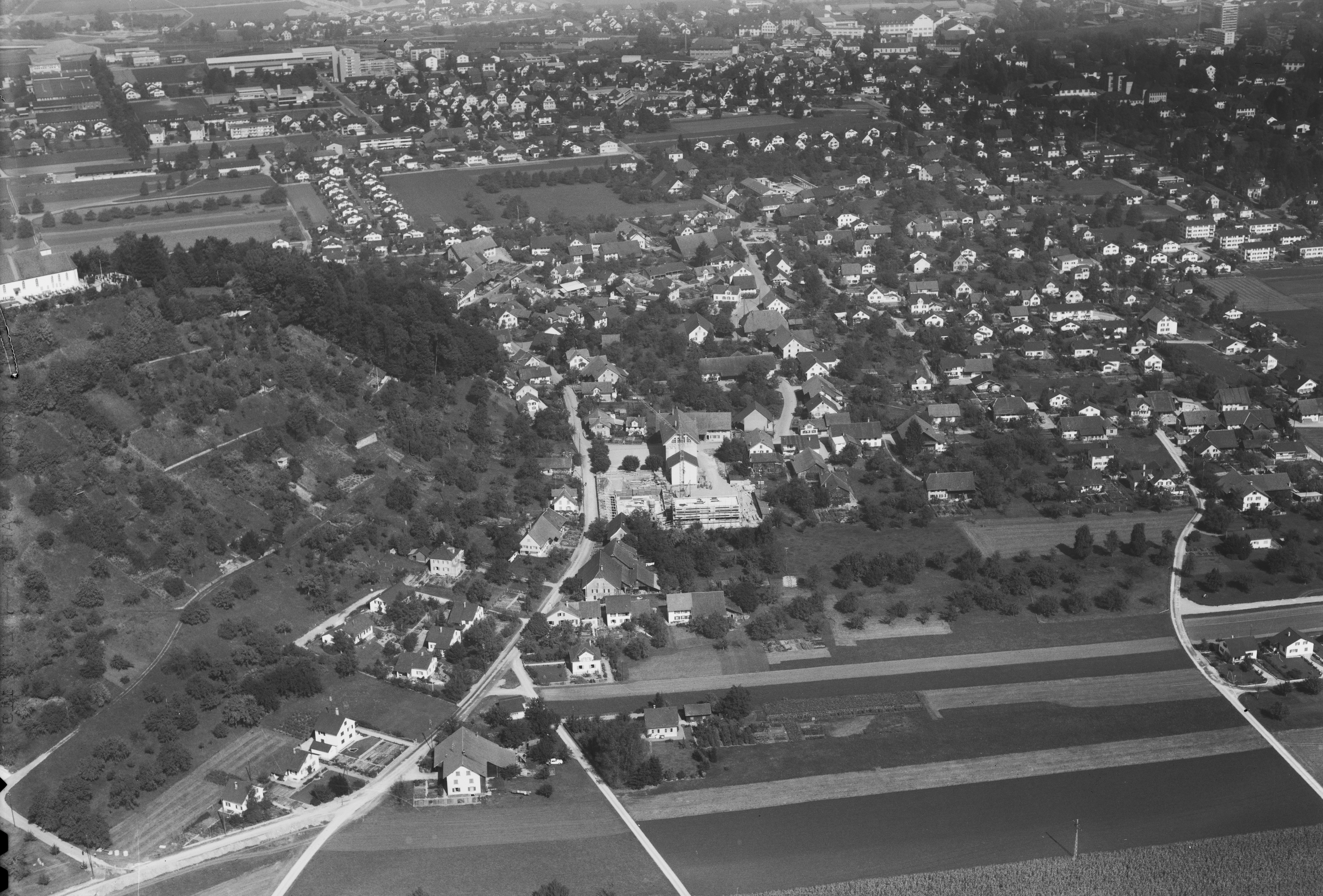
Aerial view (1964)

Staufen has an area, as of 2009, of 3.57 square kilometres (1.38 sq mi). Of this area, 1.43 km^{2} (0.55 sq mi) or 40.1% is used for agricultural purposes, while 1.13 km^{2} (0.44 sq mi) or 31.7% is forested. Of the rest of the land, 0.95 km^{2} (0.37 sq mi) or 26.6% is settled (buildings or roads).

Of the built up area, industrial buildings made up 2.2% of the total area while housing and buildings made up 14.8% and transportation infrastructure made up 4.5%. Power and water infrastructure as well as other special developed areas made up 4.2% of the area. Out of the forested land, all of the forested land area is covered with heavy forests. Of the agricultural land, 32.5% is used for growing crops and 5.6% is pastures, while 2.0% is used for orchards or vine crops.

== Coat of arms ==
The blazon of the municipal coat of arms is Gules three Cups Or.

== Demographics ==
Staufen has a population (as of December 2020) of 4,068. As of June 2009, 14.7% of the population are foreign nationals. Over the last 10 years (1997–2007), the population has changed at a rate of 12.7%. Most of the population (as of 2000) speaks German (89.4%), with Italian being second most common (4.9%) and Portuguese being third (1.2%).

The age distribution, as of 2008, in Staufen is: 268 children or 10.4% of the population are between 0 and 9 years old and 261 teenagers or 10.1% are between 10 and 19. Of the adult population, 309 people or 11.9% of the population are between 20 and 29 years old. 324 people or 12.5% are between 30 and 39, 443 people or 17.1% are between 40 and 49, and 367 people or 14.2% are between 50 and 59. The senior population distribution is 286 people or 11.1% of the population are between 60 and 69 years old, 205 people or 7.9% are between 70 and 79, there are 106 people or 4.1% who are between 80 and 89, and there are 17 people or 0.7% who are 90 and older.

As of 2000, there were 71 homes with 1 or 2 persons in the household, 423 homes with 3 or 4 persons in the household, and 402 homes with 5 or more persons in the household. As of 2000, there were 932 private households (homes and apartments) in the municipality, and an average of 2.3 persons per household. In 2008 there were 526 single-family homes (or 45.5% of the total) out of a total of 1,155 homes and apartments. There were a total of 12 empty apartments for a 1.0% vacancy rate. As of 2007, the construction rate of new housing units was 8.6 new units per 1000 residents.

In the 2007 federal election the most popular party was the SVP, which received 34.8% of the vote. The next three most popular parties were the SP (17.6%), the FDP (14.1%) and the CVP (10.7%).

The historical population is given in the following table:

Historical population
Year	Pop.	±%
1975	1,963	—
1980	2,095	+6.7%
1990	2,196	+4.8%
2000	2,188	−0.4%

== Heritage sites of national significance ==
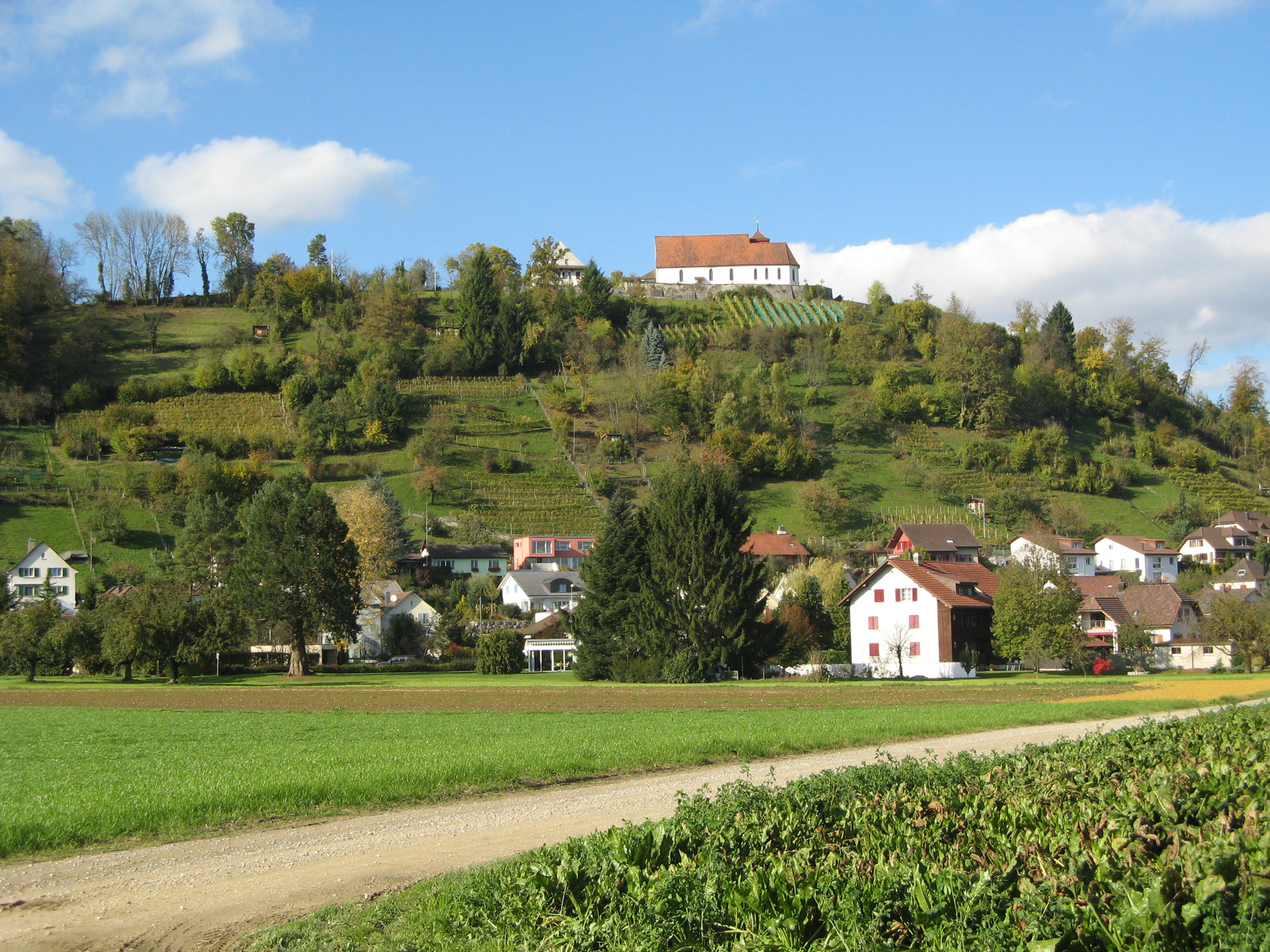
Staufen church complex

The Protestant church, rectory, sexton's barn and adjoining buildings are listed as a Swiss heritage site of national significance.

== Economy ==
As of 2007, Staufen had an unemployment rate of 1.85%. As of 2005, there were 34 people employed in the primary economic sector and about 12 businesses involved in this sector. 143 people are employed in the secondary sector and there are 19 businesses in this sector. 167 people are employed in the tertiary sector, with 34 businesses in this sector.

In 2000 there were 1,163 workers who lived in the municipality. Of these, 980 or about 84.3% of the residents worked outside Staufen while 276 people commuted into the municipality for work. There were a total of 459 jobs (of at least 6 hours per week) in the municipality. Of the working population, 18.1% used public transportation to get to work, and 43.5% used a private car.

== Religion ==
From the 2000 census, 602 or 27.2% were Roman Catholic, while 1,214 or 54.9% belonged to the Swiss Reformed Church. Of the rest of the population, there was 1 individual who belonged to the Christian Catholic faith.

== Education ==
In Staufen about 71% of the population (between age 25-64) have completed either non-mandatory upper secondary education or additional higher education (either university or a Fachhochschule). Of the school age population (in the 2008/2009 school year), there are 173 students attending primary school, there are 69 students attending secondary school in the municipality.
