= Luzern Littau railway station =

Railway station in Lucerne, Switzerland

Luzern Littau
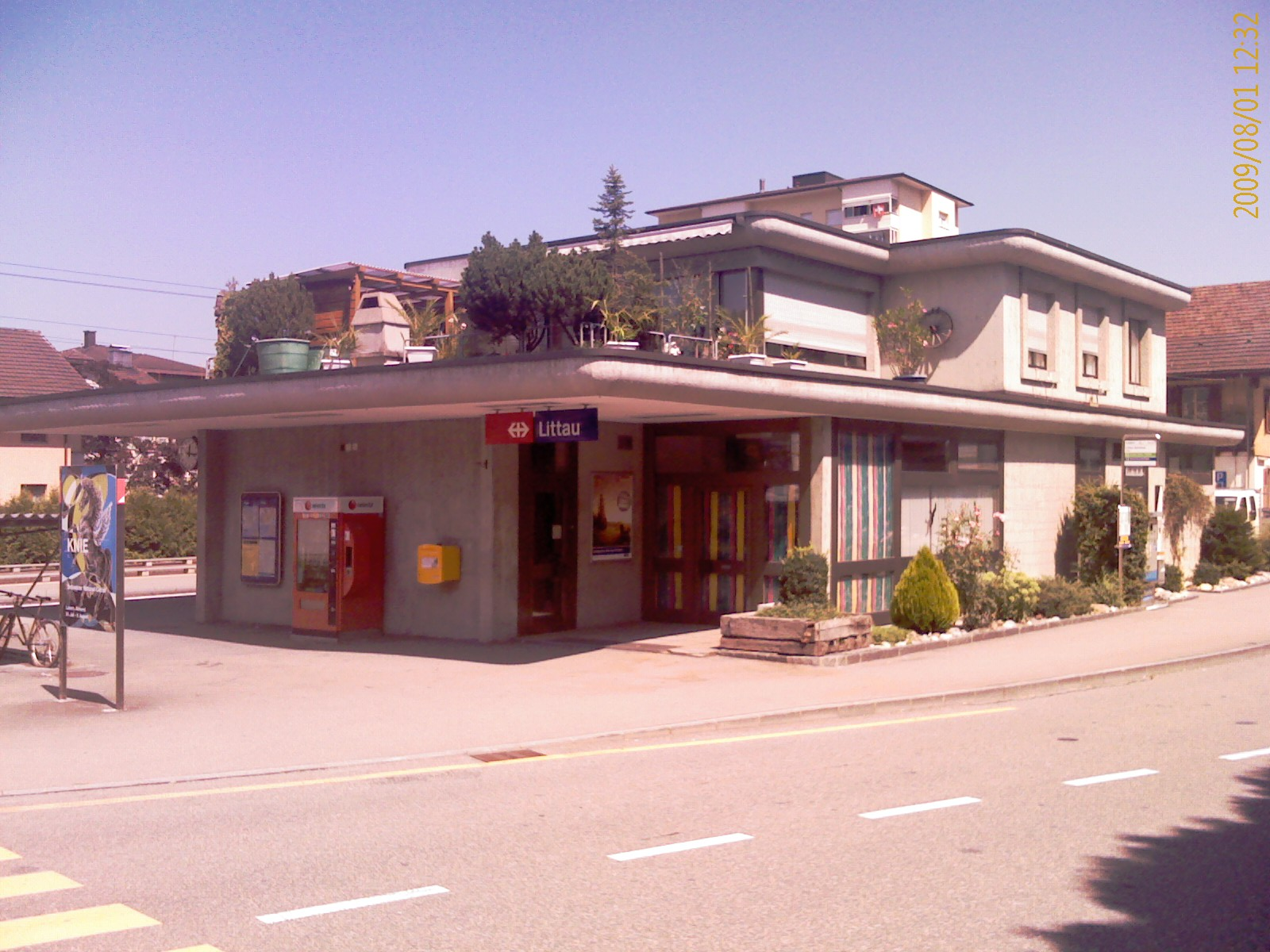
- The station building in 2009

General information
- Location: Lucerne; Switzerland
- Coordinates: 47°03′11″N 8°15′26″E
- Elevation: 456 m (1,496 ft)
- Owner: Swiss Federal Railways
- Line: Bern–Lucerne line
- Platforms: 2 (2 island platforms)
- Tracks: 3
- Train operators: BLS AG
- Connections: Verkehrsbetriebe Luzern AG bus line; Auto AG Rothenburg bus lines

Construction
- Parking: Yes (8 spaces)
- Cycle facilities: Yes (12 spaces)
- Accessible: No

Other information
- Station code: 8508219 (LIT)
- Fare zone: 10 (Passepartout)

History
- Former names: Littau

Passengers
- 2023: 1'100 per weekday (BLS)

Services
Preceding station	Lucerne S-Bahn	Following station
Malters towards Langenthal or Langnau i.E.	S6	Lucerne Terminus
Malters towards Willisau	S77	Lucerne Terminus
Location

Luzern Littau railway station (German: Bahnhof Luzern Littau) is a railway station in the locality of Littau, within the municipality of Lucerne, in the Swiss canton of Lucerne. It is an intermediate stop on the standard gauge Bern–Lucerne line of Swiss Federal Railways. Until the December 2023 timetable change, the station was named Littau.

== History ==
Between January 2024 and January 2026 the station's infrastructure will be upgraded. Two new side platforms will be built at a height of 55 centimetres (22 in) and at a length of 220 metres (720 ft) to permit barrier-free boarding. A ticket machine, station lighting and loud speakers will be installed on the new platforms. The tracks, safety system and electrical equipment will be also upgraded.

== Services ==
As of the December 2024 timetable change, the following services stop at Luzern Littau:

- Lucerne S-Bahn:
  - S6: hourly service between Lucerne and Langnau i.E. or Langenthal; the train splits at Wolhusen.
  - S77: rush-hour service between Willisau and Lucerne.

== Gallery ==
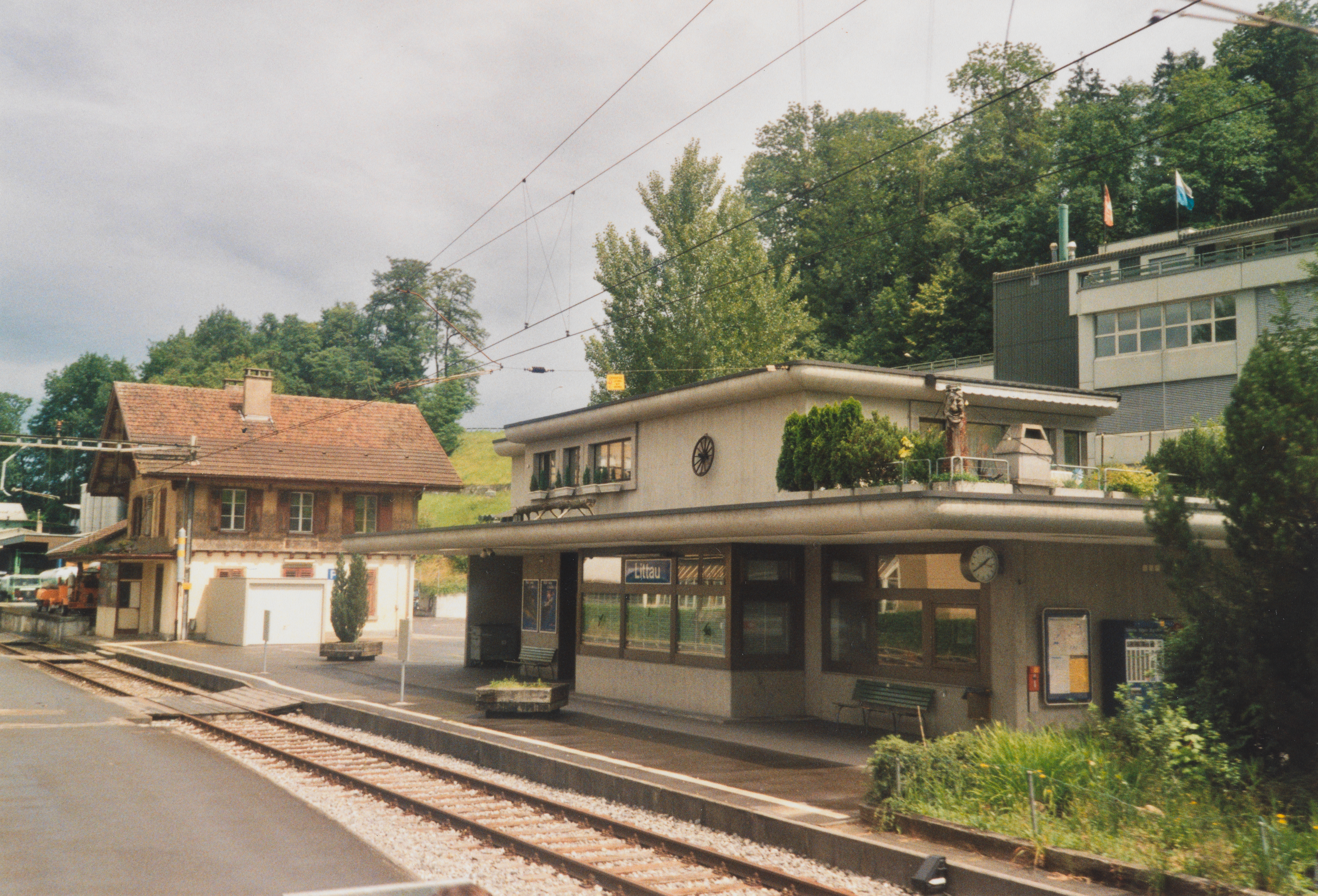
old and new station buildings in 2000

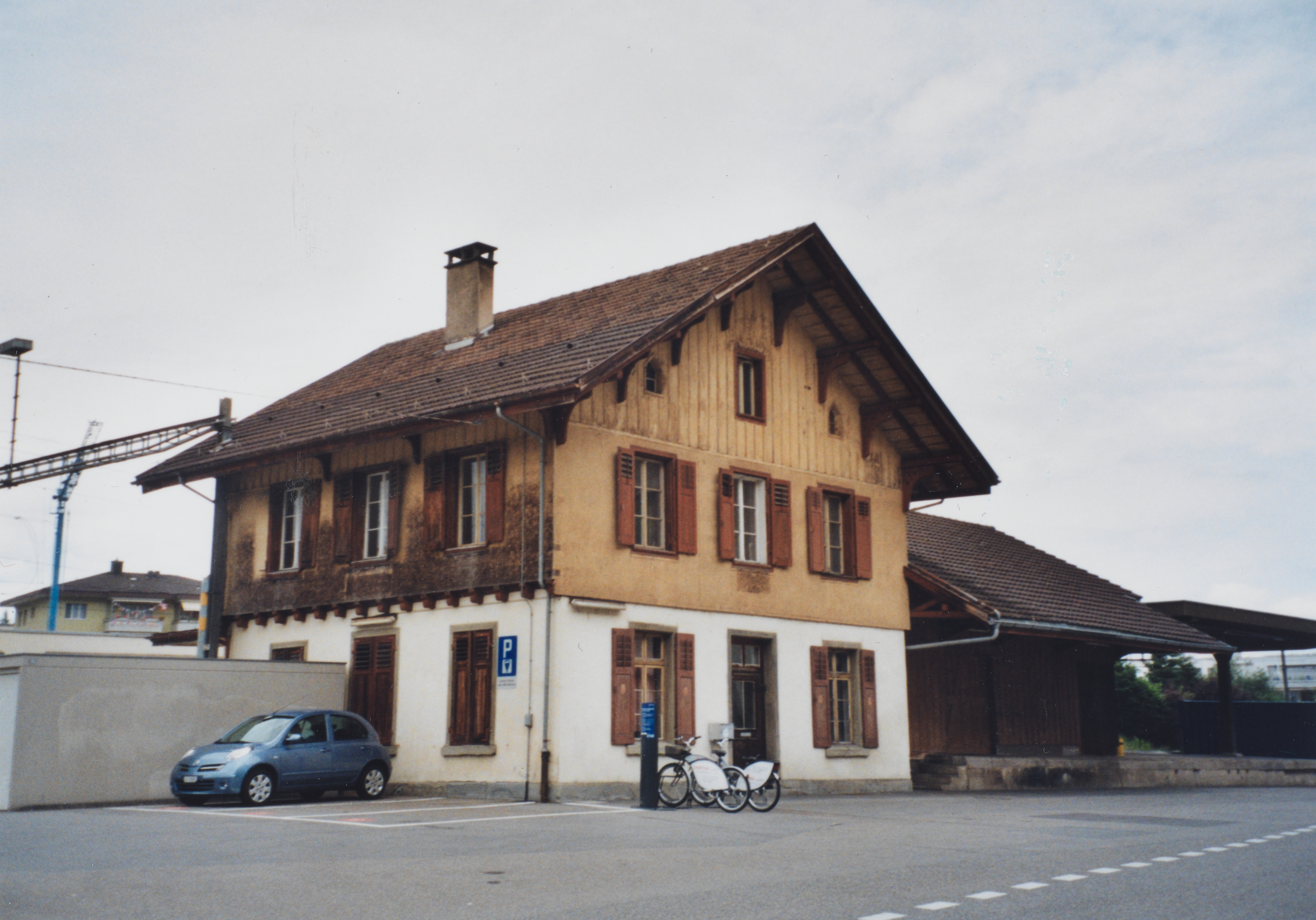
old station building, Cheerstrasse-side
