= Wolhusen Weid railway station =

Railway station in Wolhusen, Switzerland

Wolhusen Weid

General information
- Location: Wolhusen; Switzerland
- Coordinates: 47°03′54″N 8°04′16″E
- Elevation: 601 m (1,972 ft)
- Owner: BLS AG
- Line: Huttwil–Wolhusen line
- Distance: 23.6 km (14.7 mi) from Huttwil
- Platforms: 1 side platform
- Tracks: 1
- Train operators: BLS AG
- Connections: Automobil Rottal AG bus line

Construction
- Accessible: Yes

Other information
- Station code: 8516354 (WHW)
- Fare zone: 33 (Passepartout)

Passengers
- 2023: 240 per weekday (BLS)

Services
Preceding station	Lucerne S-Bahn	Following station
Menznau towards Langenthal	S6	Wolhusen towards Lucerne
Menznau towards Langenthal	S7	Wolhusen towards Lucerne
Location

Wolhusen Weid railway station (German: Bahnhof Wolhusen Weid) is a railway station in the municipality of Wolhusen, in the Swiss canton of Lucerne. It is an intermediate stop on the standard gauge Huttwil–Wolhusen line of BLS AG.

== Services ==
As of the December 2024 timetable change, the following services stop at Wolhusen Weid:

- Lucerne S-Bahn: S6/S7: half-hourly service between Lucerne and Langenthal; on Sundays, S7 trains only run until Willisau. S7 trains operate combined with a RegioExpress between Wolhusen and Lucerne.
