= Malters railway station =

Railway station in Malters, Switzerland

Malters
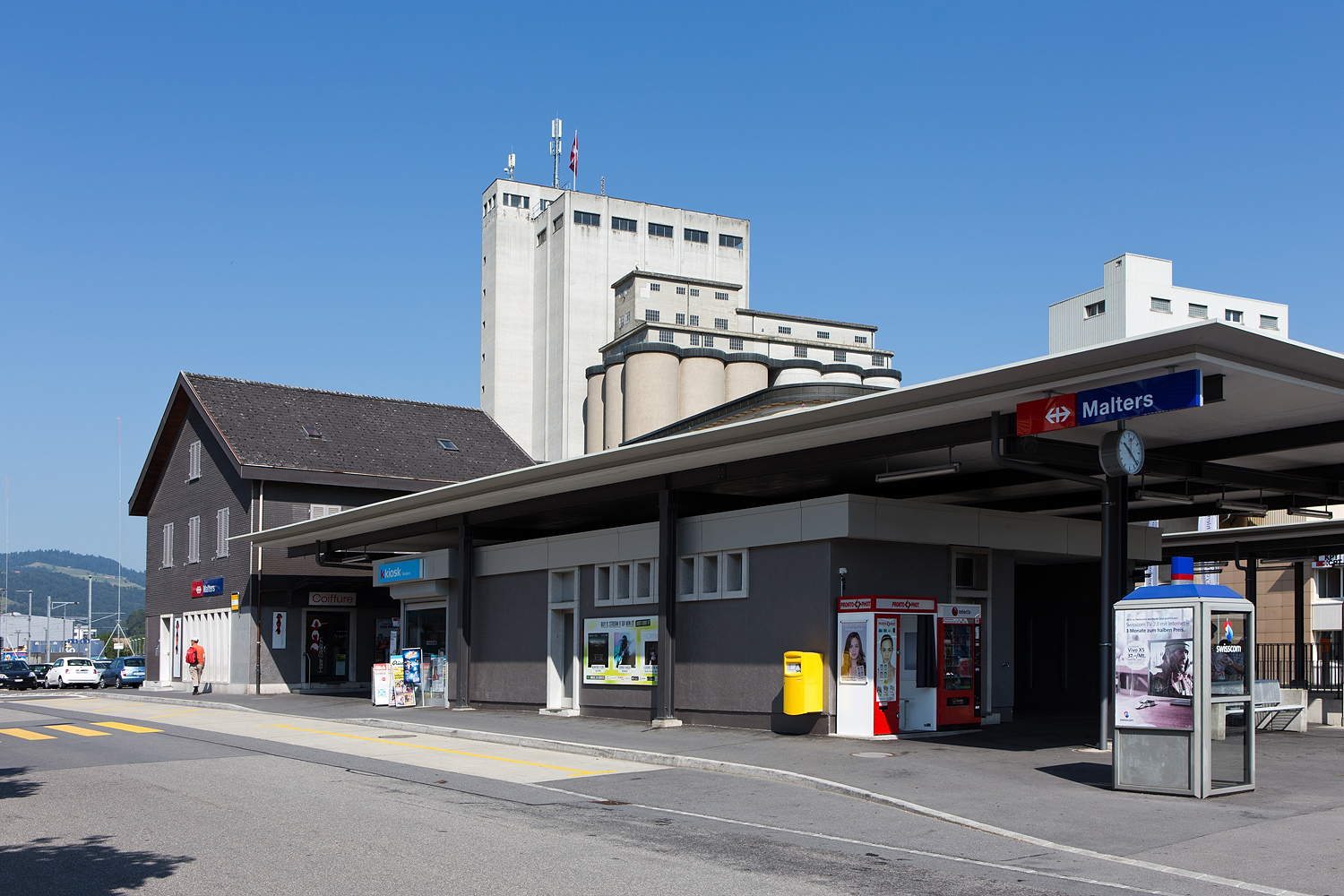
- The station building in 2015

General information
- Location: Malters; Switzerland
- Coordinates: 47°02′19″N 8°10′55″E
- Elevation: 496 m (1,627 ft)
- Owner: Swiss Federal Railways
- Line: Bern–Lucerne line
- Platforms: 2 (1 island platform)
- Tracks: 3
- Train operators: BLS AG
- Connections: PostAuto AG bus line; Automobil Rottal AG bus line

Construction
- Parking: Yes (42 spaces)
- Cycle facilities: Yes (189 spaces)
- Accessible: Yes

Other information
- Station code: 8508218 (MAL)
- Fare zone: 23 (Passepartout)

Passengers
- 2023: 2'900 per weekday (BLS)

Services
Preceding station	Lucerne S-Bahn	Following station
Schachen LU towards Langenthal or Langnau i.E.	S6	Luzern Littau towards Lucerne
Wolhusen towards Willisau	S77	Luzern Littau towards Lucerne
Preceding station	BLS	Following station
Wolhusen towards Bern, Willisau or Langenthal	RE7	Lucerne Terminus
Location

Malters railway station (German: Bahnhof Malters) is a railway station in the municipality of Malters, in the Swiss canton of Lucerne. It is an intermediate stop on the standard gauge Bern–Lucerne line of Swiss Federal Railways.

== Services ==
As of the December 2024 timetable change, the following services stop at Malters:

- RegioExpress: hourly service between Bern and Lucerne or Langenthal, the train splits at Wolhusen.
- Lucerne S-Bahn:
  - S6: hourly service between Lucerne and Langnau i.E. or Langenthal; the train splits at Wolhusen.
  - S77: rush-hour service between Willisau and Lucerne.

== Gallery ==
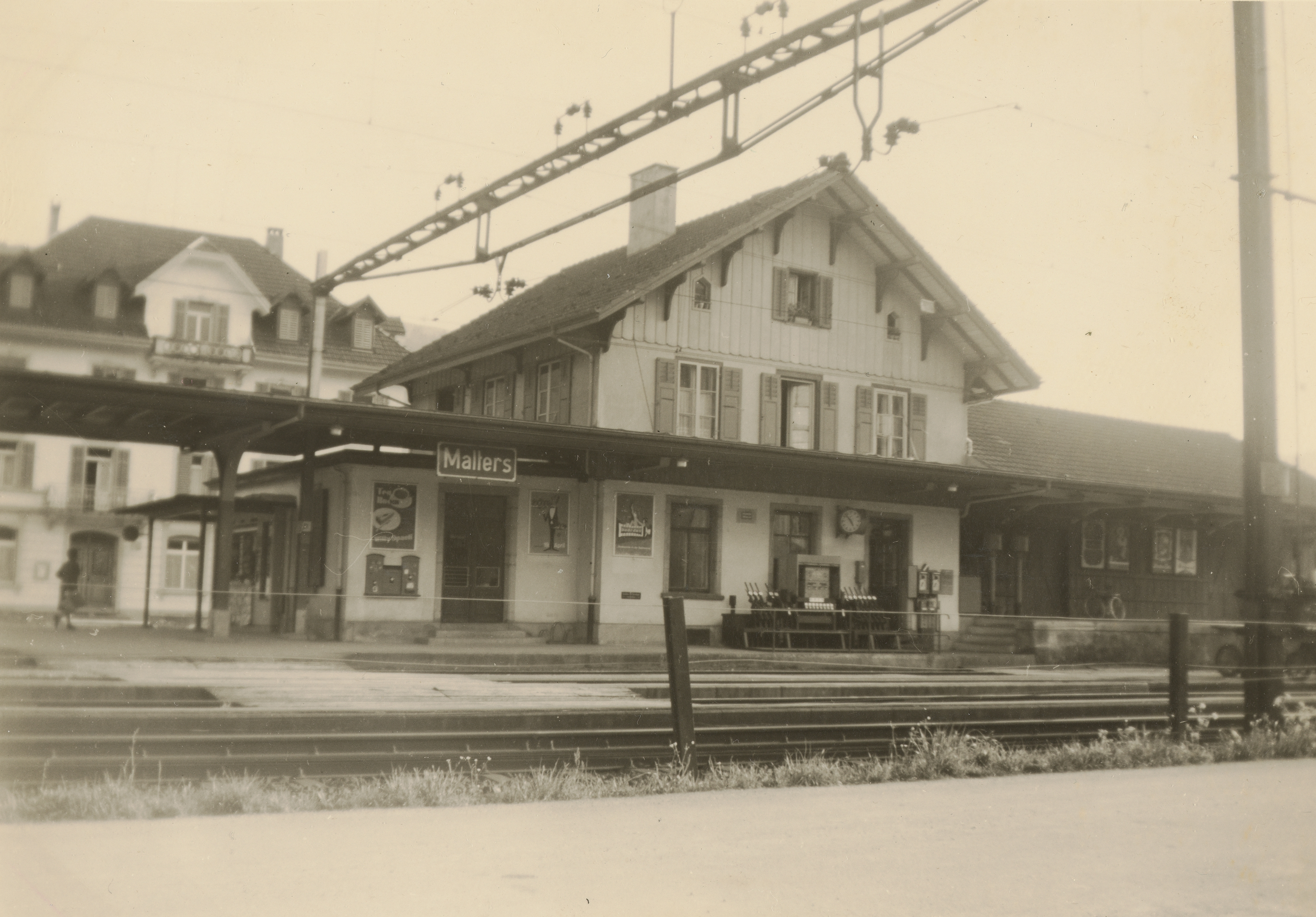
station building, undated view

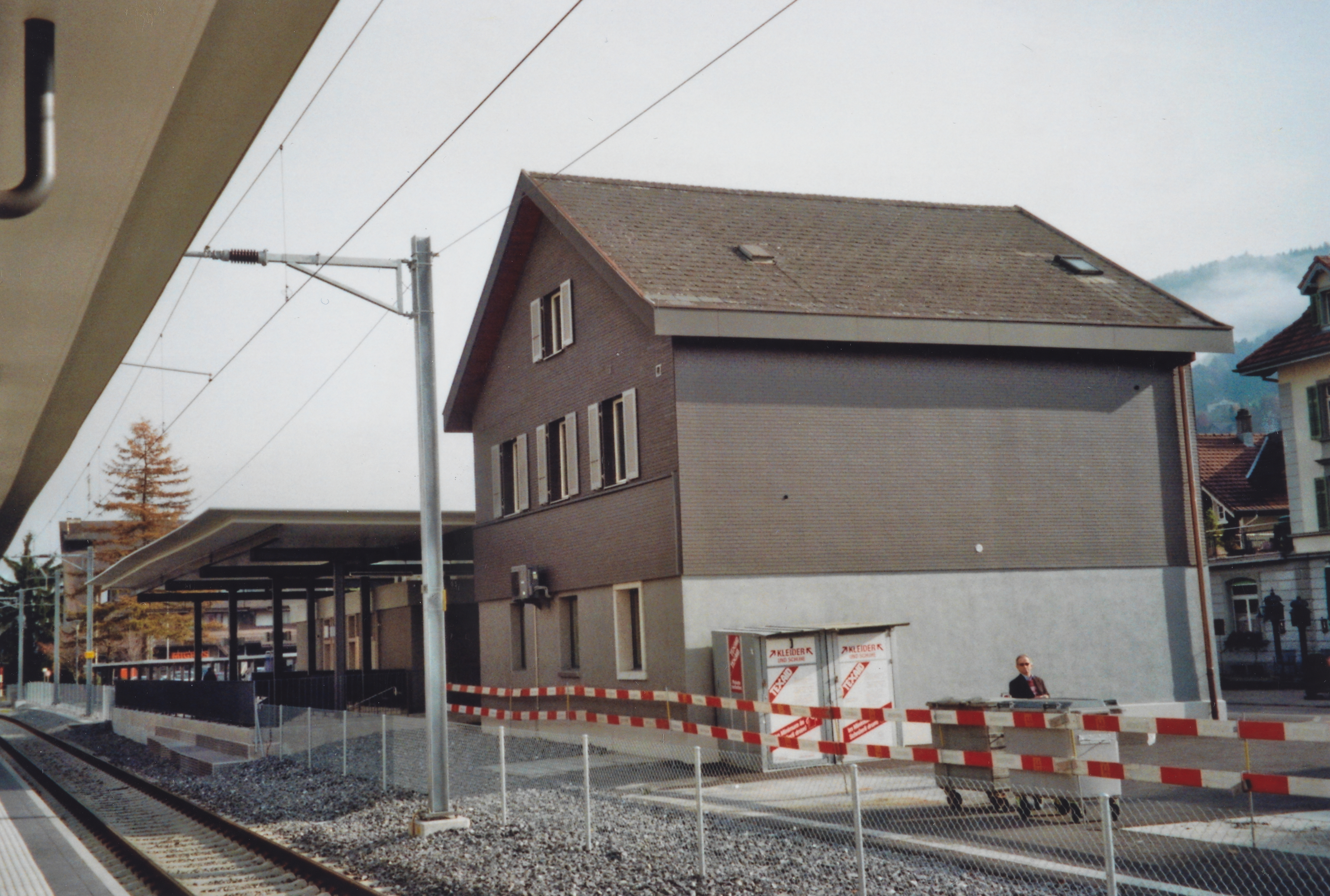
station building, trains side (2012)
