= Menznau railway station =

Railway station in Menznau, Switzerland

Menznau
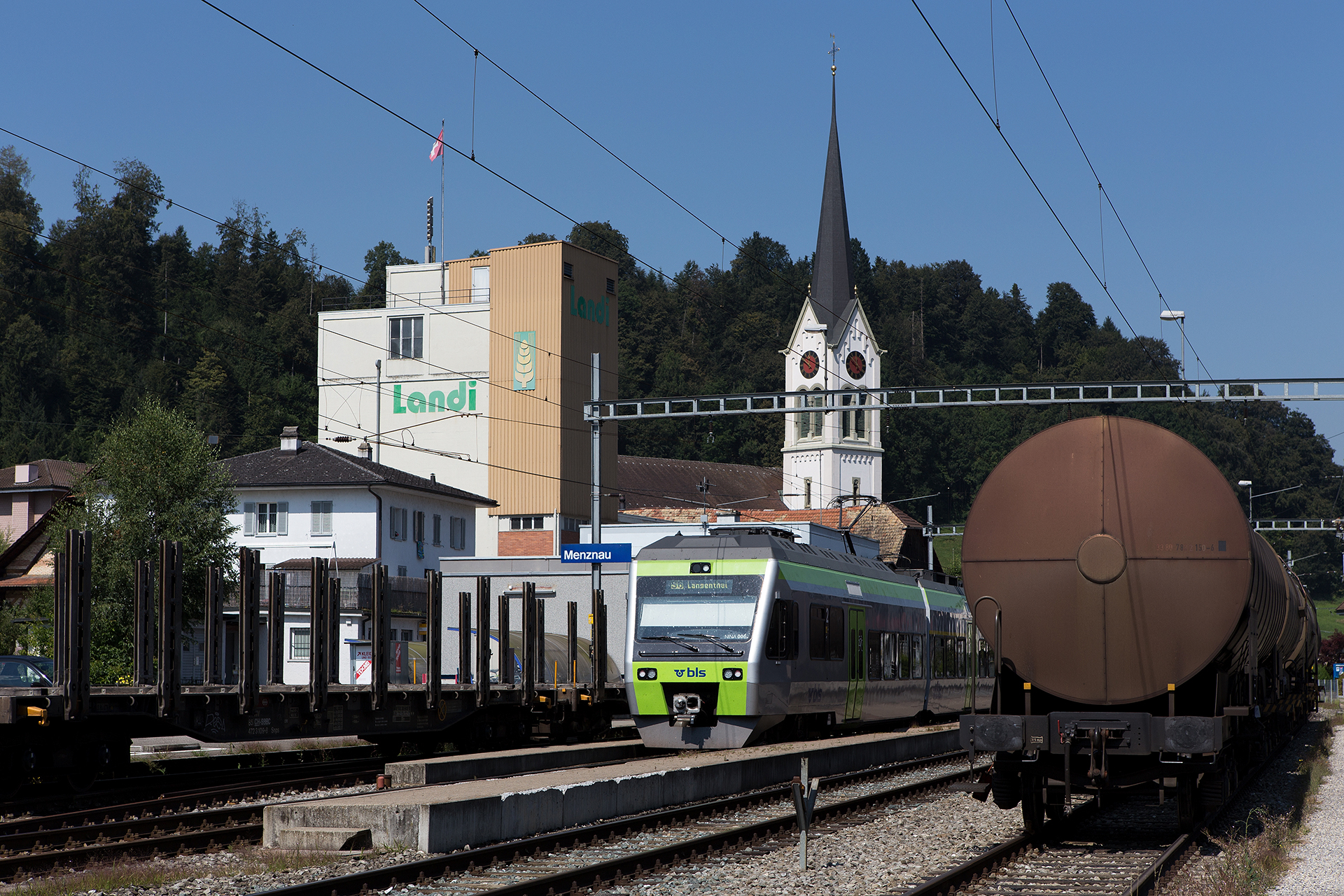
- BLS train at the station in 2016

General information
- Location: Menznau; Switzerland
- Coordinates: 47°04′59″N 8°02′28″E
- Elevation: 596 m (1,955 ft)
- Owner: BLS AG
- Line: Huttwil–Wolhusen line
- Distance: 20.6 km (12.8 mi) from Huttwil
- Platforms: 2 side platforms
- Tracks: 2
- Train operators: BLS AG
- Connections: PostAuto AG buses

Construction
- Parking: Yes (17 spaces)
- Accessible: Yes

Other information
- Station code: 8508297 (MAU)
- Fare zone: 33 (Passepartout)

Passengers
- 2023: 630 per weekday (BLS)

Services
Preceding station	Lucerne S-Bahn	Following station
Willisau towards Langenthal	S6	Wolhusen Weid towards Lucerne
Willisau towards Langenthal	S7	Wolhusen Weid towards Lucerne
Willisau Terminus	S77	Wolhusen towards Lucerne
Location

Menznau railway station (German: Bahnhof Menznau) is a railway station in the municipality of Menznau, in the Swiss canton of Lucerne. It is an intermediate stop on the standard gauge Huttwil–Wolhusen line of BLS AG.

== Services ==
As of the December 2024 timetable change, the following services stop at Menznau:

- Lucerne S-Bahn:
  - S6/S7: half-hourly service between Lucerne and Langenthal; on Sundays, S7 trains only run until Willisau. S7 trains operate combined with a RegioExpress between Wolhusen and Lucerne.
  - S77: rush-hour service between Willisau and Lucerne.

== Gallery ==
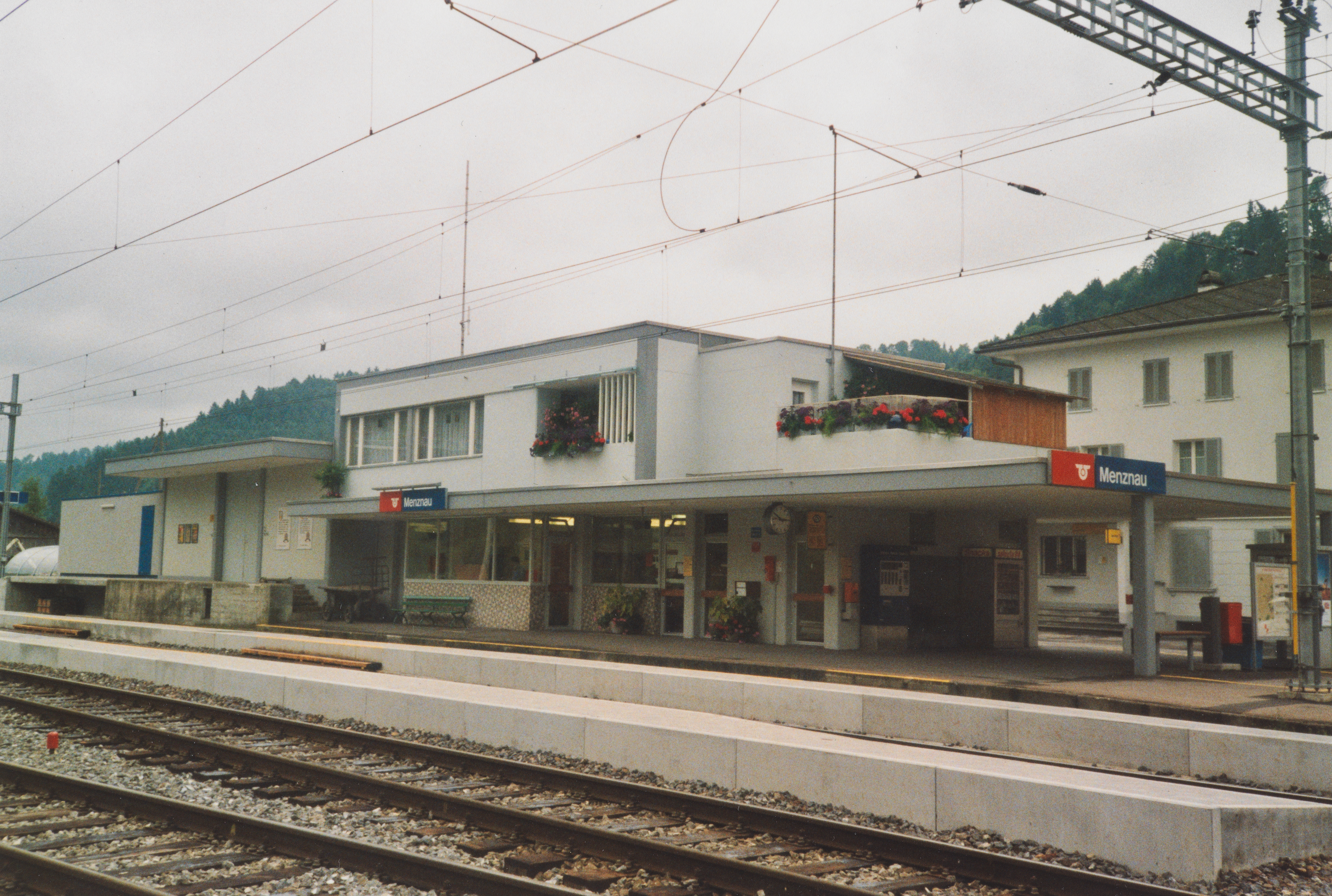
station building, ca. 2000
