= Werthenstein railway station =

Railway station in Ruswil, Switzerland

Werthenstein
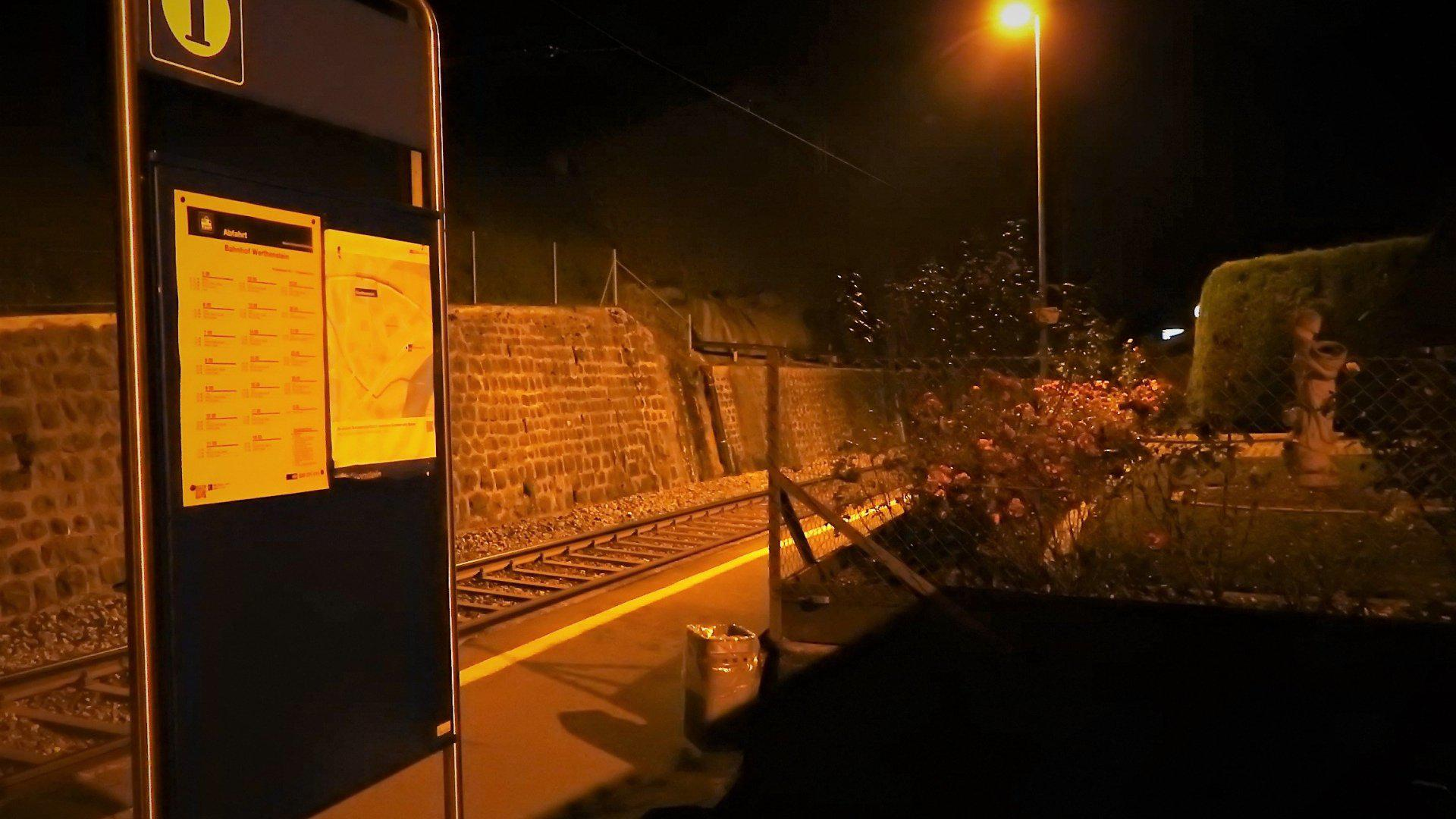
- The station platform in 2018

General information
- Location: Ruswil; Switzerland
- Coordinates: 47°03′25″N 8°06′07″E
- Elevation: 553 m (1,814 ft)
- Owner: Swiss Federal Railways
- Line: Bern–Lucerne line
- Platforms: 1 side platform
- Tracks: 1
- Train operators: BLS AG

Construction
- Cycle facilities: Yes (6 spaces)
- Accessible: No

Other information
- Station code: 8508216 (WST)
- Fare zone: 23 (Passepartout)

Passengers
- 2023: 100 per weekday (BLS)

Services
Preceding station	Lucerne S-Bahn	Following station
Wolhusen towards Langenthal or Langnau i.E.	S6	Schachen LU towards Lucerne
Location

Werthenstein railway station (German: Bahnhof Werthenstein) is a railway station in the municipality of Ruswil, in the Swiss canton of Lucerne. It is an intermediate stop on the standard gauge Bern–Lucerne line of Swiss Federal Railways. The station is named for and serves the municipality of Werthenstein, located across the Kleine Emme.

== Services ==
As of the December 2024 timetable change, the following services stop at Werthenstein:

- Lucerne S-Bahn: S6: hourly service between Lucerne and Langnau i.E. or Langenthal; the train splits at Wolhusen.

== Gallery ==
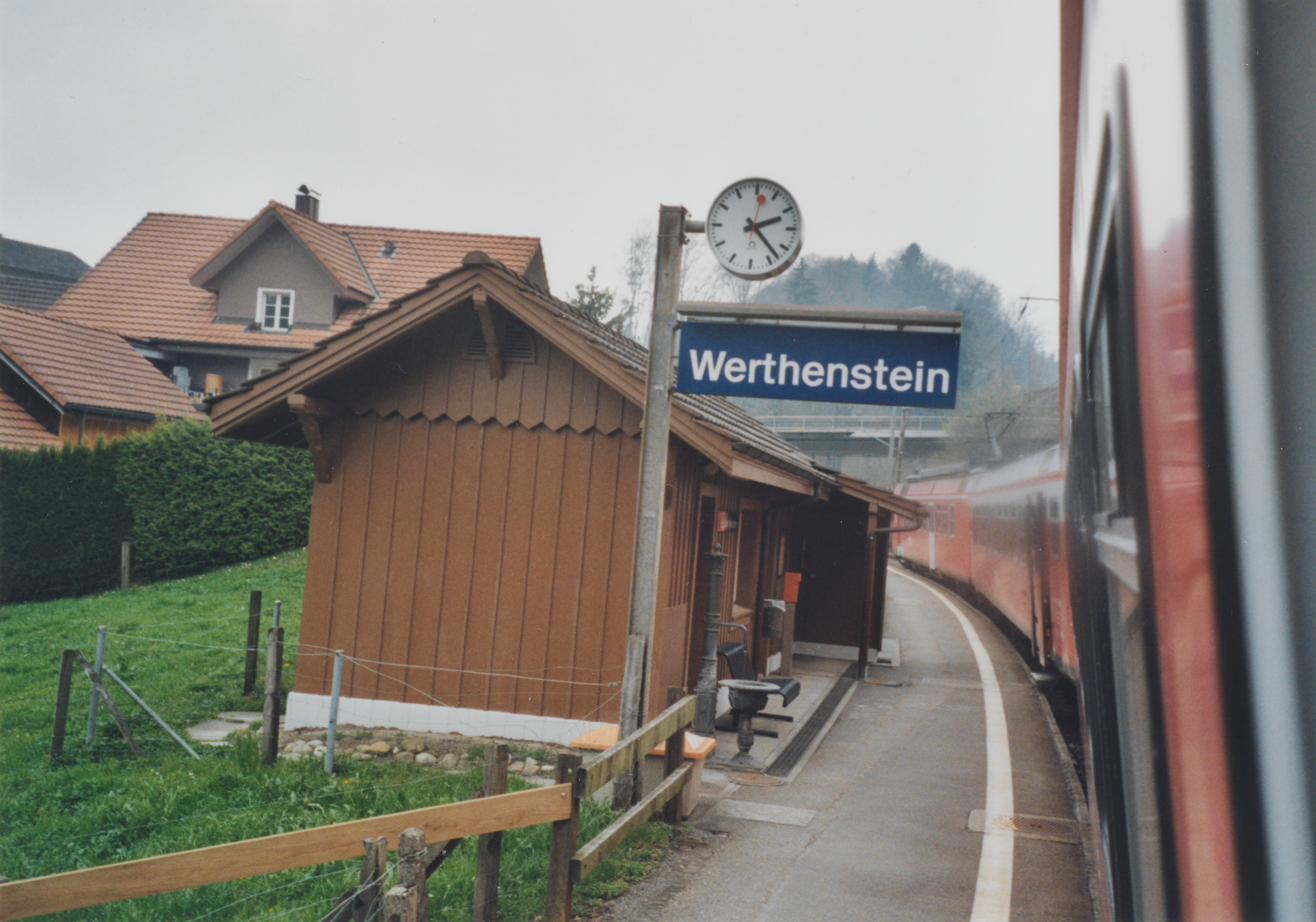
station, 2010
