= Wolhusen railway station =

Railway station in Wolhusen, Switzerland

Wolhusen
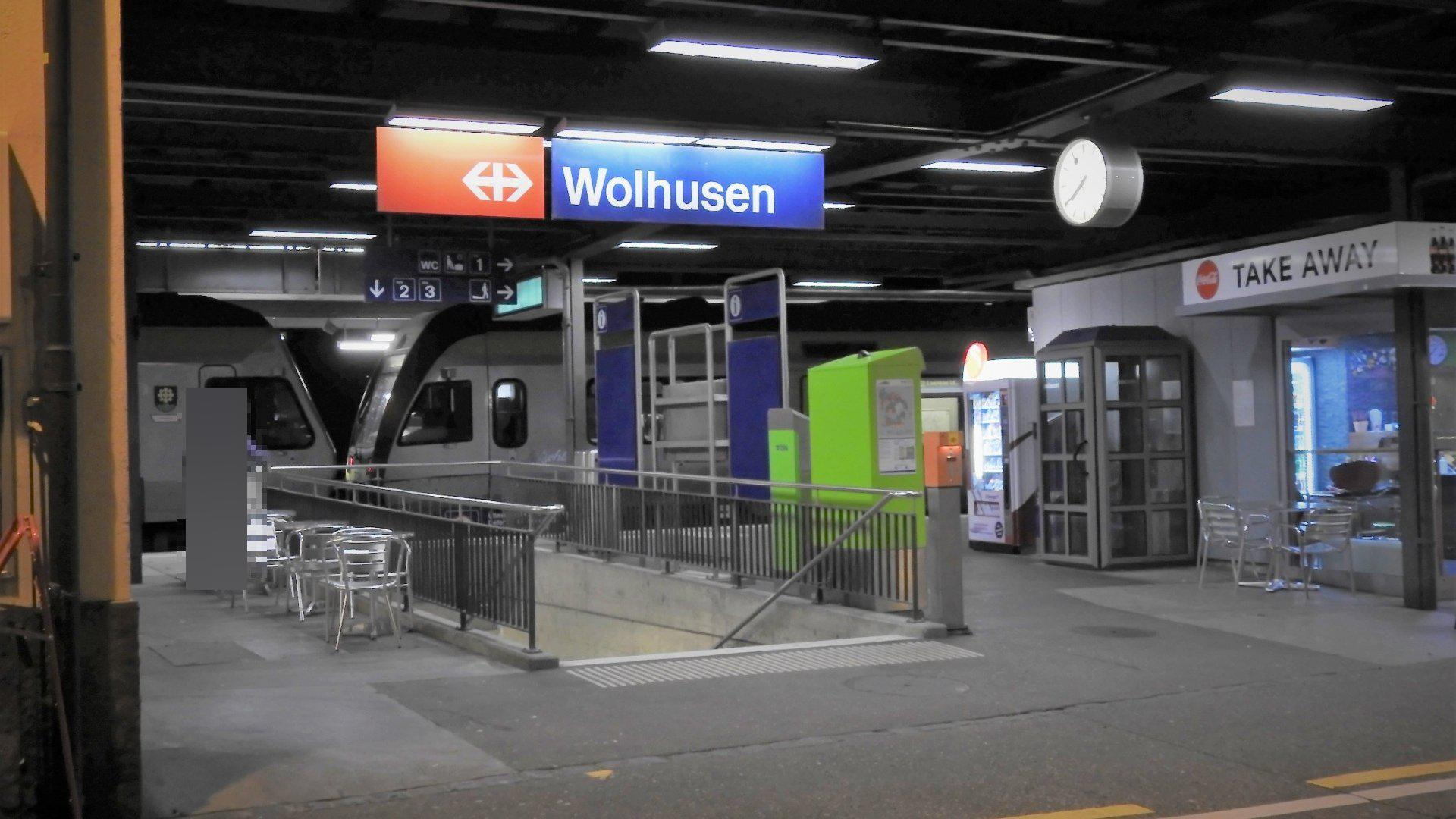
- The station platform in 2018

General information
- Location: Wolhusen; Switzerland
- Coordinates: 47°03′20″N 8°04′47″E
- Elevation: 565 m (1,854 ft)
- Owner: Swiss Federal Railways
- Lines: Bern–Lucerne line; Huttwil–Wolhusen line
- Platforms: 3: 1 side platform; 1 island platform
- Tracks: 6
- Train operators: BLS AG
- Connections: PostAuto AG buses; Automobil Rottal AG buses

Construction
- Cycle facilities: Yes (77 spaces)
- Accessible: Yes

Other information
- Station code: 8508215 (WH)
- Fare zone: 33 (Passepartout)

Passengers
- 2023: 3'400 per weekday (BLS)

Services
Preceding station	Lucerne S-Bahn	Following station
Wolhusen Weid towards Langenthal	S6	Werthenstein towards Lucerne
Entlebuch towards Langnau i.E.	S6	Werthenstein towards Lucerne
Wolhusen Weid towards Langenthal	S7	through to RE7
Menznau towards Willisau	S77	Malters towards Lucerne
Preceding station	BLS	Following station
Entlebuch towards Bern	RE7	Malters towards Lucerne
through to S7	RE7	Malters towards Lucerne
Location

Wolhusen railway station (German: Bahnhof Wolhusen) is a railway station in the municipality of Wolhusen, in the Swiss canton of Lucerne. It is located at the junction of the standard gauge Bern–Lucerne line of Swiss Federal Railways and the Huttwil–Wolhusen line of BLS AG.

== Services ==
As of the December 2024 timetable change, the following services stop at Wolhusen:

- RegioExpress/Lucerne S-Bahn S6: half-hourly service between Langnau i.E. and Lucerne, with every other train continuing from Langnau i.E. to Bern.
- Lucerne S-Bahn:
  - S6/S7: half-hourly service to Langenthal; on Sundays, S7 trains only run until Willisau.
  - S77: rush-hour service between Willisau and Lucerne.

== Gallery ==
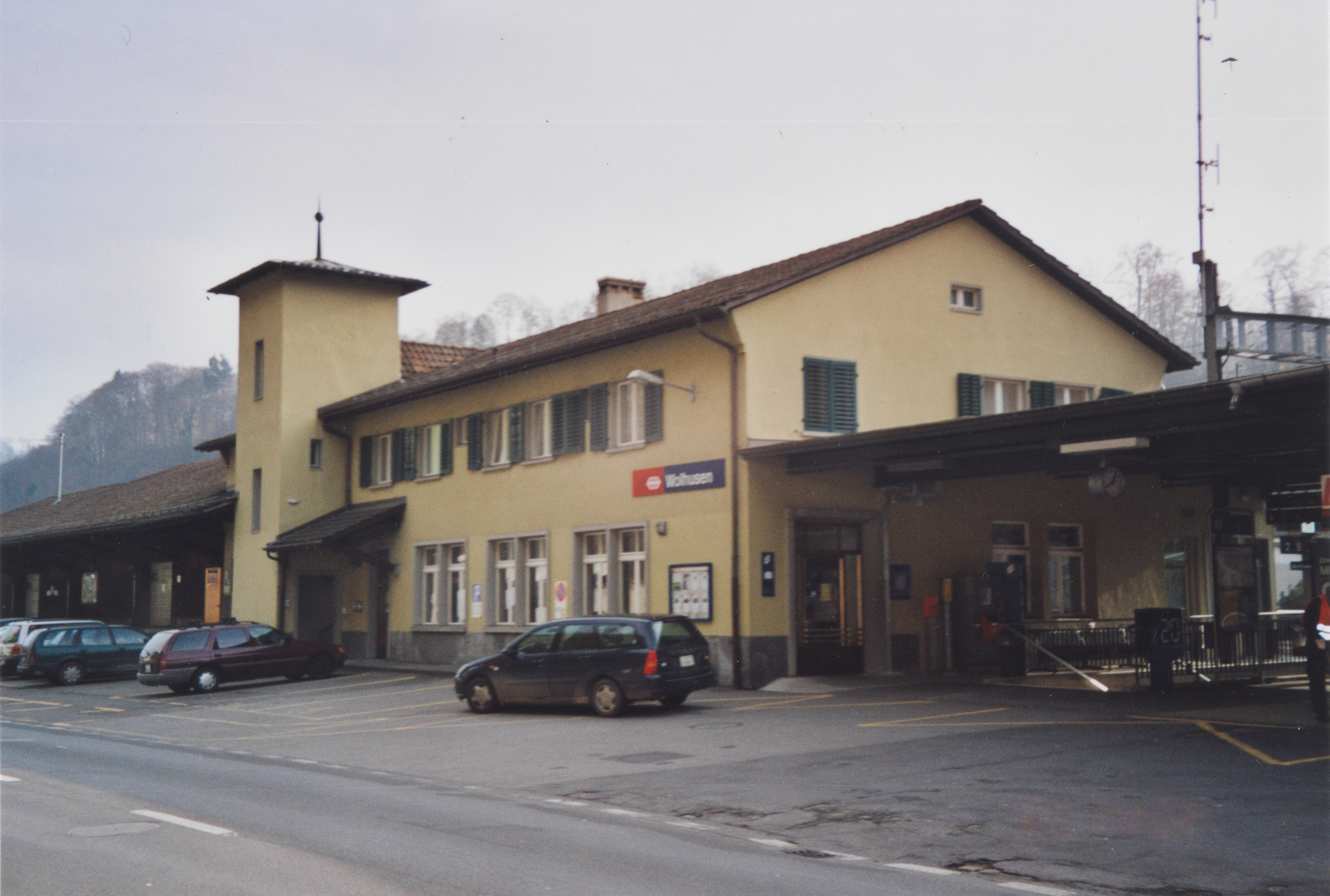
street-side in 2004

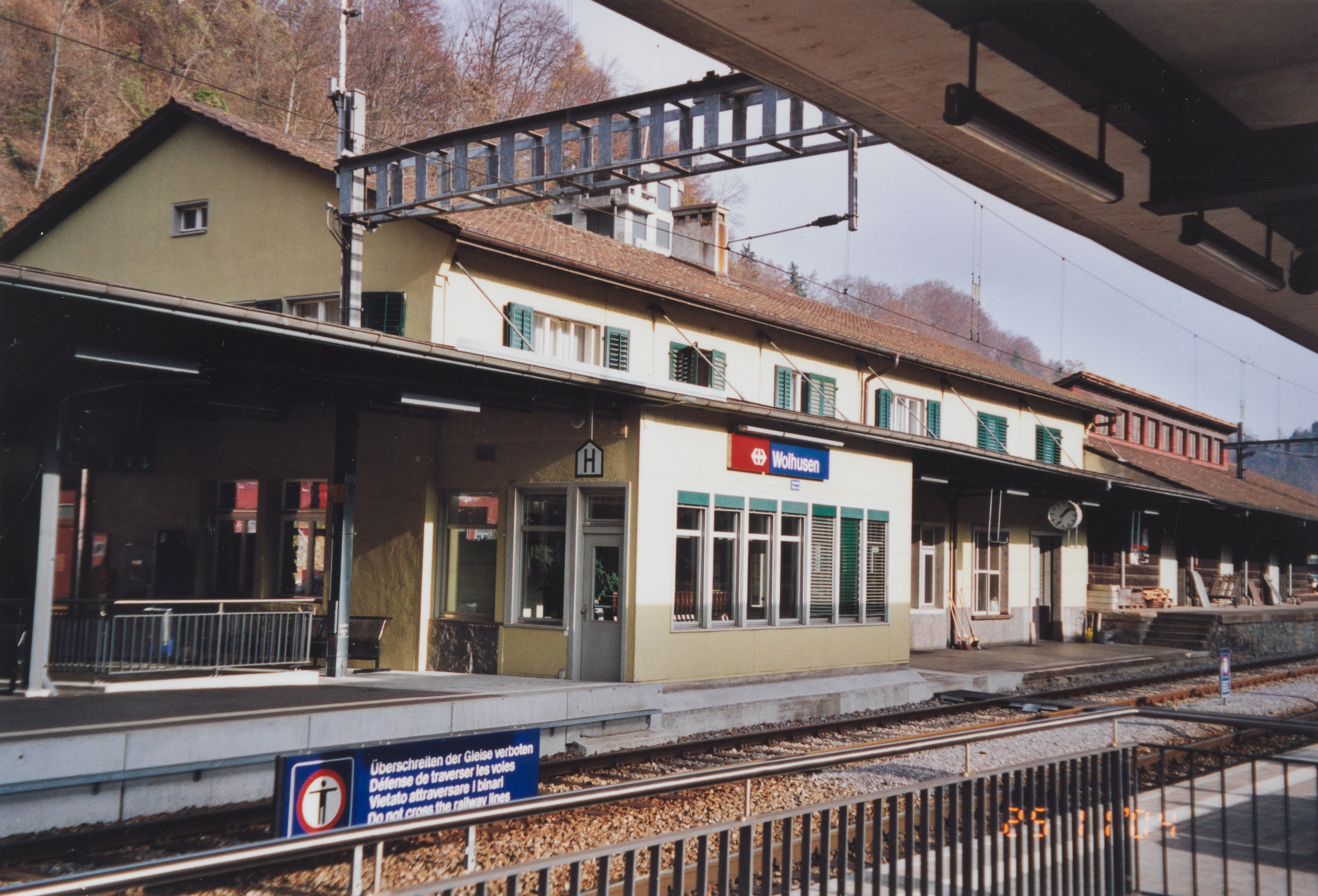
train-side in 2004

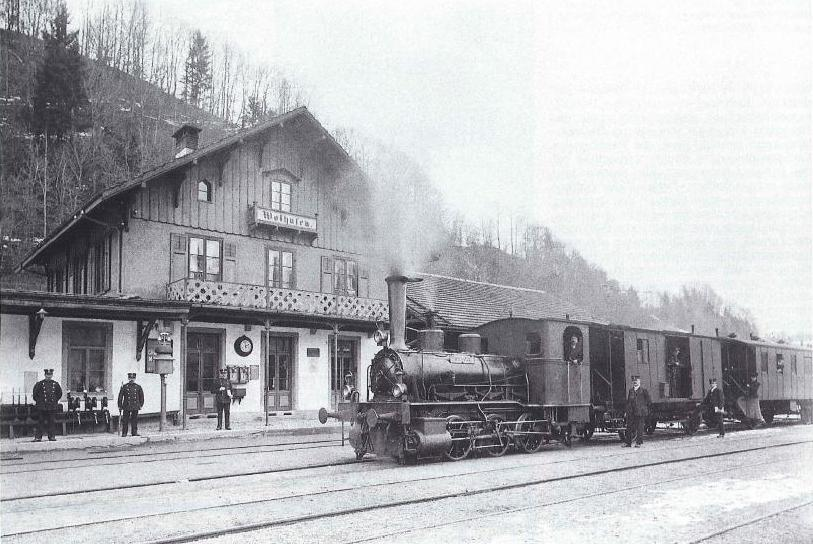
station in 1907 with train of Langenthal–Huttwil railway
