= List of Swiss tariff networks =

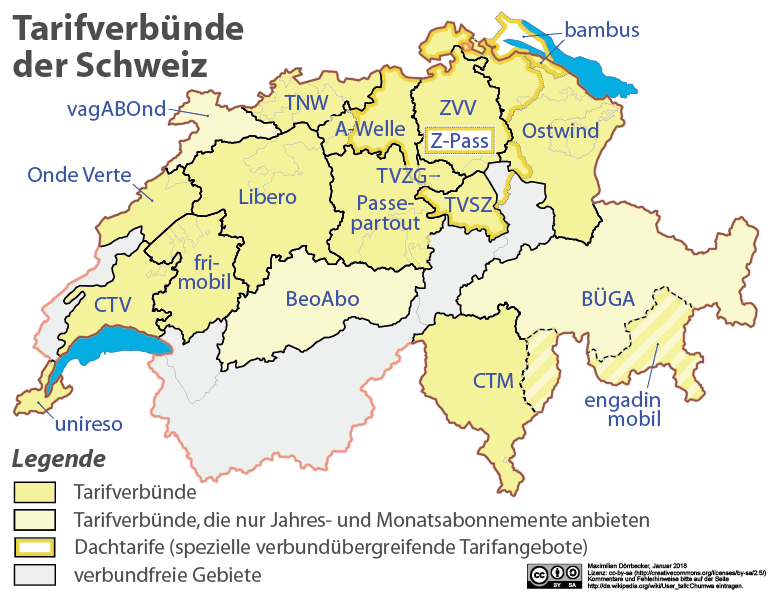
Map of tariff networks in Switzerland (as of 2018): Tariff associations Tariff associations with only annual and monthly subscriptions (framed: tariff associations with special offers overarching tariff networks) No tariff association

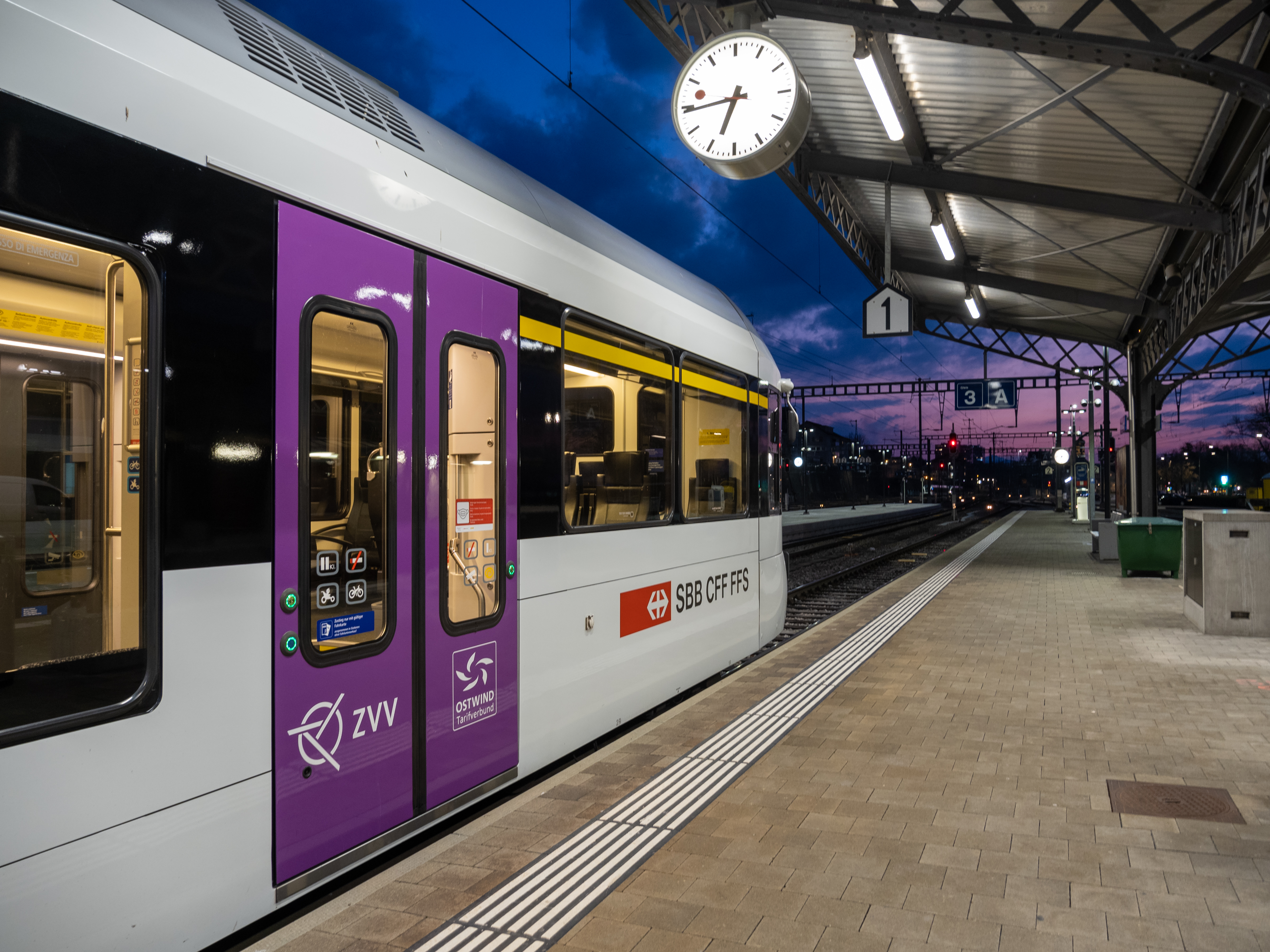
Thurbo train with logos of tariff associations on its doors

This list of Swiss tariff networks for public transport contains those with Swiss Federal Railways' participation. Within each tariff network, tickets and subscriptions apply to nearly all public transport, including rail, bus, some ships and some cable cars.

== History ==
Switzerland has had a national integrated ticketing system for over a hundred years. This, however, was limited to the regional and mainline services, as well as some tourist traffic. It was known that the not uniform pricing schedule and the participation of the individual companies could both be limited to certain parts of the entire network (single tickets, multi-journey tickets, season tickets, half-price tickets collective, etc.). In an effort to include local traffic therefore resulted in regional tariff networks, which initially covered only the subscriptions in the narrow context of larger cities. Thus, it was no longer necessary for commuters to purchase two or three passes for their commute. To provide this benefit also to other passengers, integral tariff networks emerged that cover the whole range of tickets. These grew into regional or national associations.

The first regional integrated ticketing system in Switzerland was the Tarifverbund Nordwestschweiz (TNW). lit. 'Tariff Association of Northwestern Switzerland', which was introduced in 1987. The first and only transport association is the Zürcher Verkehrsverbund (ZVV, lit. 'Zurich Transport Network'), which is in operation since 1990. The stated aim is to establish a pan-Switzerland ticketing system.

== Tables ==
=== Key to tables ===
- Logo: The current logo of the tariff association
- Abbreviations: The abbreviations often begin with either "T"/"TV" for Tarifverbund, or "CT" for Communauté tarifaire and Comunità tariffale, respectively (lit. 'Tariff Association').
- Full name and marketing name: Shows the official name first in one of the four languages of Switzerland, followed by the marketing name, if any, in guillemets.
- Regions: Areas included in the respective tariff network.
- Population: The number of residents connected to the network (as of 2007).
- Network length: The length of the entire route network in kilometers (and miles).
- Number of stops: The number of stops of a composite (as of 2007).

=== Networks with comprehensive ticket offerings ===
Logo	Abbreviation	Full name and marketing name	Regions	Population	Network length	Number of stops
	CTIFR	Tarifverbund Freiburg «frimobil»	Cantons of Fribourg and Vaud (only Broye district)	260,000	unknown	900
	CTGE	Tarifverbund Genf «unireso»	Canton of Geneva	445,000	450 km (280 mi)	1,522
	CTM	Comunità tariffale Ticino e Moesano «Arcobaleno»	Canton of Ticino and the Moesano district of the canton of Grisons (Graubünden)	329,955	1,314 km (816 mi)	1,613
	CTV	Communauté tarifaire vaudoise «mobilis»	Canton of Vaud	310,000	400 km (250 mi)	771
	OTV	Tarifverbund Ostwind	Cantons of Appenzell Ausserrhoden, Appenzell Innerrhoden, Glarus, Schaffhausen, (Note: Until 2017, the canton of Schaffhausen had its own tariff association called Flextax.) St. Gallen, Thurgau; Principality of Liechtenstein; Some regions in the cantons of Zurich and Schwyz and southern Baden Württemberg (Germany)	750,000	2,700 km (1,700 mi)	2,704
	TNW	Tarifverbund Nordwestschweiz «TNW»	Cantons of Basel-Stadt, Basel-Landschaft, Aargau (only Rheinfelden and Laufenburg counties), Solothurn (only Dorneck and Thierstein counties)	545,000	1,919 km (1,192 mi)	1,009
	TV-BE/SO	Tarifverbund Bern-Solothurn «Libero»	Canton of Bern, southwestern part of the canton of Solothurn	670,000	1,620 km (1,010 mi)	1,710
	TVAG	Tarifverbund A-Welle «A-Welle»	Canton of Aargau (with the exception of the Laufenburg and Rheinfelden districts), eastern part of the canton of Solothurn	607,000	unknown	1,576
	TVLU	Tarifverbund Passepartout	Cantons of Lucerne, Obwalden and Nidwalden	430,000	900 km (560 mi)	1,200
	TVOEng	Tarifverbund Oberengadin	Canton of Grisons (Graubünden)	unknown	unknown	62
	TVSZ	Tarifverbund Schwyz «Schwyzerpass»	Canton of Schwyz (with the exception of the Höfe and March districts)	75,000	270 km (170 mi)	360
	TVZG	Tarifverbund Zug «Zugerpass»	Canton of Zug	110,000	220 km (140 mi)	323
	ZVV	Zürcher Verkehrsverbund	Canton of Zurich (and adjacent areas of the cantons of Aargau, Schaffhausen, Schwyz, St. Gallen, Thurgau, Zug)	1,310,000	3,513 km (2,183 mi)	2,543

=== Networks offering transit passes only ===
Logo	Abbreviation	Full name and marketing name	Regions	Population	Network length	Number of stops
	CTJU	Tarifverbund Jura «vagABOnd»	Canton of Jura	90,000	342 km (213 mi)	318
	CTNE	Tarifverbund Neuenburg «Onde Verte»	Canton of Neuchâtel (Neuenburg)	200,000	600 km (370 mi)	619
	TVBI	Tarifverbund Biel/Bienne «ZigZag»	Agglomeration of Biel/Bienne, regions of Grenchen, Bernese Jura, Seeland	265,000	unknown	700
	TVBO	Tarifverbund Berner Oberland «BeoAbo»	Bernese Oberland	unknown	unknown	unknown
	TVWZ	Tarifverbund Wirtschaftsraum Zürich «Z-Pass»	Canton of Zurich and the surrounding cantons	1,700,000	unknown	unknown

== See also ==
- Transport in Switzerland
- Rail transport in Switzerland
- Federal Office of Transport
