= Willisau railway station =

Railway station in Willisau, Switzerland

Willisau
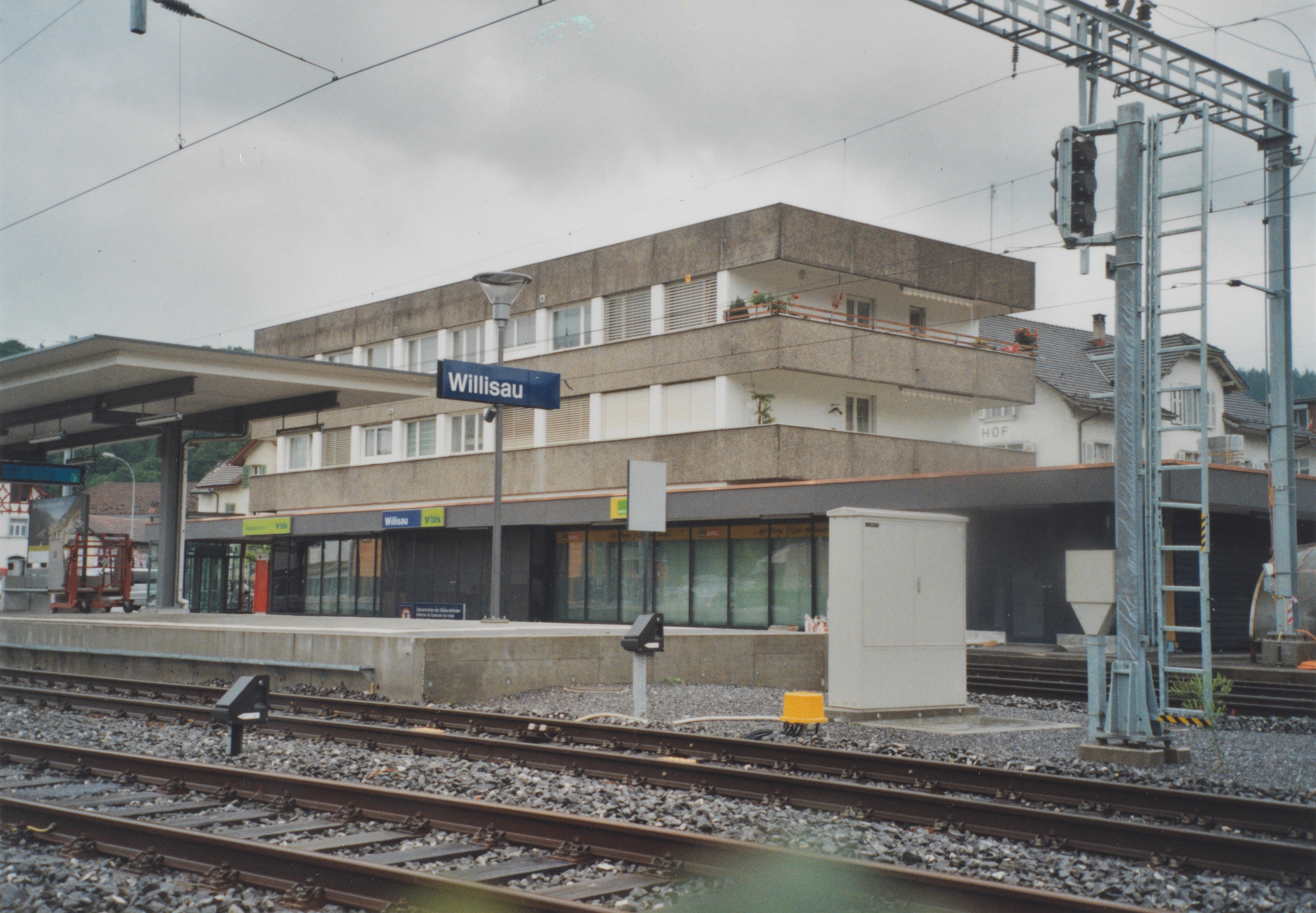
- The station in 2010

General information
- Location: Willisau; Switzerland
- Coordinates: 47°07′23″N 7°59′49″E
- Elevation: 555 m (1,821 ft)
- Owner: BLS AG
- Line: Huttwil–Wolhusen line
- Distance: 14.7 km (9.1 mi) from Huttwil
- Platforms: 3: 1 side platform; 1 island platform
- Tracks: 4
- Train operators: BLS AG
- Connections: PostAuto AG buses; Automobil Rottal AG buses

Construction
- Parking: Yes (108 spaces)
- Accessible: Yes

Other information
- Station code: 8508295 (WSAU)
- Fare zone: 45 (Passepartout)

Passengers
- 2023: 2'200 per weekday (BLS)

Services
Preceding station	Lucerne S-Bahn	Following station
Gettnau towards Langenthal	S6	Menznau towards Lucerne
Gettnau towards Langenthal	S7	Menznau towards Lucerne
Terminus	S77	Menznau towards Lucerne
Location

Willisau railway station (German: Bahnhof Willisau) is a railway station in the municipality of Willisau, in the Swiss canton of Lucerne. It is an intermediate stop on the standard gauge Huttwil–Wolhusen line of BLS AG.

== Services ==
As of the December 2024 timetable change, the following services stop at Willisau:

- Lucerne S-Bahn:
  - S6/S7: half-hourly service to Lucerne and half-hourly service (hourly on Sundays) to Langenthal. S7 trains operate combined with a RegioExpress between Wolhusen and Lucerne.
  - S77: rush-hour service to Lucerne.

== Gallery ==
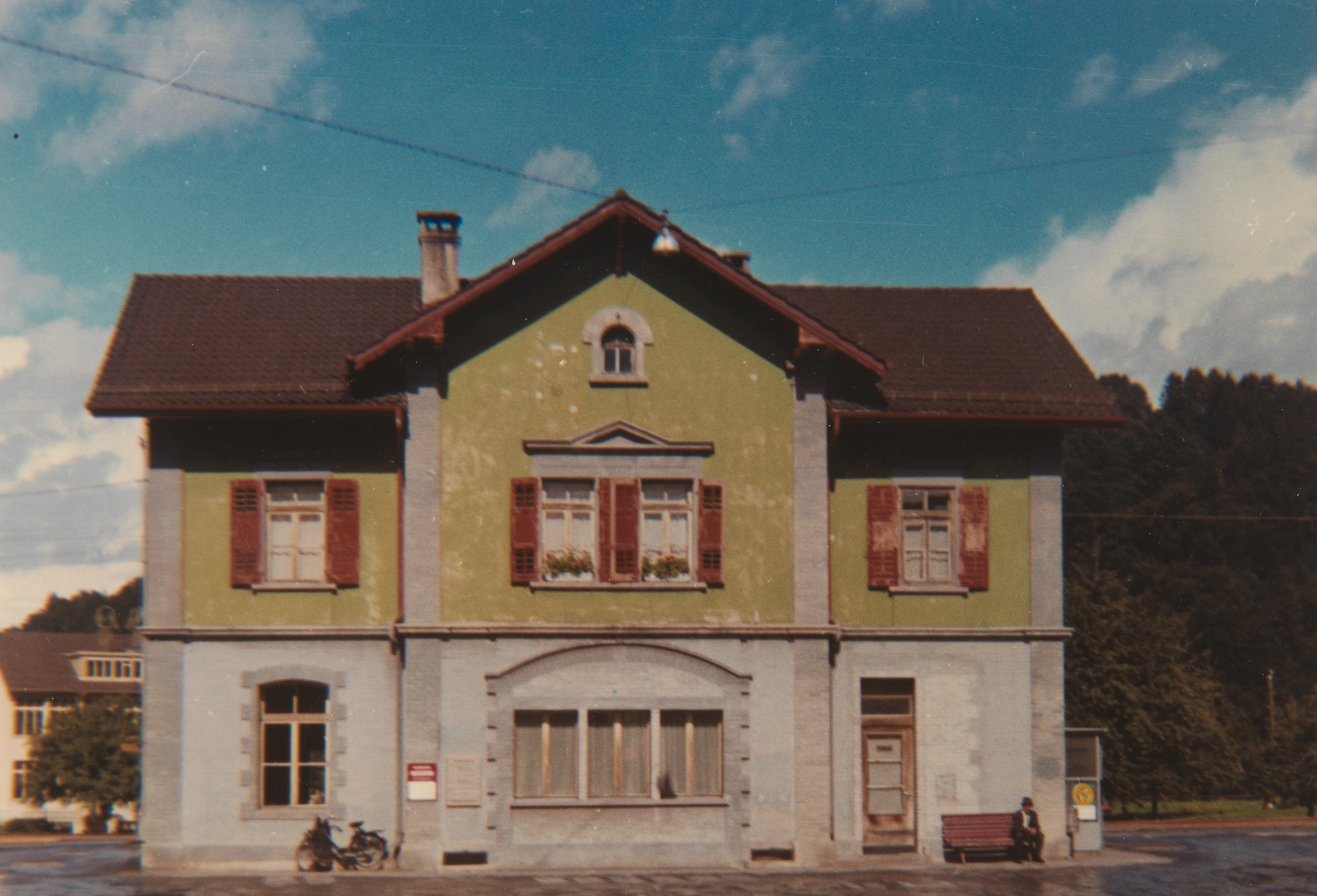
old station building in ca. 1978

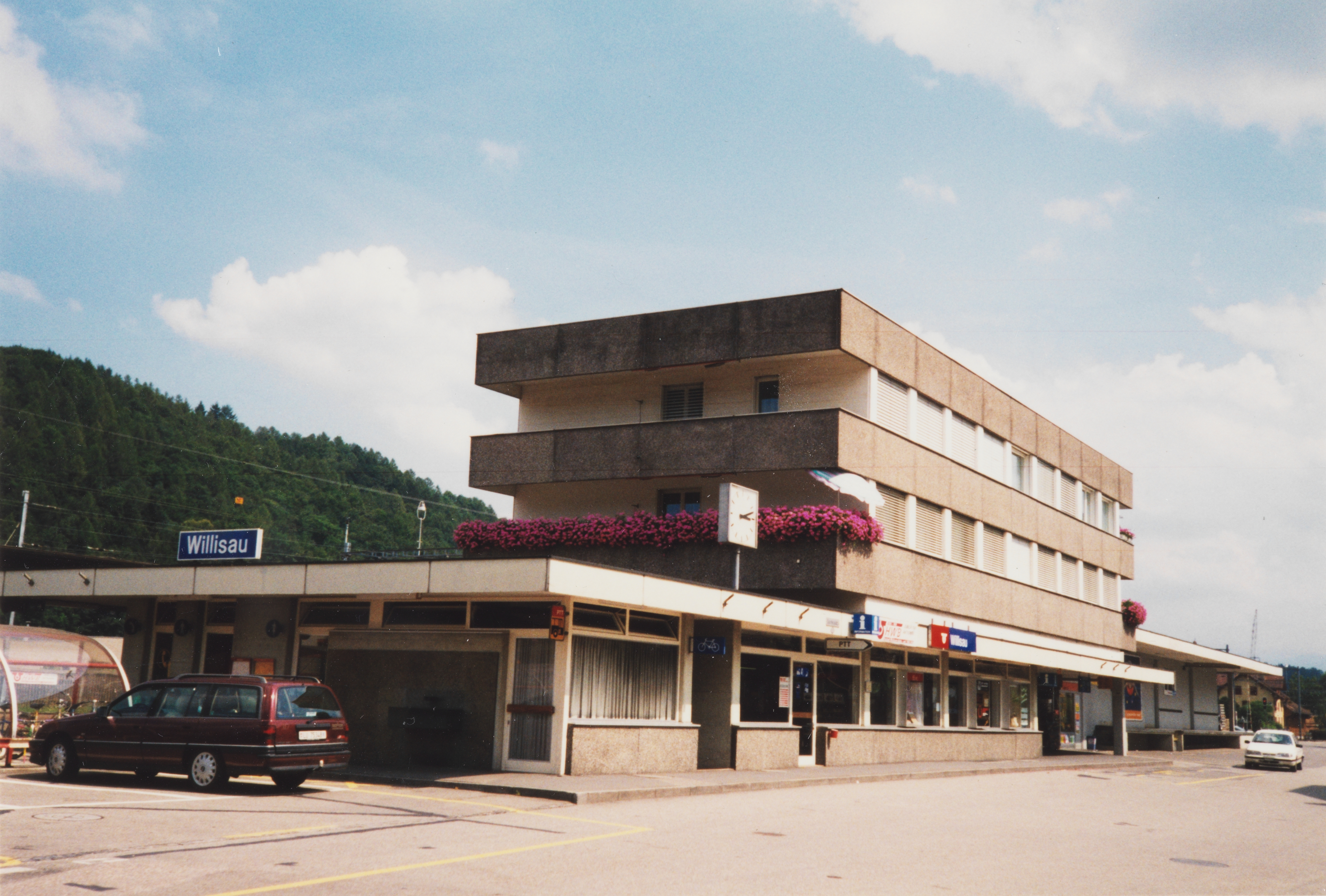
station building, street-side in 1995
