= Lucerne railway station =

Railway station in Lucerne, Switzerland

Luzern
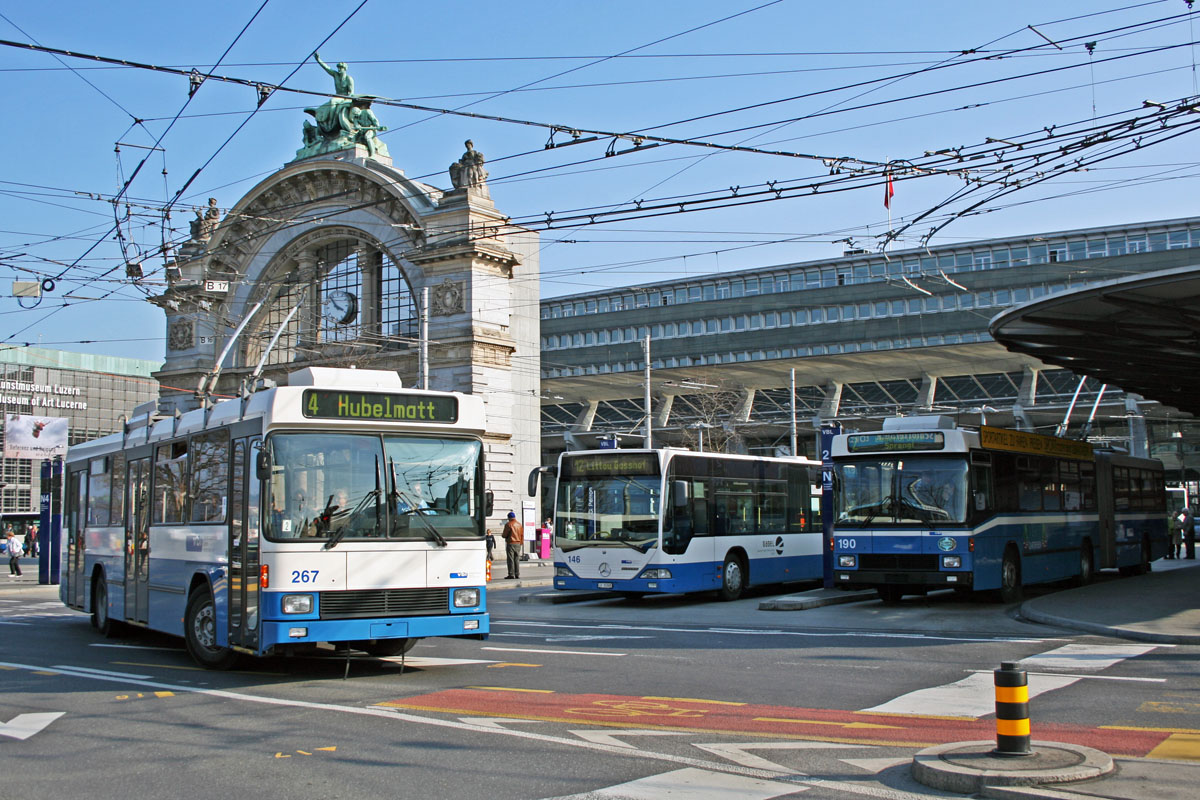
- Bus station in front of the railway station

General information
- Location: Lucerne; Switzerland
- Coordinates: 47°03′01″N 8°18′37″E
- Elevation: 436 m (1,430 ft)
- Owner: Swiss Federal Railways
- Lines: Bern–Lucerne line; Brünig line; Lucerne–Immensee line; Olten–Lucerne line; Seetal line; Zug–Lucerne line
- Distance: 95.0 km (59.0 mi) from Bern; 95.0 km (59.0 mi) from Basel SBB
- Platforms: 7 island platforms
- Tracks: 14
- Train operators: BLS AG; Südostbahn; Swiss Federal Railways; Zentralbahn
- Connections: Verkehrsbetriebe Luzern bus and trolleybus lines; Lake Lucerne Navigation Company ferries at Luzern Bahnhofquai

Construction
- Parking: Yes
- Cycle facilities: Yes
- Accessible: Yes
- Architect: 1856: Ammann + Baumann; 1896: Hans Wilhelm Auer; 1989: Santiago Calatrava

Other information
- Station code: 8505000 (LZ)
- IATA code: QLJ
- Fare zone: 10 (Passepartout)

History
- Opened: 1856
- Rebuilt: 1896; 1983–1989

Key dates
- 5 February 1971: A fire fully destroyed the building

Passengers
- 2025: 108,800 per day (BLS, SBB, SOB, Zentralbahn)
- Rank: 3 out of 1,095

Services
Preceding station	SBB CFF FFS	Following station
Olten towards Frankfurt (Main) Hbf	EuroCity	Reverses direction
Arth-Goldau towards Milano Porta Garibaldi	EuroCity	Reverses direction
Olten towards Basel SBB	IC 21	Reverses direction
Arth-Goldau towards Lugano	IC 21	Reverses direction
Sursee towards Geneva Airport	IR 15	Terminus
Sursee towards Basel SBB	IR 27	Terminus
Zug towards Zürich Hauptbahnhof	IR 70	Terminus
Rotkreuz towards Konstanz	IR 75	Terminus
Emmenbrücke towards Olten	RE24	Terminus
Preceding station	Zentralbahn	Following station
Sarnen towards Interlaken Ost	Panorama Express Luzern-Interlaken Express	Terminus
Stans towards Engelberg	InterRegio Luzern-Engelberg Express	Terminus
Preceding station	Südostbahn	Following station
Lucerne Verkehrshaus towards St. Gallen	Voralpen Express	Terminus
Olten towards Basel SBB	IR 26	Reverses direction
Arth-Goldau towards Locarno	IR 26	Reverses direction
Preceding station	BLS	Following station
Malters towards Bern, Willisau or Langenthal	RE7	Terminus
Preceding station	Lucerne S-Bahn	Following station
Emmenbrücke towards Sursee	S1	Reverses direction
Ebikon towards Baar	S1	Reverses direction
Lucerne Verkehrshaus towards Brunnen	S3	Terminus
Luzern Allmend/Messe towards Wolfenschiessen	S4	Terminus
Luzern Allmend/Messe towards Giswil	S5	Terminus
Luzern Littau towards Langenthal or Langnau i.E.	S6	Terminus
Emmenbrücke towards Lenzburg	S9	Terminus
Luzern Allmend/Messe towards Horw	S41	Terminus
Hergiswil towards Stans	S44	Terminus
Hergiswil towards Sachseln	S55	Terminus
Luzern Littau towards Willisau	S77	Terminus
Emmenbrücke towards Hochdorf	S99	Terminus
Location
- Location within Switzerland Location within Canton of Lucerne

Lucerne railway station (German: Bahnhof Luzern) is a major hub of the rail network of Switzerland, in the city of Lucerne in the canton of Lucerne. It is a terminal station serving domestic and international traffic on several rail lines, and is situated in a city centre and waterfront location on the south side of Lake Lucerne.

== History ==
The first station was opened on edge of Lake Lucerne in 1856 at the end of the Schweizerische Centralbahn main line from Olten and Basel where it connected with the French and German railways. The route of the railway—now the course of Pilatusstrasse (Pilatus Street)—was still undeveloped. The terminal station led directly to the pier for boat services on the lake and to the gates of the city of Lucerne. As a result, the area at the lake shore developed into an important railway junction. In the 19th century it rapidly developed into a hub with the introduction of steam navigation on the lake and the construction of several railway lines: the Gotthard railway, the line to Bern via Wolhusen, the line to Zug and Zürich and the metre-gauge Brünig railway. The first station was made of wood.

A new station, designed by Hans Wilhelm Auer was opened in 1896 with a large new building with a distinctive cupola. It was turned at almost 90° to the original station with its end to the north towards the bridge to central Lucerne, requiring a significantly changed approach line. The new approach had no level crossings of streets unlike the original route, but instead ran on embankments or in cuttings. The Brünig railway was also integrated into the new station. The tracks were electrified in 1922 along with the line from Olten. By 1910 the new station was nearing its capacity limits and an expansion plan was developed. However, the start of World War I prevented any work being carried out.

On the morning of 5 February 1971, fire broke out in the staff quarters of the station. The fire was detected shortly after eight am, and at 8.18 the police were called. That day, the last train arrived 8.56am and the last departure of a train was 9 am. The building burnt fiercely, and within an hour the cupola had collapsed, destroying the station frontage and concourse. The service was restored with temporary buildings, allowing operations to be recommenced. In 1980 a partnership of the Swiss Federal Railways, Swiss Post, the city and canton of Lucerne launched an architecture competition for a comprehensive redevelopment of the station. This also considered the future development of the rail approaches to Lucerne. However, a through station with a tunnel under Lake Lucerne was ruled out.

A new station was eventually built, and opened on 5 February 1991, exactly 20 years after its predecessor was destroyed. The new station was planned by the architectural firm of Ammann and Baumann, and their then employee, Santiago Calatrava, designed the concourse of the new station. This is said to be the "heart of the new station, ... a multi-storey, generous sized public space that links the various functions of the city center with the railway". Its platforms are longer than those of the old station, and the underground shopping arcade is much larger. In front of the new station stands the arch of the old one, with the sculpture Zeitgeist by Richard Kissling on top.

In late 2012, a new tunnel route was opened on the Brünig line, between Kriens Mattenhof station and the approaches to Lucerne station. The tunnel replaces a less direct surface alignment, allowing the removal of several congested level crossings and the provision of double track, but terminal platforms used by Brünig line trains remain unchanged.

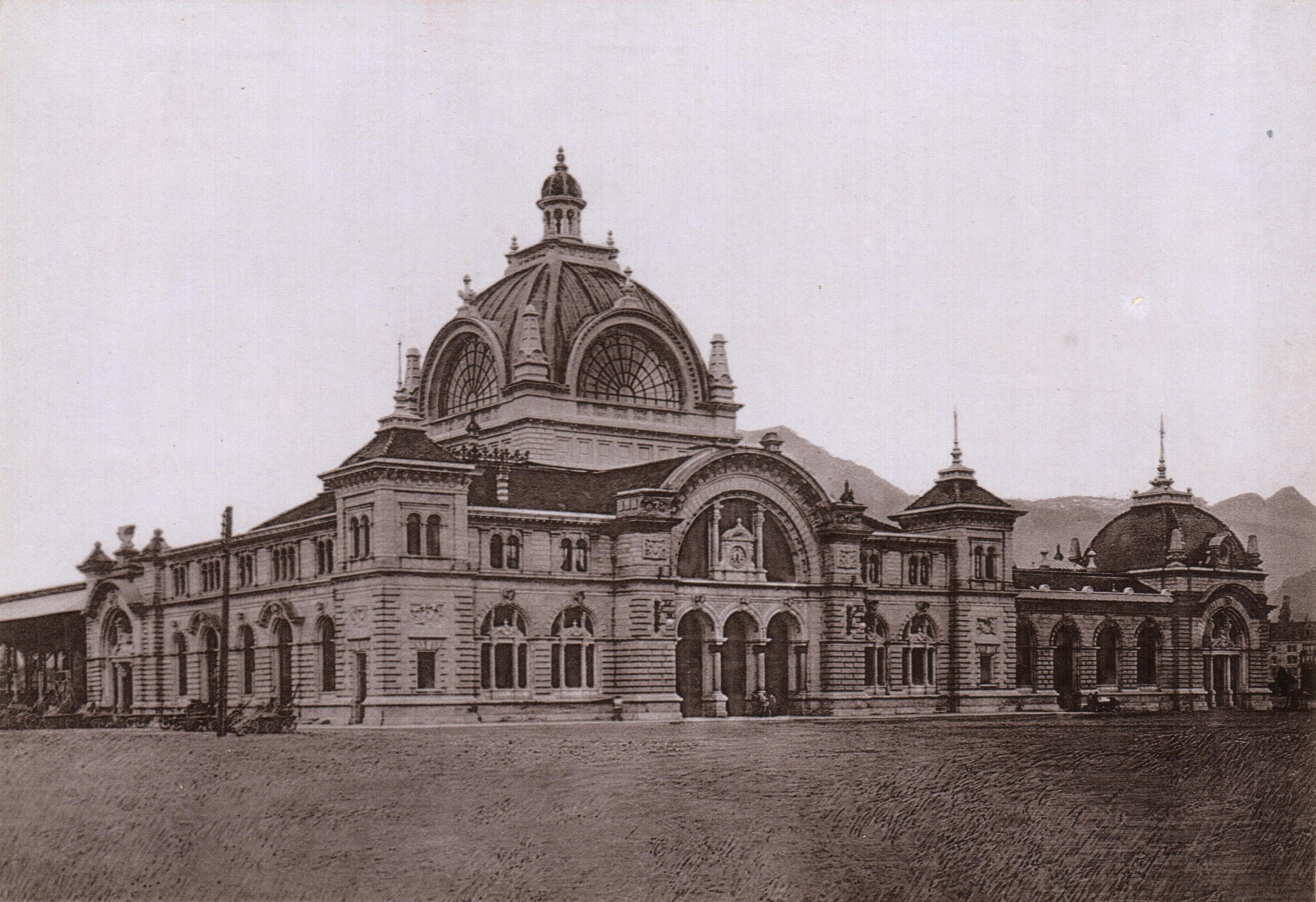
An early photograph of the 1896 station

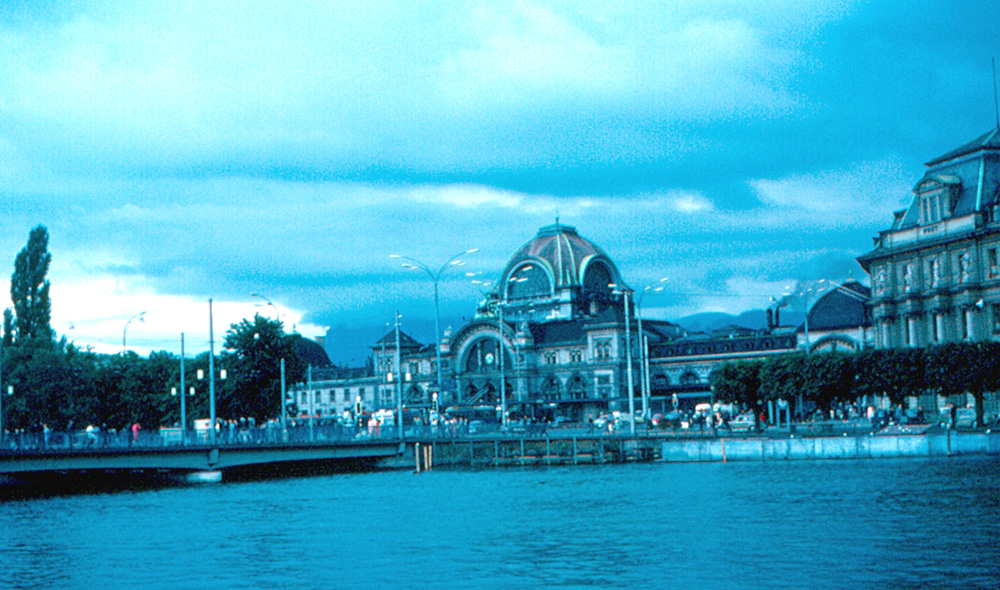
The same station in 1965, six years before it burnt down

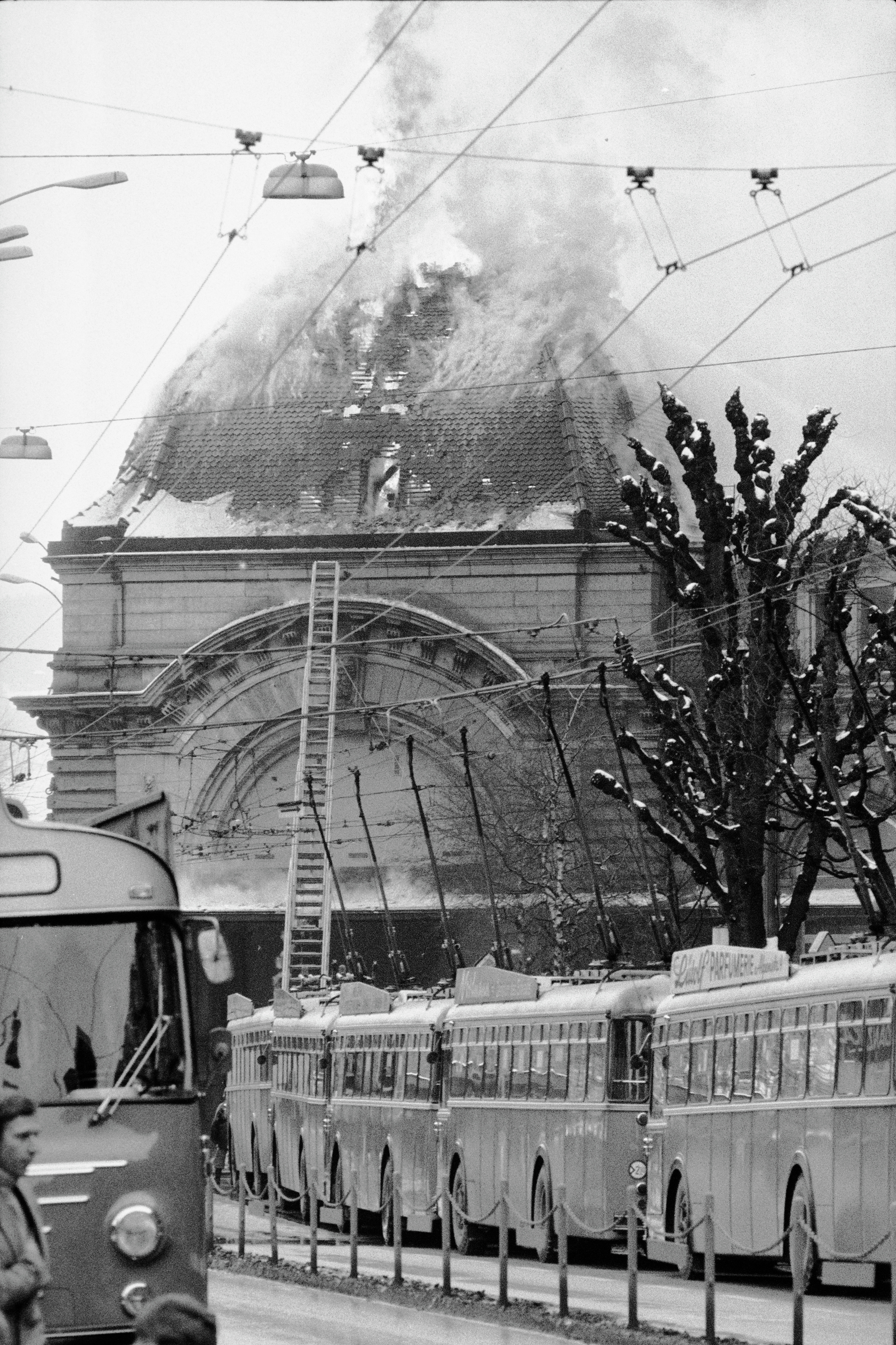
The fire of 1971

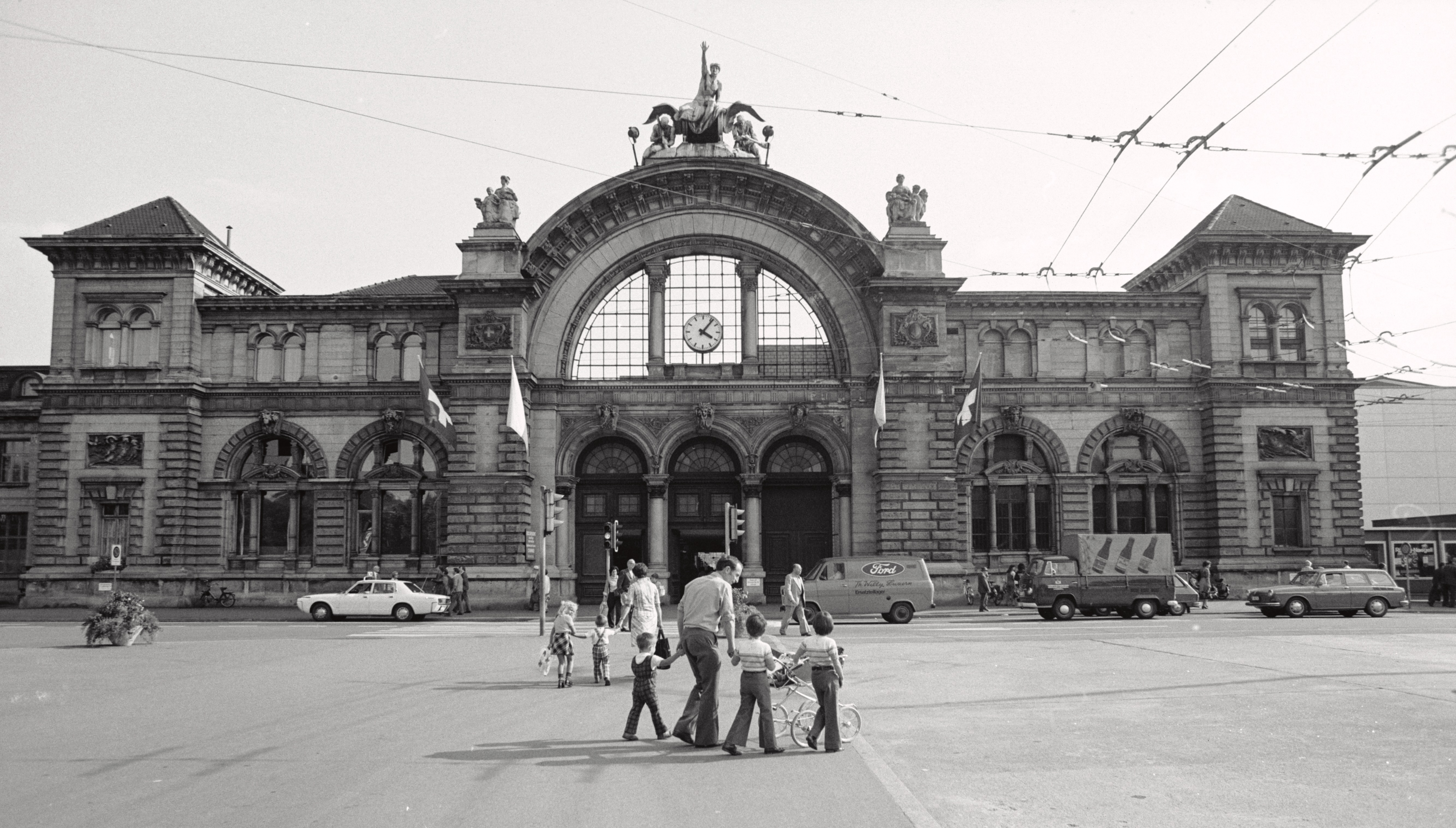
The old façade in 1976 – five years after the fire destroyed the station's interior, but before most of the main façade was demolished

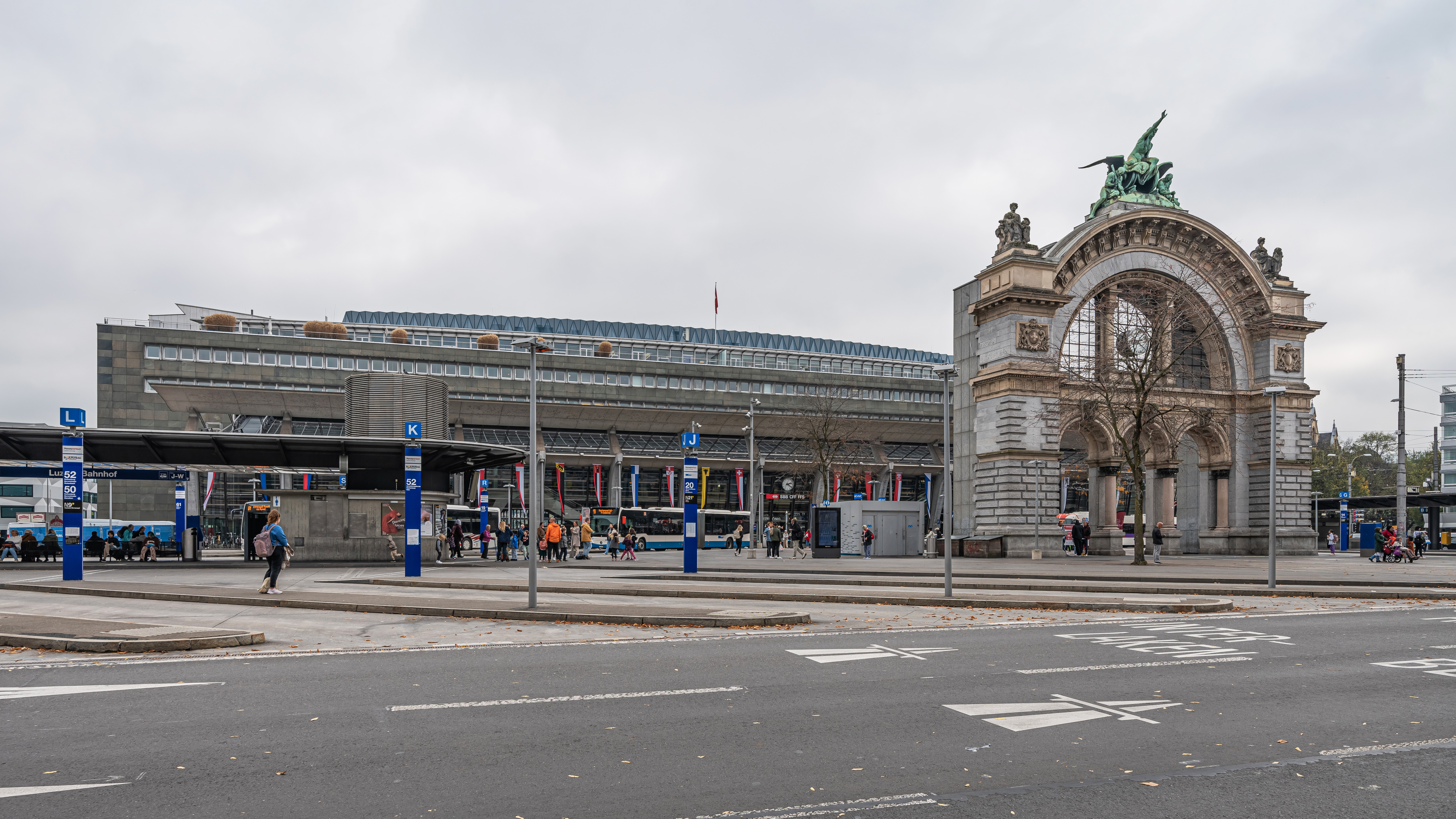
The arc that now remains of the old station, with the sculpture Zeitgeist by Richard Kissling on top, with the new station frontage behind

== Operation ==
The station is a terminal station serving domestic and international traffic on several rail lines. The lines from the east (Zürich–Lucerne and the Gotthard lines) pass to the north of Lucerne and then join the lines from the north (Olten–Lucerne line) and the west (Bern–Wolhusen–Lucerne line) and pass to the west of Lucerne before turning to approach the station from the south. The metre-gauge Brünig railway from the south and Interlaken also terminates at the station. The station has seven island platforms with fourteen tracks, numbered 2–15.

Bahnhofplatz occupies the area between the front of the station and the lakefront, and is heavily used by the local buses. The landing stages used by the passenger ships of the Schifffahrtsgesellschaft des Vierwaldstättersees (SGV) at Luzern Bahnhofquai occupy the lakeside of Bahnhofplatz, providing interchange between rail and water transport. The steamer operated section of the Gotthard Panorama Express departs from here on its voyage to Flüelen station at the other end of the lake, where passengers change into a panoramic train for the journey across the original line of the Gotthard railway to Bellinzona and Lugano.

An underground shopping mall lies below both the concourse of the railway station and Bahnhofplatz.

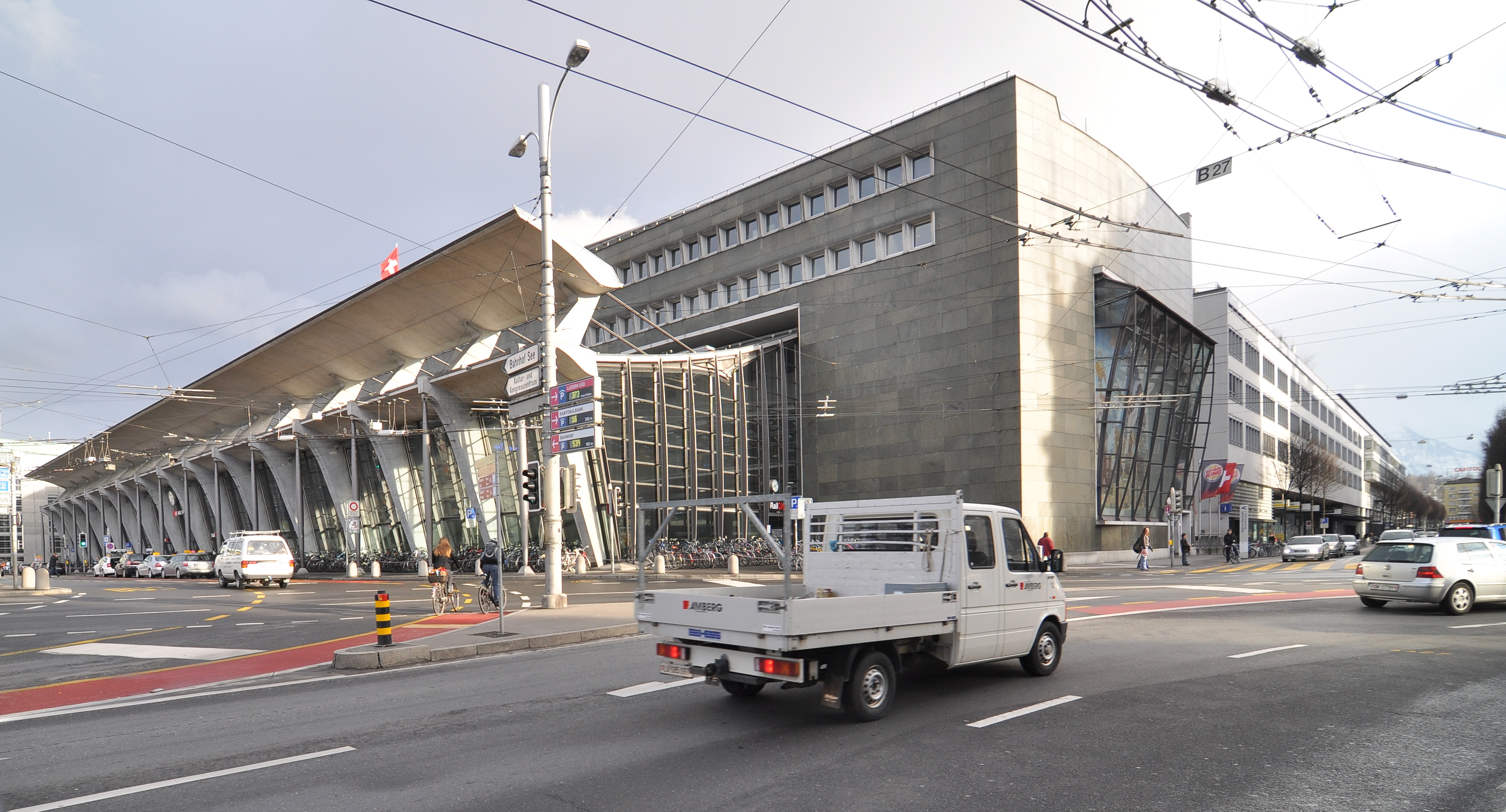
The modern station frontage

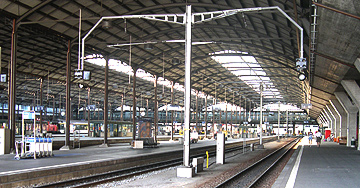
The interior of the train shed and platforms

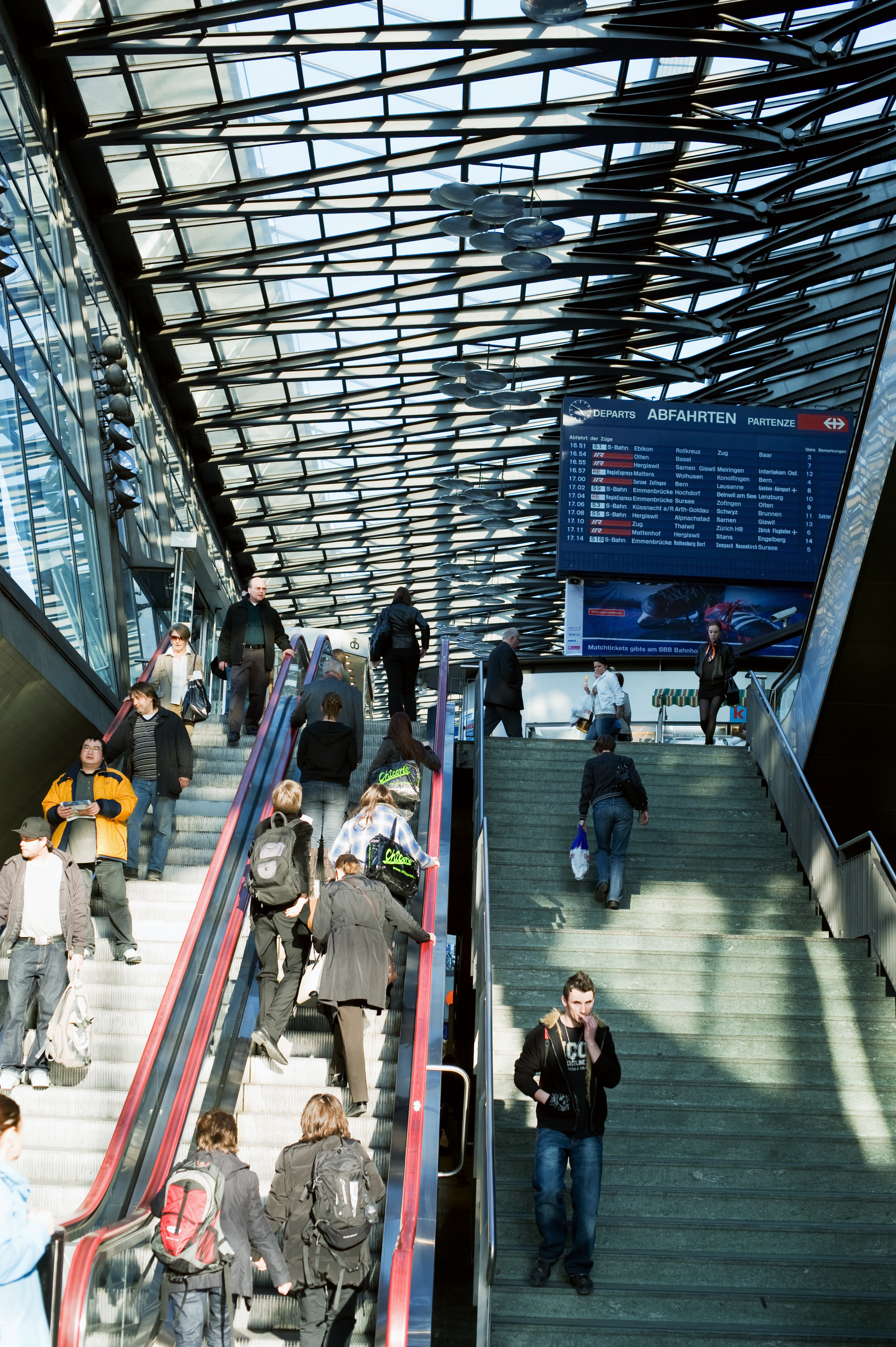
Access to the underground level of the station

== Services ==
As of the December 2024 timetable change, the following services stop at Lucerne:

- EuroCity/InterCity: service every two hours between Basel SBB and Lugano; EuroCity continues from Lugano to Milano Porta Garibaldi.
- Panorama Express : Luzern-Interlaken Express: hourly service to Interlaken Ost.
- InterRegio:
  - Voralpen Express: hourly service to St. Gallen.
  - Luzern-Engelberg Express: hourly service to Engelberg.
  - half-hourly service to Zürich Hauptbahnhof, with every other train continuing to Konstanz.
  - hourly service to Geneva Airport.
  - one or two trains per hour to Basel SBB and one train every two hours to Locarno.
- RegioExpress/Lucerne S-Bahn S6: half-hourly service to Langnau i.E., with every other train continuing from Langnau i.E. to Bern.
- RegioExpress: hourly service to Olten.
- Lucerne S-Bahn:
  - S1: half-hourly service between Sursee and Baar.
  - S3: hourly service to Brunnen.
  - S4: half-hourly service to Stans, with every other train continuing to Wolfenschiessen.
  - S41: weekday rush-hour service to Horw.
  - S44: rush-hour service to Stans.
  - S5: half-hourly service to Giswil.
  - S55: rush-hour service to Sachseln.
  - S6/S7: half-hourly service to Willisau; all S6 and some S7 trains continue to Langenthal.
  - S77: rush-hour service to Willisau.
  - S9: half-hourly service to Lenzburg.
  - S99: rush-hour service to Hochdorf.

== Future proposals ==
In 2009, a study was initiated into the building of a new underground through station next to the current terminus, and after studying some 30 variants, the chosen variant was announced in July 2013. This involves the construction of a new 3.5-kilometre (2.2 mi) tunnel from Ebikon station, on the Zürich to Lucerne line, under the end of Lake Lucerne to an interim underground terminal station immediately to the east of the existing station. A second phase will add a second, 2-kilometre-long (1.2 mi), tunnel to join the standard gauge approach to the existing station at Heimbach, thus converting the underground station into a through station.

If executed, this will significantly increase capacity on the Zürich to Lucerne line, by avoiding a single-track section of the existing line, and avoiding conflicts with the other standard gauge lines into the station. However, before the line can be built, the line must be funded. The first phase alone is estimated to cost CHF2.4 billion, and will be the subject of legislation and a national referendum, probably in 2014.

== See also ==
- History of rail transport in Switzerland
- Rail transport in Switzerland
