= Verkehrsbetriebe Luzern =

Swiss transport company

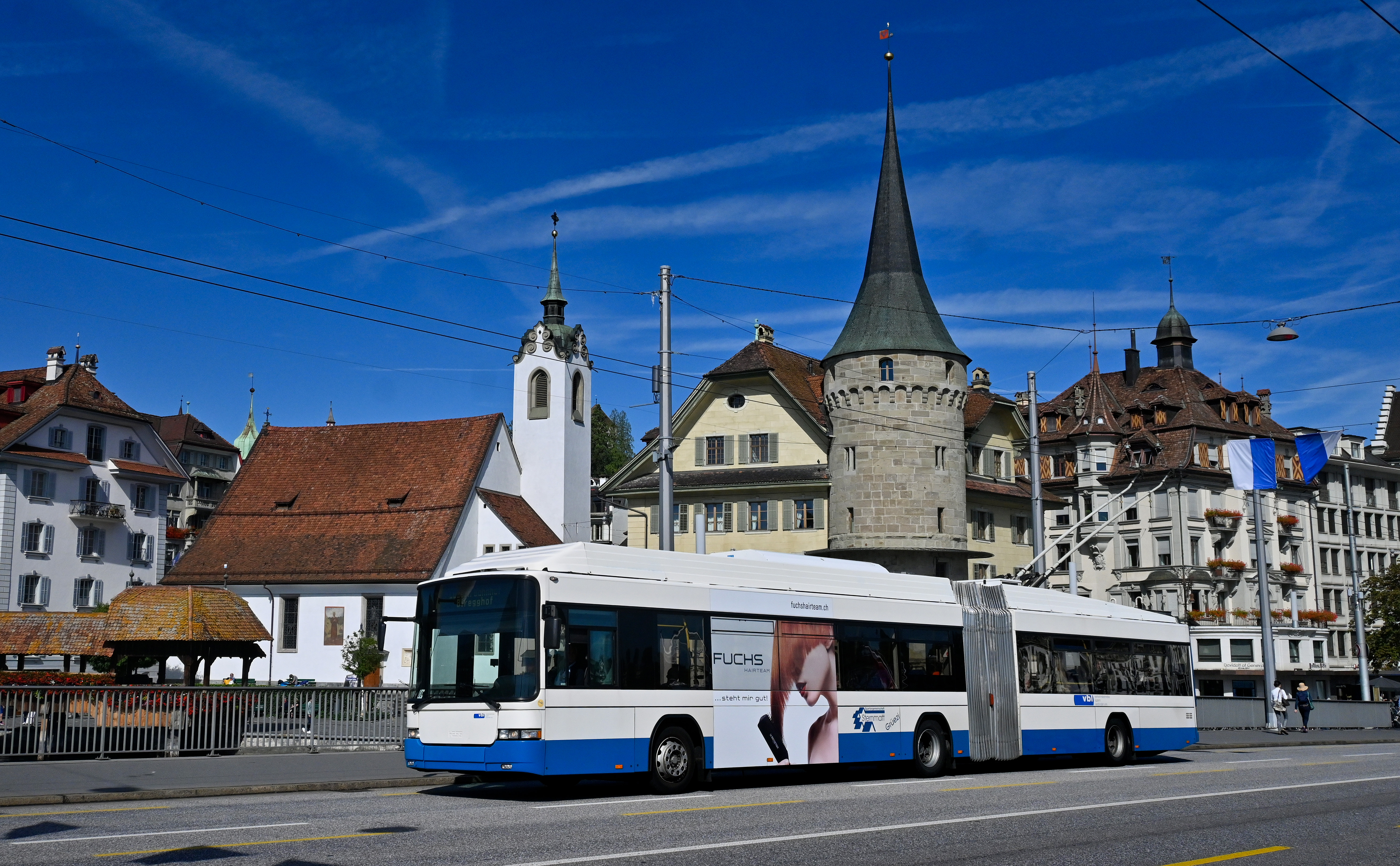
- Owner: City of Lucerne (100% equity)
- Number of employees: ~550
- Website: https://www.vbl.ch/

Verkehrsbetriebe Luzern AG (abbr. VBL, English: Lucerne Transit Agency) is the main provider of public transport in the Swiss city of Lucerne. It operates 8 Hybrid buses, 3 electric buses, 34 double-articulated trolleybuses, 30 articulated trolleybuses and 76 buses for a total of 159 buses on 23 daytime routes, as well as 11 overnight services (known as Nachstern) and one funicular service.

== History ==
VBL dates back to December 1899, when the first tramway in the city of Lucerne, was opened. Over the period 1909–1936, the tramway was extended to the Emmenbrücke and Kriens areas. The late 1920s and early 1930s saw the first bus services being introduced to the city. Initial proposals for a trolleybus system in 1938 were rejected by the citizens of Lucerne, however further proposals in 1941 were met with a far more positive response, and the first line was opened between Lucerne station and Allmend. Trolleybuses gradually replaced trams in the city, and the tramway was finally closed in 1961. The Lucerne trolleybus system was upgraded in 1965/66 with the introduction of 14 new articulated trolleybuses. The 1970s revolutionised the way tickets were bought on the bus and trolleybus networks, with most now being purchased from roadside vending machines. In the 1980s several motorbus lines were converted to trolleybuses. The fleet was upgraded in 1985 with the purchase of 54 new vehicles. A new fare system was introduced in 1991, with the network being divided into various zones. In the same year, VBL took delivery of 4 new articulated trolleybuses and 6 articulated motorbuses. The start of the 21st century brought with it a large intake of new vehicles, with both motorbuses and trolleybuses being delivered. VBL now boasts a very modern fleet, with the Mercedes-Benz Citaro comprising a large portion of the bus fleet.

== Nachtstern ==
Nachtstern is the name given to the network of night-time bus routes serving the city of Luzern, Switzerland and its surrounding areas. Most of the routes are operated by VBL, although some are operated by other companies.

=== History ===
The first night-time route in Luzern was started in 1997 and operated between Luzern and Engelberg, although the Nachtstern network itself was not launched until 2000, when lines N1/2/3/4 were introduced. Initially, lines N1/2 were operated by trolleybuses, however today all routes on the network are operated by diesel buses. The network has been extended gradually since 2003, and currently there are 11 lines on the network that go through Lucerne.

== Routes ==
=== Trolleybus routes ===
Number	Route
1	Obernau - Kriens - Luzern Bahnhof (Lucerne railway station) - Maihof - Ebikon Fildern
2	Emmenbrücke Sprengi - Emmenbrücke Bahnhof - Luzern Bahnhof
4	Hubelmatt - Luzern Bahnhof
5	Kriens Busschleife - Pilatusplatz - Emmenbrücke Bahnhof Süd
6	Matthof - Bundesplatz - Luzern Bahnhof - Luzernerhof - Brüelstrasse - Büttenenhalde
7	Biregghof - Bundesplatz - Luzern Bahnhof - Luzernerhof - Zwyssigplatz - Unterlöchli
8	Hirtenhof - Bundesplatz - Luzern Bahnhof - Luzernerhof - Brüelstrasse - Würzenbach

=== Bus routes ===
Number	Route
9	Bramberg - Luzern Bahnhof
10	Obergütsch - Luzern Bahnhof
11	Dattenberg - Eichhof - Luzern Bahnhof
12	Luzern Gasshof - Luzern Bahnhof
14	Brüelstrasse - St. Anna - Luzern Bahnhof - Pilatusplatz - Eichhof - Grosshofstrasse - Nidfeld - Grabenhof - Pilatusmarkt - Horw Zentrum
15	Kriens - Zumhof/Senti/Bachstrasse/Bergstrasse/Sidhalde - Kriens
16	Kriens - Mattenhof - Kuonimatt - Pilatusmarkt - Horw Zentrum - Spitz
19	Friedental - Kantonsspittal - Scholssberg - Luzern Bahnhof
20	Ennethorw/Technikumstrasse - Horw Zentrum - Wegscheide]- Luzern Bahnhof
21	Kriens - Mattenhof - Pilatusmarkt - Horw Steinbach - Wegscheide - Kastanienbaum - St. Niklausen - Luzern Bahnhof
22	Gisikon Root Bahnhof - Perlen - Buchrain - Ebikon Bahnhof
23	Gisikon Weitblick - Dierikon - Ebikon Bahnhof
24	Meggen Tschädigen/Meggen Gottlieben - Lerchenbühl - Luzern Bahnhof
25	(Meggen Gottlieben -) Meggen Piuskirche - Brüelstrasse
26	Ottigenbühl - Ebikon Bahnhof - Unterlöchli - Adligenswil - Brüelstrasse
30	Luzern Littau Bahnhof - Kantonsspital - Ebikon Bahnhof

=== Nachtstern routes ===
Number	Route
N1	Obernau - Kriens - Luzern < Luzern - Ebikon - Buchrain - Perlen - Root - Gisikon
N2	Luzern - Reussbühl - Emmenbrücke - Emmen
N3	Luzern - Verkehrshaus - Meggen - Merlischachen - Küssnacht am Rigi
N4	Luzern - Horw - Hergiswil NW - Stansstad - Stans < Stans - Luzern
N5	Luzern - Sarnen
N6	Luzern - Littau - Wolhusen - Menznau < Menznau - Wolhusen - Reussbühl - Luzern
N9	Luzern - Eschenbach - Hochdorf - Hitzkirch - Beinwil am See
N12	Luzern - Littau
N14	Luzern - St. Anna - Brüelstrasse - Büttenhalde
N20	Luzern Bahnhof - Hubelmatt - Horw Zentrum
N21	Luzern Bahnhof - Kastanienbaum - Horw Zentrum - Kriens

=== Funicular ===
The VBL operates the recently reopened Gütschbahn funicular.

== Rolling stock ==
The bus fleet has been modernised over the past few years, with the introduction of both rigid and articulated Mercedes-Benz Citaro vehicles, which have been placed into service at various points since 1998.

=== Motor buses ===
The current motor bus fleet is as follows:

- 38 Mercedes-Benz Citaro (1998–2006)
- 31 Mercedes-Benz Citaro articulated (2002–2006)
- 3 Volvo (1996)
- 4 Mercedes-Benz O405N2 (1995–1997)
- 2 Mercedes-Benz O405N (1993)
- 2 Scania/Hess N94UB (2005)
- 2 Volvo B10L (1996)
- 1 Mercedes-Benz 416CDI (2002)
- 1 Neoplan N4009 (1994)
- 1 Neoplan N4411 (2001)

=== Trolleybuses ===
The trolleybus fleet has also been modernised in recent years, including the arrival of the company's first bi-articulated trolleybuses in 2006. The non-articulated trolleybuses haul trailers (see next section) on some routes.

The current trolleybus fleet is as follows:

- 29 NAW/Hess/Siemens BG5-25 (1988–1989)
- 19 NAW/Hess/Siemens BG5-25 articulated (1987–1991)
- 9 Hess/Vossloh Kiepe BGT-N2C articulated (2004–2006)
- 3 Hess/Vossloh-Kiepe BGGT-N2C lighTram 3 double-articulated (2006)

=== Trailers ===
- 16 Lanz & Marti/Hess APM 5.6-13 trailers (1998–2005)

== Livery ==
VBL buses and trolleybuses are now painted in a livery which is mainly white, with blue finish. Previously, the livery was the reverse of this, being mainly blue.

== See also ==
- Transport in Switzerland
- List of bus operating companies in Switzerland
