= Rottal Auto =

Swiss bus company

Rottal Auto AG is a company based in Ruswil, Switzerland which provides bus services in the Canton of Lucerne. The company operates commercial daytime services, as well as routes on the Nachstern network in the Luzern area, in conjunction with Verkehrsbetriebe Luzern.

== See also ==
- Verkehrsbetriebe Luzern
