= Tarifverbund Passepartout =

Tarifverbund Luzern/Obwalden/Nidwalden
- Founded: 1986; 39 years ago
- Headquarters: Lucerne, Switzerland
- Website: https://passepartout.ch/

The Tarifverbund Luzern/Obwalden/Nidwalden, also known by its marketing name Tarifverbund Passepartout, is a Swiss tariff network covering the cantons of Lucerne, Obwalden and Nidwalden in Central Switzerland.

The network offers various kinds of tickets, from single tickets to annual Season tickets, which are valid on the buses, ships and trains of the operators that are members of the network. Tickets are only valid within the Passepartout area, and prices are based on zones, with 29 zones covering the whole of the Passepartout area. In 2023, ca. 290.000 people had a seasonal card.

== History ==
The Tarifverbund Passepartout was founded in 1986 and offered cross-cantonal seasonal tickets from 1988. From 2002, single tickets for the so-called core zone around Lucerne were also introduced under the name Integraler Tarifverbund in der Agglomeration Luzern. From 13 December 2009, the single ticket service was extended to the entirety of the cantons of Lucerne, Obwalden and Nidwalden. This meant that zone tickets could now be purchased instead of the previously standard route tickets and the Tarifverbund Passepartout fare network became an integral fare network. At the same time, the management of the fare network was transferred to the newly founded Verkehrsverbund Luzern from 2010. The division of the network area into 78 zones for single tickets and 36 zones for season tickets, which was introduced in 2009, was replaced by a new zone map with 29 fare zones that apply to both ticket types as of the timetable change on 14 December 2014.

== Ticket range ==
In addition to the normal single tickets for certain zones, day tickets are also offered, which are valid for the respective day in these zones. There are also multi-journey tickets for both single tickets and day passes, which are intended for occasional users and are up to 10 per cent cheaper than single tickets.

All travelcards are available as annual or monthly travelcards on the Swisspass. In addition to the reduced “'Junior Travelcard”' for people under 25, there is also a special travelcard for dogs. There is also a 9-Uhr-Abo on offer, which is only valid from 9:00 a.m. on weekdays. For commuters travelling to other fare networks, there is also a special season ticket called the Modul-Abo.

=== Pricing characteristics ===
Short-distance tickets are only available in zone 10 in the Lucerne agglomeration. These are valid for a journey of up to 6 bus stops.

For tickets that are only valid within zone 10, a separate fare applies, which is higher than in the other zones. Zone 10 is also counted as two zones if it is purchased in combination with other zones. For this reason, so-called long-distance tickets have been introduced on the outskirts of Zone 10, which are valid for a single journey on selected routes and cost as much as a ticket for 1 zone.

With the Tarifverbund Schwyz and the Tarifverbund A-Welle, three so-called overlapping zones have been created in which both Passepartout tickets and tickets from the other network are valid. These zones can only be purchased in combination with another zone.

== Partners ==
=== Train ===
- Zentralbahn
- Swiss Federal Railways
- BLS AG

=== Trolleybuses and buses ===
- Auto AG Rothenburg (including. Emmer Busbetriebe)
- Auto AG Schwyz
- PostBus Switzerland, Central Switzerland region
- Rottal Auto
- Verkehrsbetriebe Luzern
- Zugerland Verkehrsbetriebe (Buses Seetal-Freiamt)

=== Boat ===
- Lake Lucerne Navigation Company (only partially integrated: on the Lucerne - Hertenstein - Weggis - Vitznau route, season tickets are valid)

== Network maps ==
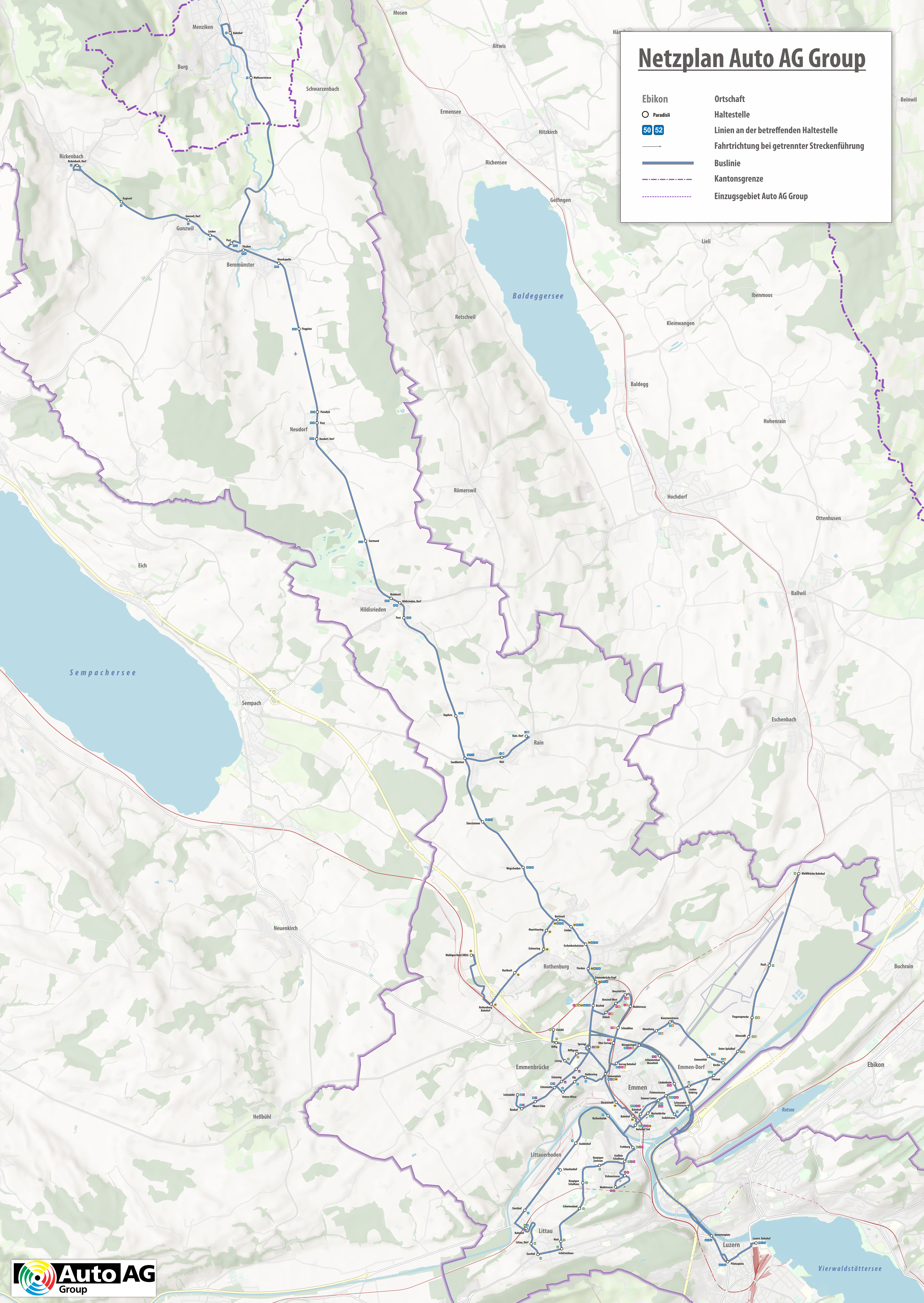
Rothenburg

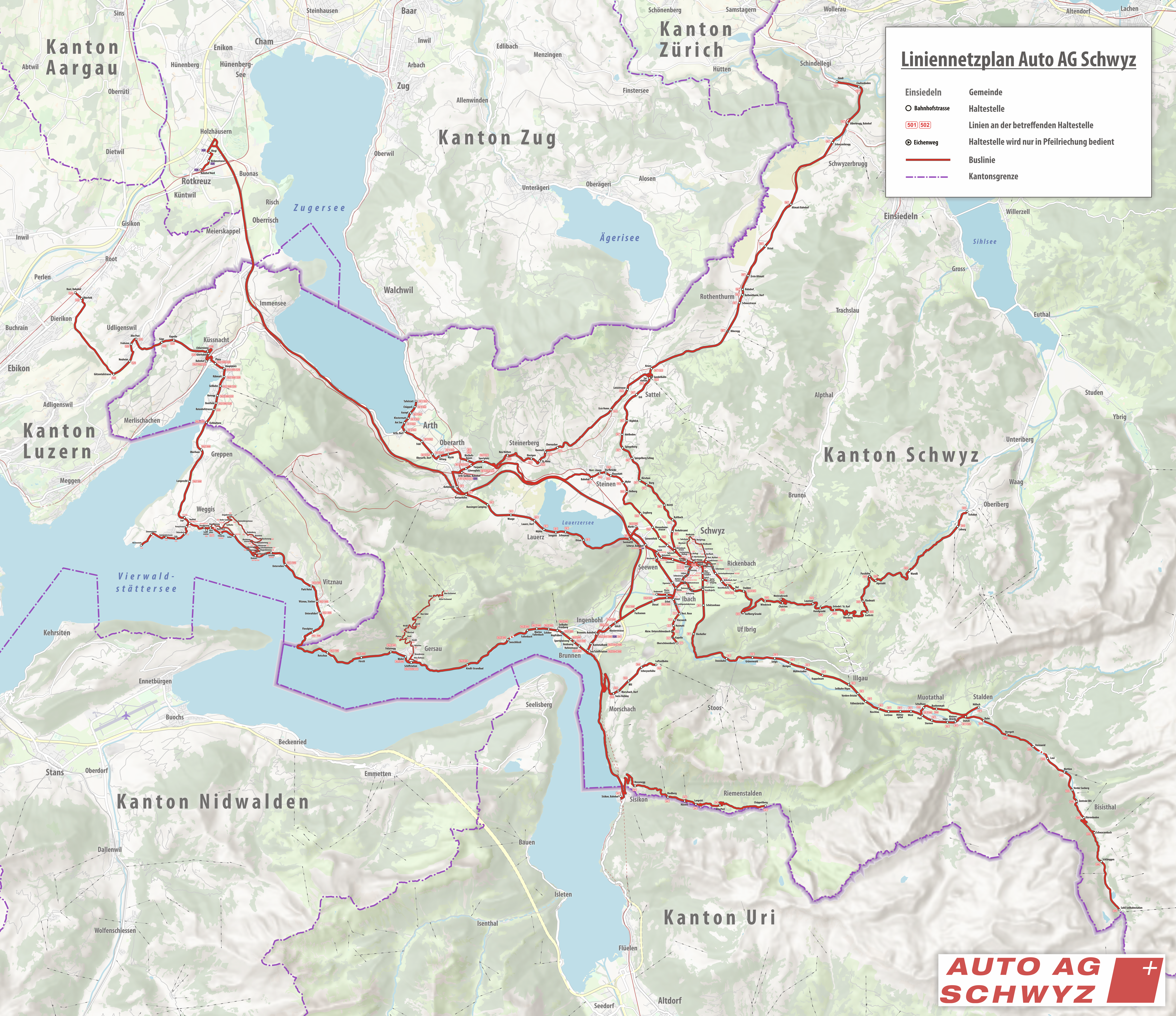
Canton of Schwyz

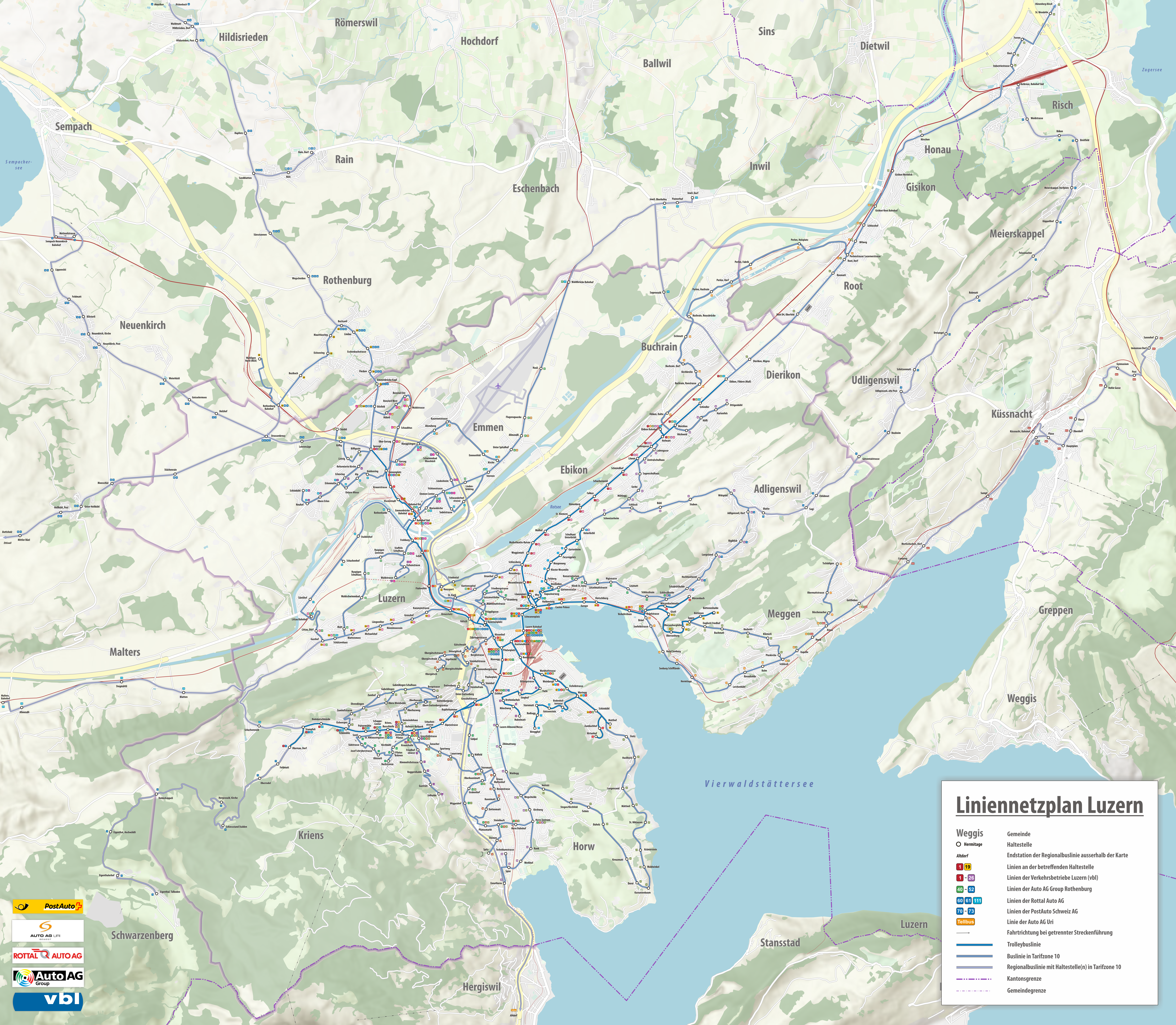
Lucerne

Luzern Entlebuch Escholzmatt

Luzern Hinterland

Luzern Hochdorf

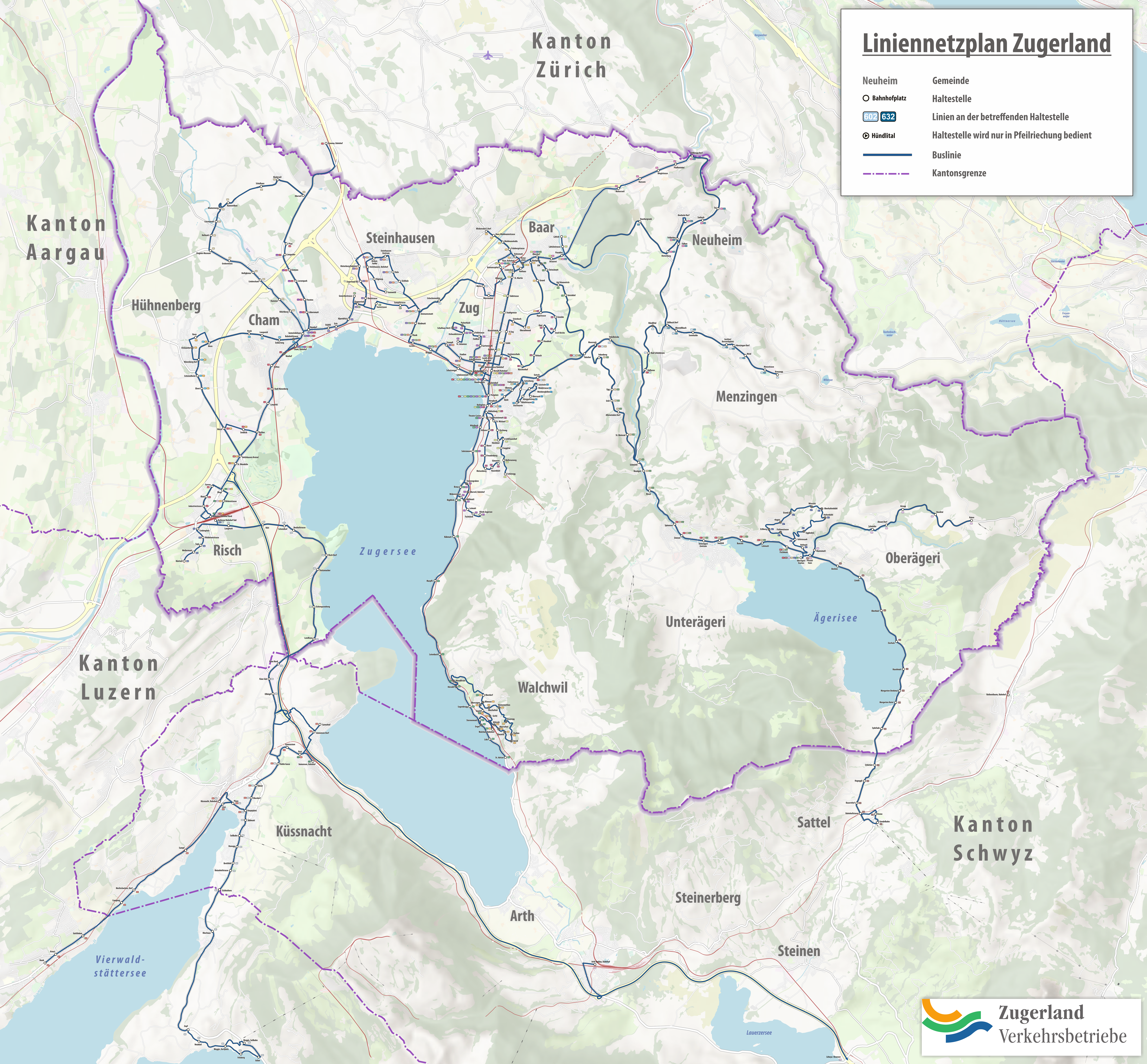
Canton of Zug

== See also ==
- List of Swiss tariff networks
- Lucerne S-Bahn
