= Ballwil railway station =

Swiss railway station

Ballwil
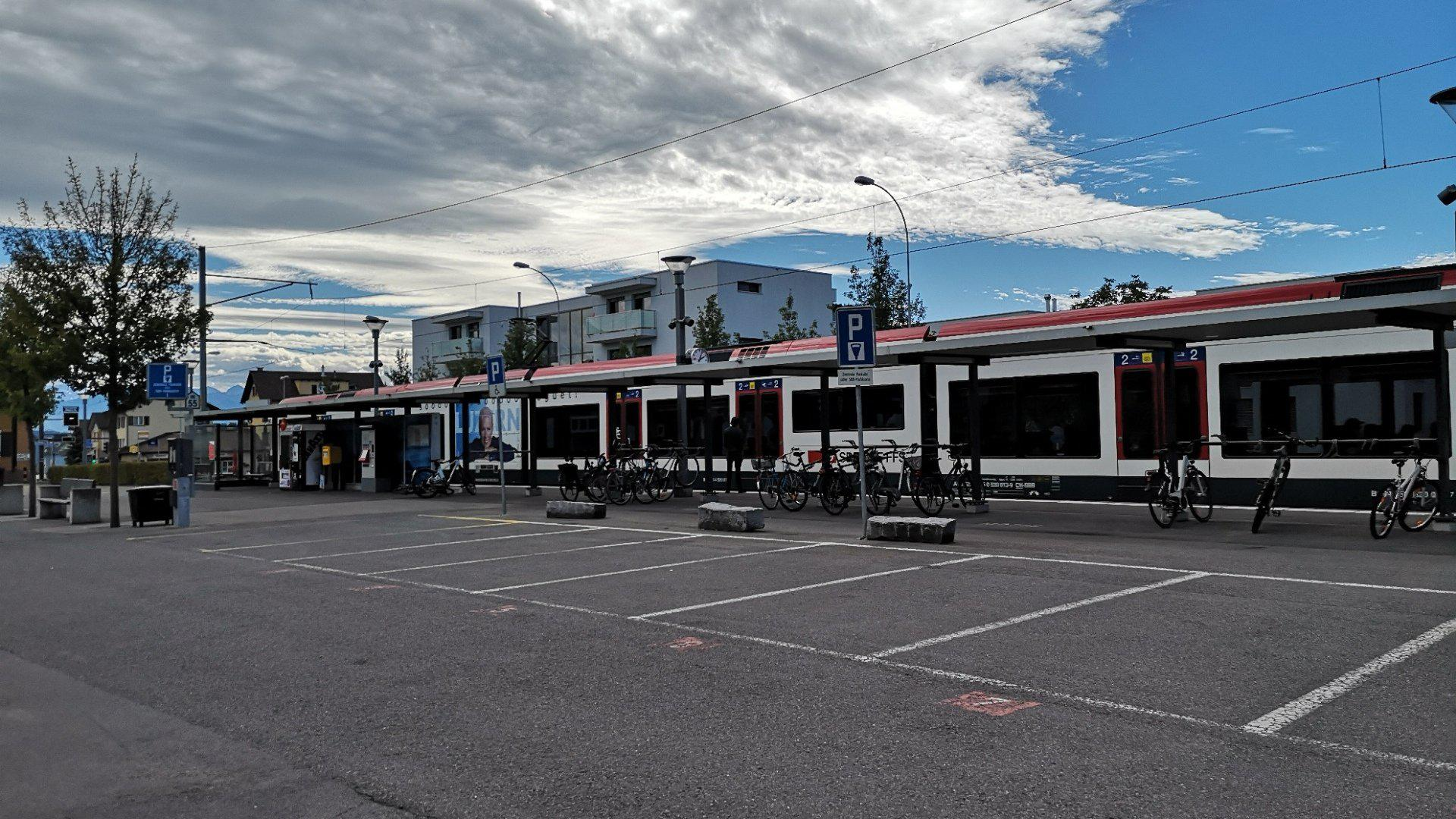
- An SBB train at the station in 2018

General information
- Location: Ballwil; Switzerland
- Coordinates: 47°09′14″N 8°19′01″E
- Owner: Swiss Federal Railways
- Line: Seetal line
- Train operators: Swiss Federal Railways

Services
Preceding station	Lucerne S-Bahn	Following station
Hochdorf Schönau towards Lenzburg	S9	Eschenbach towards Lucerne
Hochdorf Schönau towards Hochdorf	S99	Eschenbach towards Lucerne
Location
- Location within Switzerland Location within Canton of Lucerne

Ballwil railway station (German: Bahnhof Ballwil) is a railway station in the municipality of Ballwil, in the Swiss canton of Lucerne. It is an intermediate stop on the standard gauge Seetal line of Swiss Federal Railways.

== Services ==
The following services stop at Ballwil:

- Lucerne S-Bahn: S9/S99: half-hourly service between Lucerne and Lenzburg, with additional service at rush hour between Lucerne and Hochdorf.
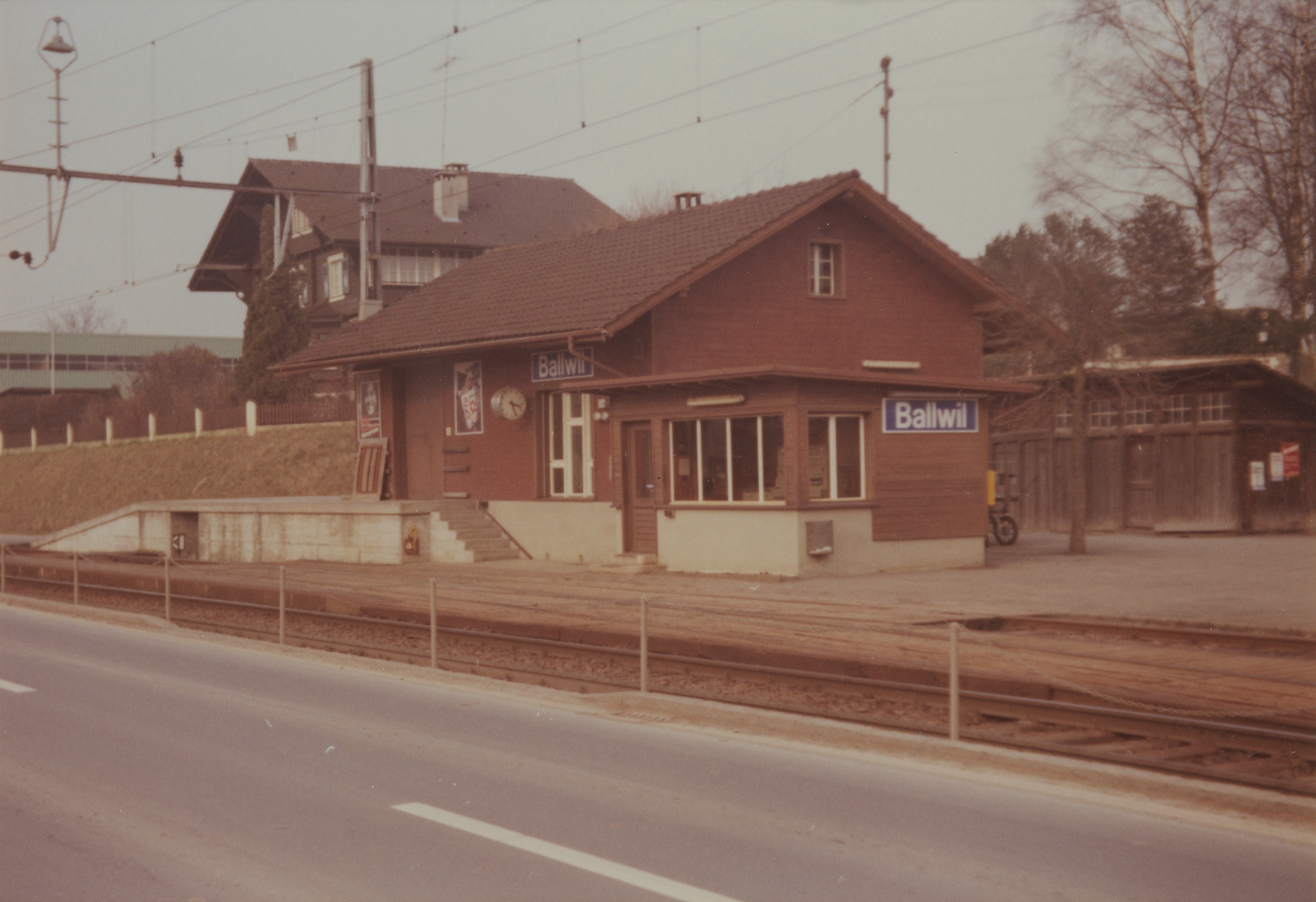
Station ca. 1977
