= Waldibrücke railway station =

Swiss railway station

Waldibrücke
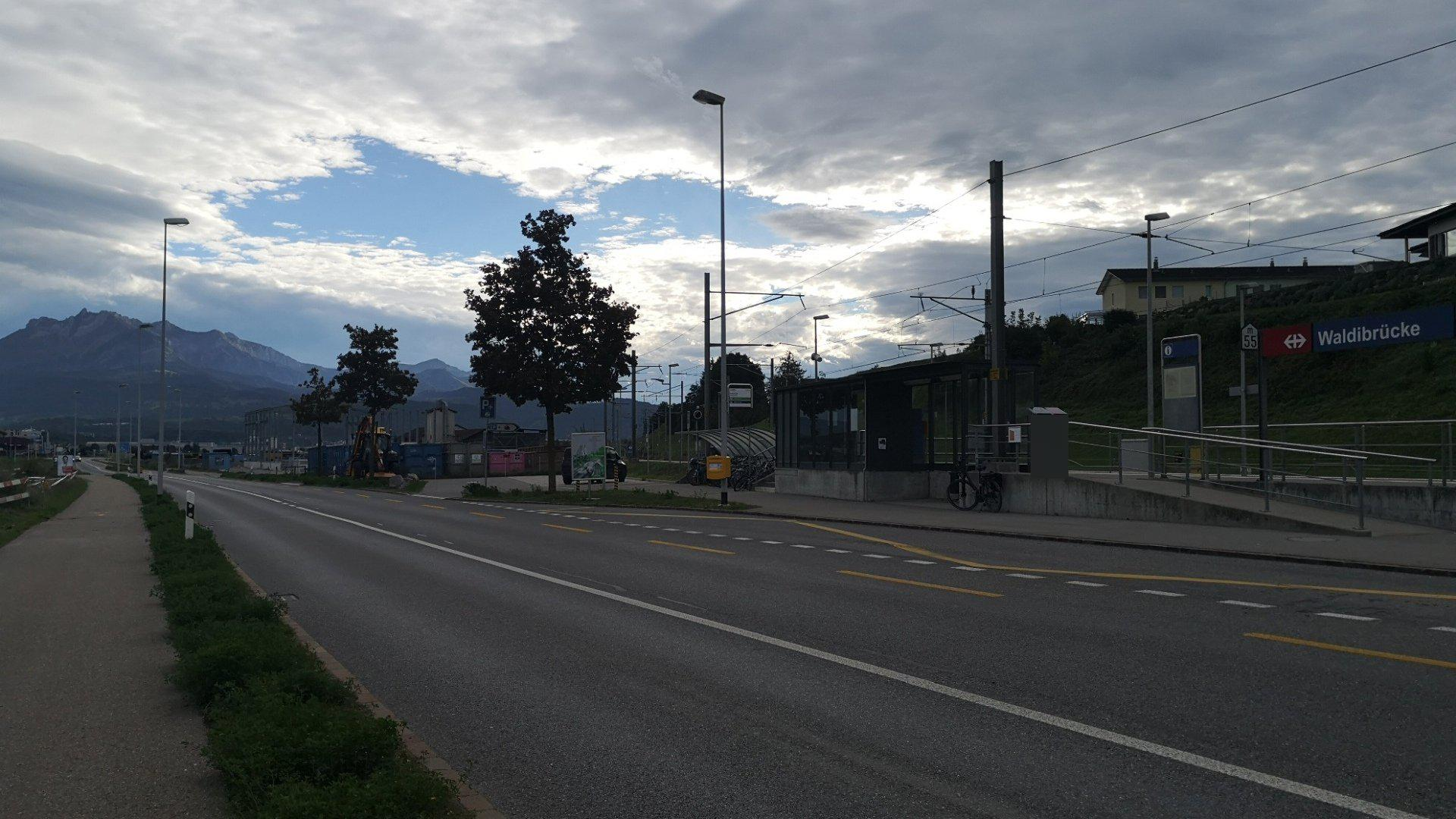
- The station in 2018

General information
- Location: Emmen; Switzerland
- Coordinates: 47°06′28″N 8°19′11″E
- Owner: Swiss Federal Railways
- Line: Seetal line
- Train operators: Swiss Federal Railways

Services
Preceding station	Lucerne S-Bahn	Following station
Eschenbach towards Lenzburg	S9	Emmenbrücke Gersag towards Lucerne
Eschenbach towards Hochdorf	S99	Emmenbrücke towards Lucerne
Location
- Location within Switzerland Location within Canton of Lucerne

Waldibrücke railway station (German: Bahnhof Waldibrücke) is a railway station in the municipality of Emmen, in the Swiss canton of Lucerne. It is an intermediate stop on the standard gauge Seetal line of Swiss Federal Railways.

== Services ==
The following services stop at Waldibrücke:

- Lucerne S-Bahn: S9/S99: half-hourly service between Lucerne and Lenzburg, with additional service at rush hour between Lucerne and Hochdorf.
