= Emmenbrücke railway station =

Railway station in Lucerne, Switzerland

Emmenbrücke
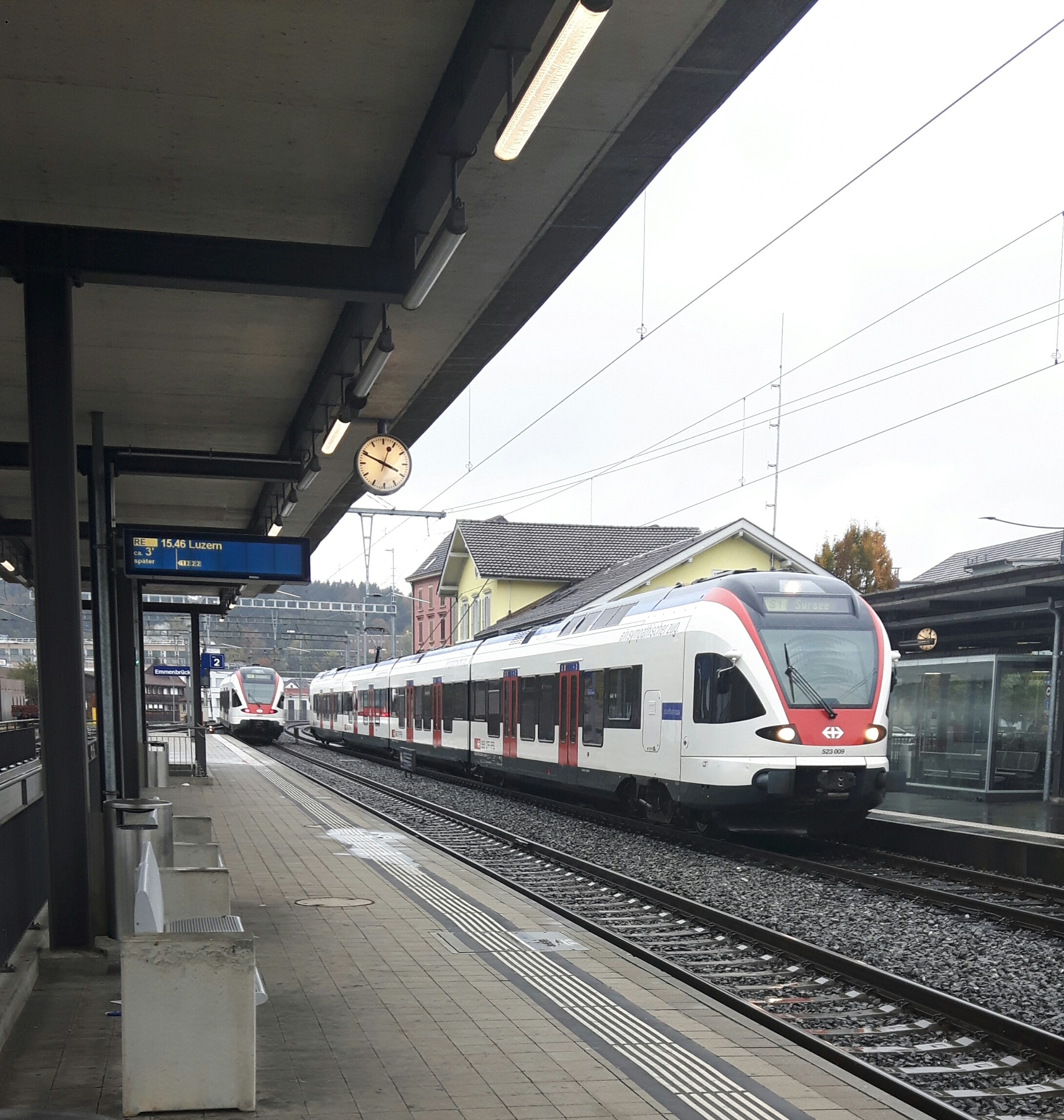
- SBB trains at the station in 2018

General information
- Location: Emmen; Switzerland
- Coordinates: 47°04′N 8°17′E
- Owner: Swiss Federal Railways
- Lines: Olten–Lucerne line; Seetal line
- Train operators: Swiss Federal Railways

Services
Preceding station	SBB CFF FFS	Following station
Rothenburg Station towards Olten	RE24	Lucerne Terminus
Preceding station	Lucerne S-Bahn	Following station
Emmenbrücke Gersag towards Lenzburg	S9	Lucerne Terminus
Waldibrücke towards Hochdorf	S99	Lucerne Terminus
Emmenbrücke Gersag towards Sursee	S1	Lucerne towards Baar
Location
- Location within Switzerland Location within Canton of Lucerne

Emmenbrücke railway station (German: Bahnhof Emmenbrücke) is a railway station in the municipality of Emmen, in the Swiss canton of Lucerne. It is an intermediate stop on the standard gauge Olten–Lucerne and Seetal lines of Swiss Federal Railways.

== Services ==
The following services stop at Emmenbrücke:

- RegioExpress: hourly service between Lucerne and Olten.
- Lucerne S-Bahn:
  - S1: half-hourly service between Sursee and Baar.
  - S9: half-hourly service between Lucerne and Lenzburg.
  - S99: rush-hour service between Lucerne and Hochdorf.
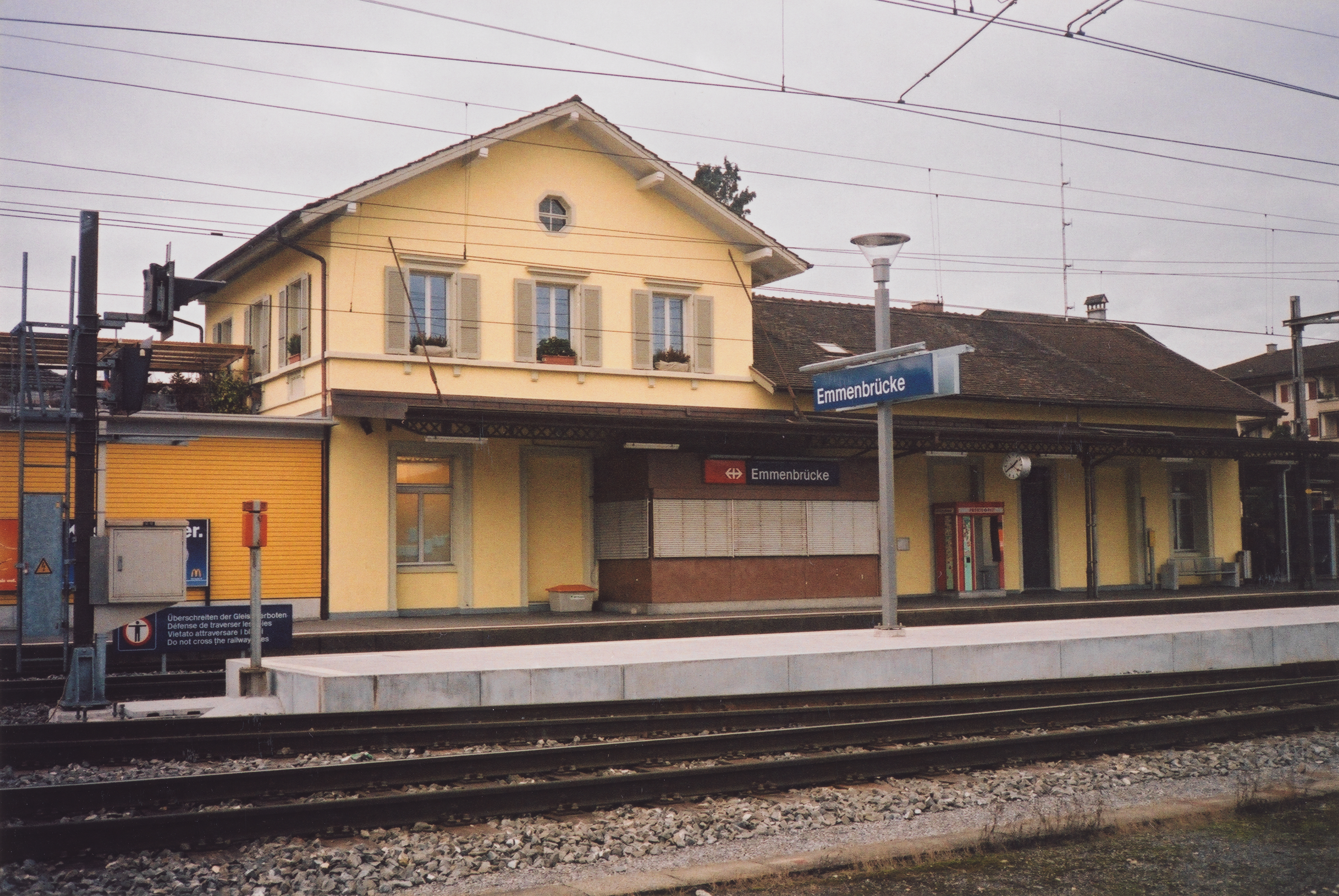
Station building in 2008

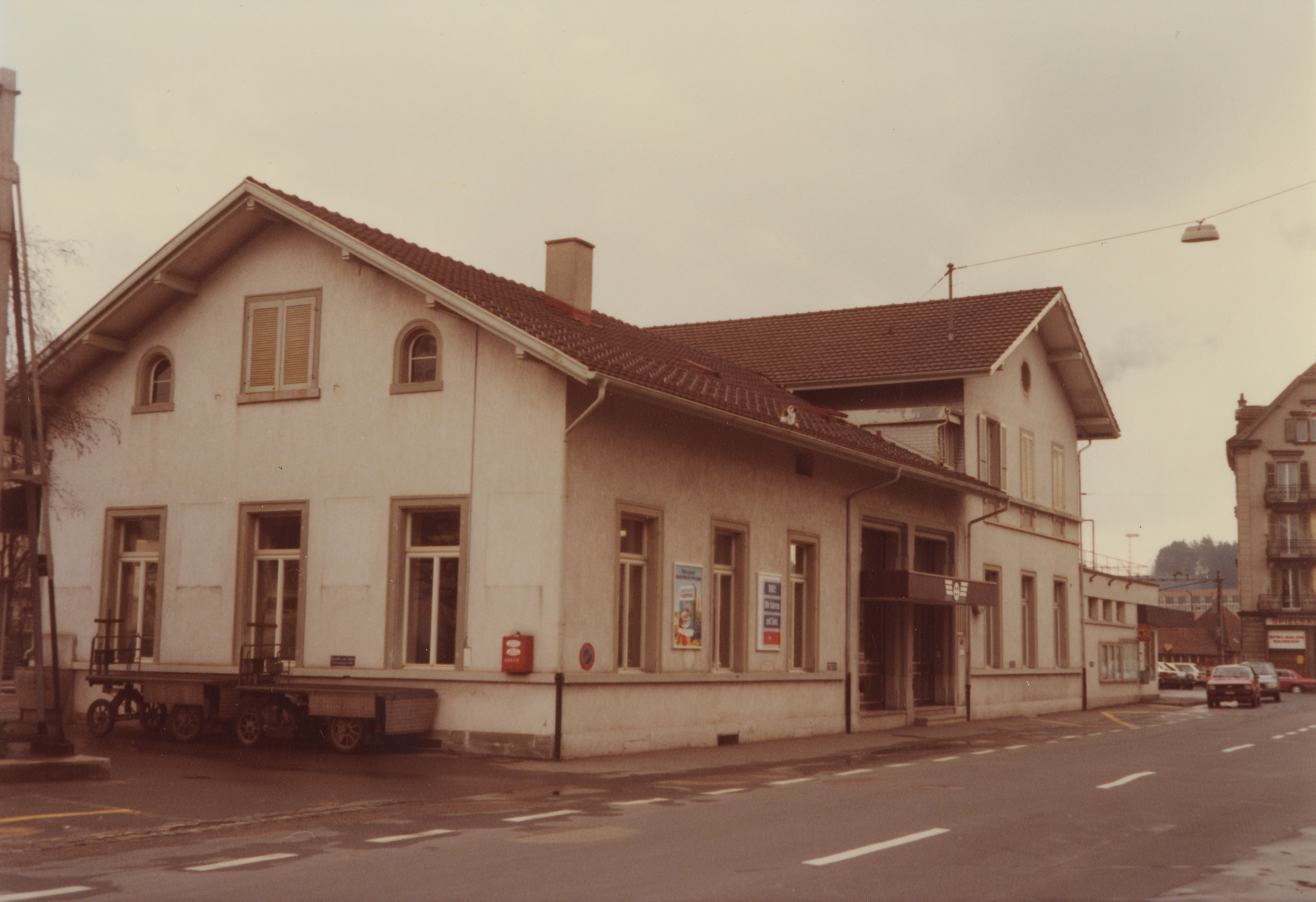
Station building in 1982
