= Eschenbach railway station =

Swiss railway station

Eschenbach
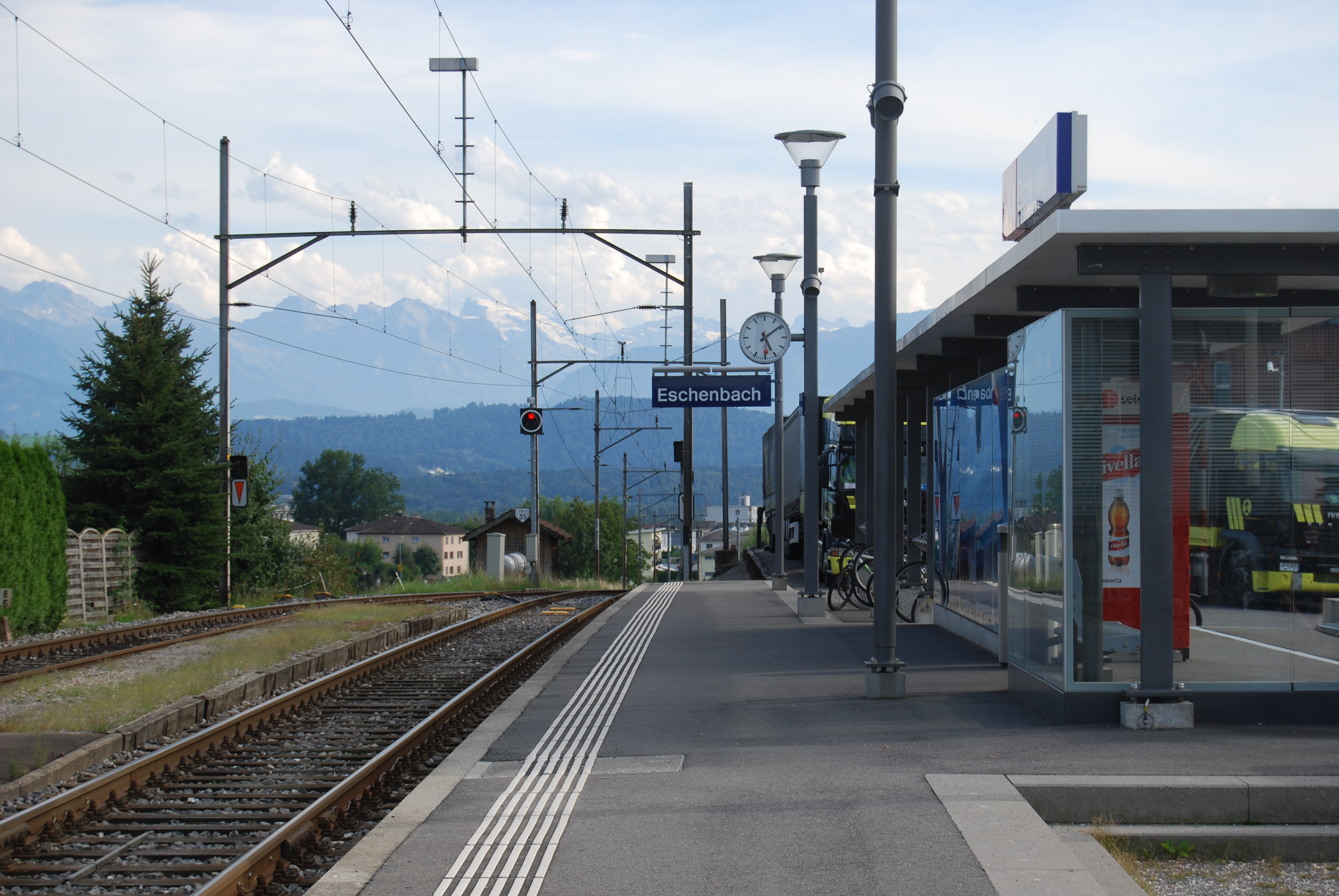
- The station platform in 2012

General information
- Location: Eschenbach; Switzerland
- Coordinates: 47°07′57″N 8°19′22″E
- Owner: Swiss Federal Railways
- Line: Seetal line
- Train operators: Swiss Federal Railways

Services
Preceding station	Lucerne S-Bahn	Following station
Ballwil towards Lenzburg	S9	Waldibrücke towards Lucerne
Ballwil towards Hochdorf	S99	Waldibrücke towards Lucerne
Location
- Location within Switzerland Location within Canton of Lucerne

Eschenbach railway station (German: Bahnhof Eschenbach) is a railway station in the municipality of Eschenbach, in the Swiss canton of Lucerne. It is an intermediate stop on the standard gauge Seetal line of Swiss Federal Railways.

== Services ==
The following services stop at Eschenbach:

- Lucerne S-Bahn: S9/S99: half-hourly service between Lucerne and Lenzburg, with additional service at rush hour between Lucerne and Hochdorf.
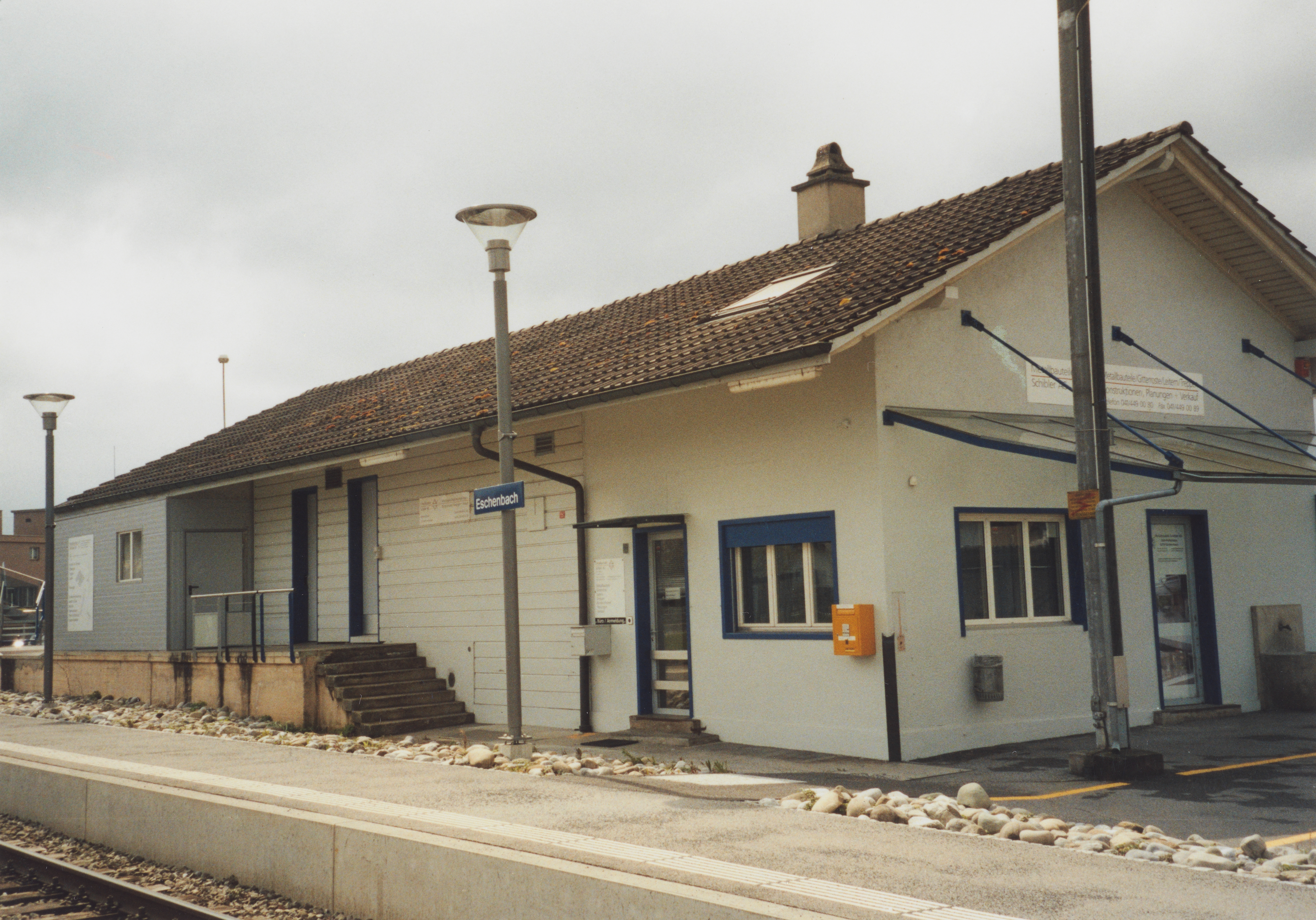
Station in 2007

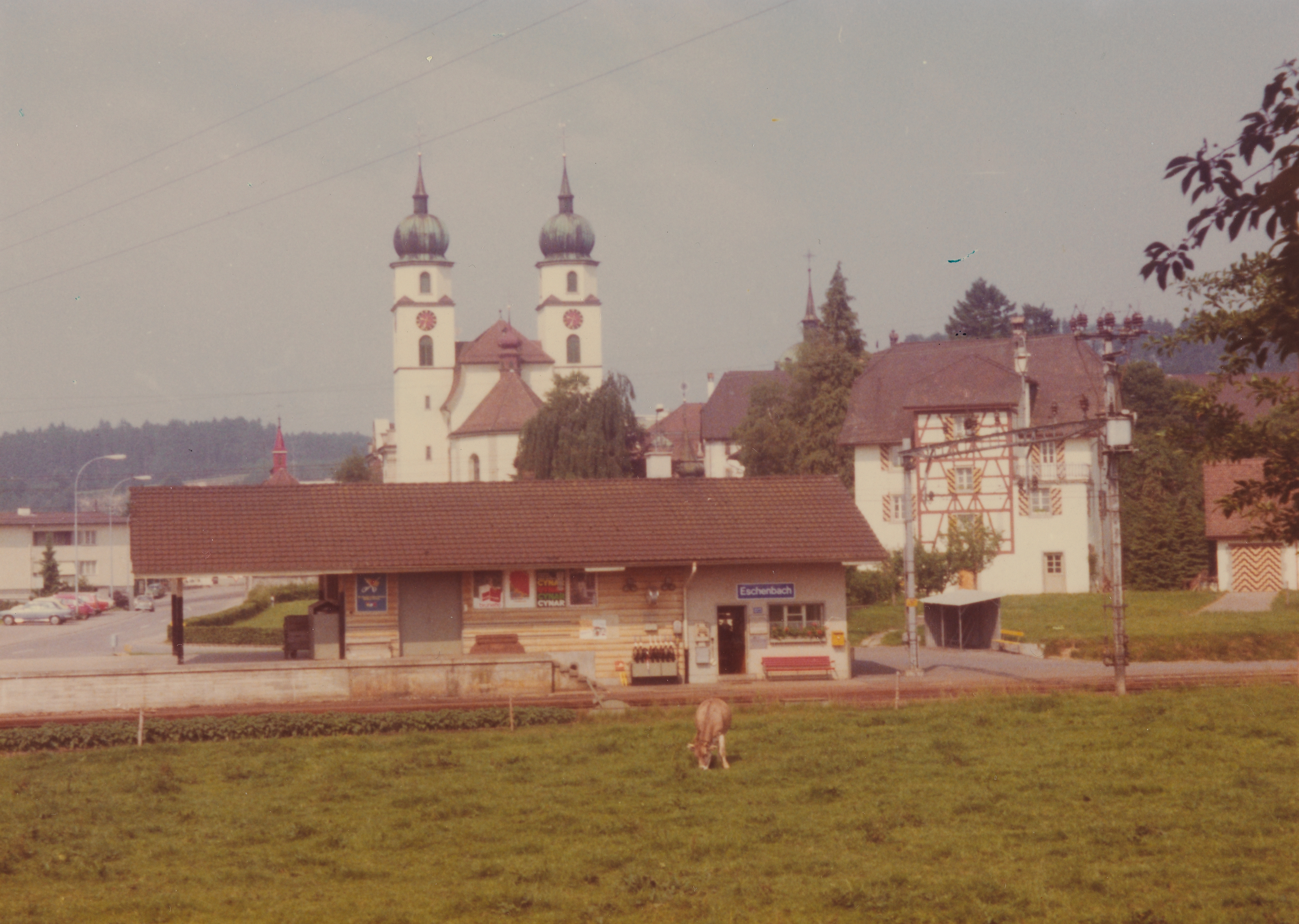
Station in 1976
