= Emmenbrücke Gersag railway station =

Swiss railway station

Emmenbrücke Gersag
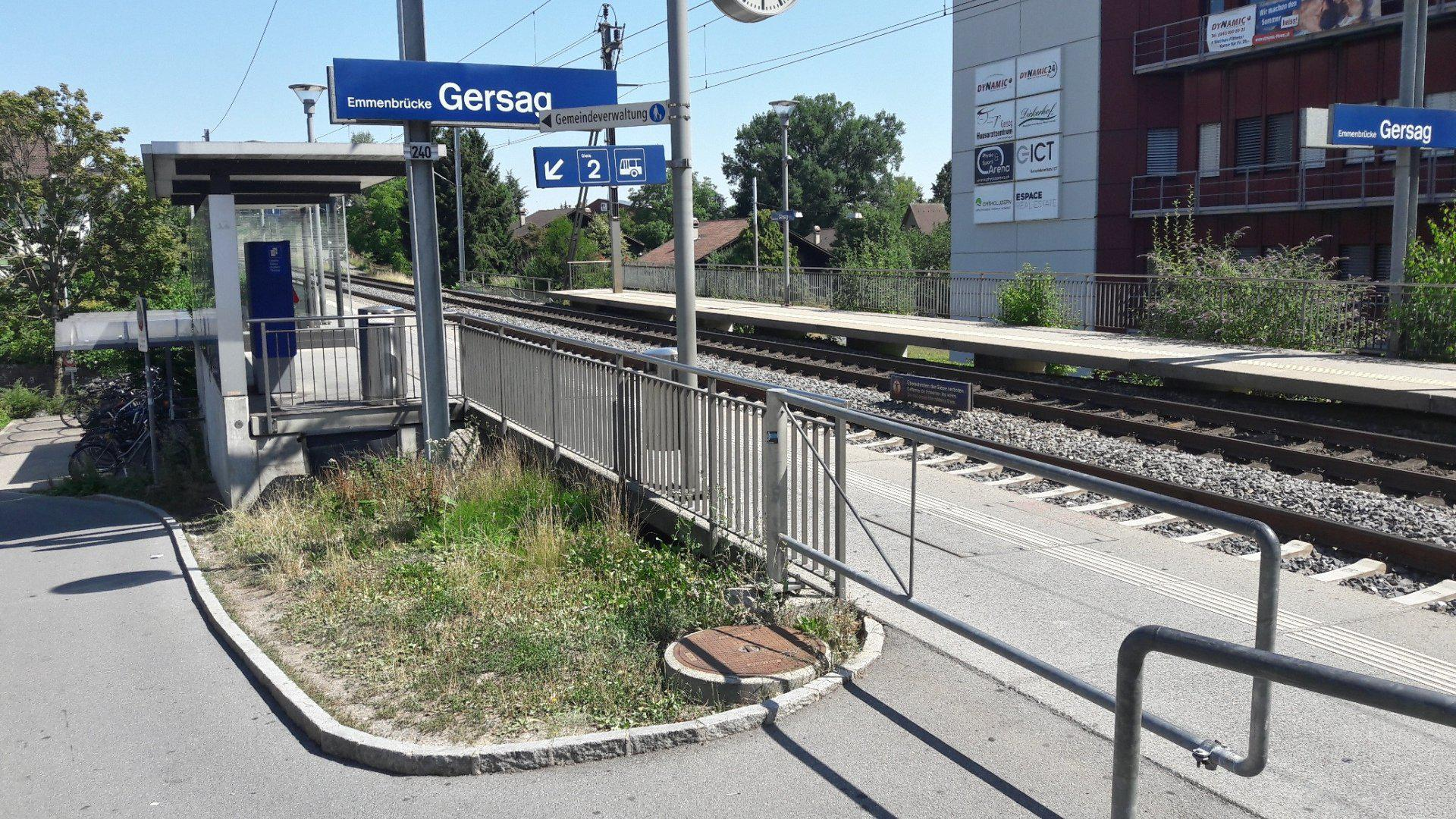
- The station in 2018

General information
- Location: Emmen; Switzerland
- Coordinates: 47°04′42″N 8°16′36″E
- Owner: Swiss Federal Railways
- Lines: Olten–Lucerne line; Seetal line
- Train operators: Swiss Federal Railways

Services
Preceding station	Lucerne S-Bahn	Following station
Waldibrücke towards Lenzburg	S9	Emmenbrücke towards Lucerne
Emmenbrücke Kapf towards Sursee	S1	Emmenbrücke towards Baar
Location
- Location within Switzerland Location within Canton of Lucerne

Emmenbrücke Gersag railway station (German: Bahnhof Emmenbrücke Gersag) is a railway station in the municipality of Emmen, in the Swiss canton of Lucerne. It is located at the junction of the standard gauge Olten–Lucerne and Seetal lines of Swiss Federal Railways.

== Services ==
The following services stop at Emmenbrücke Gersag:

- Lucerne S-Bahn
  - S1: half-hourly service between Sursee and Baar.
  - S9: half-hourly service between Lucerne and Lenzburg.
