= Gelfingen railway station =

Swiss railway station

Gelfingen
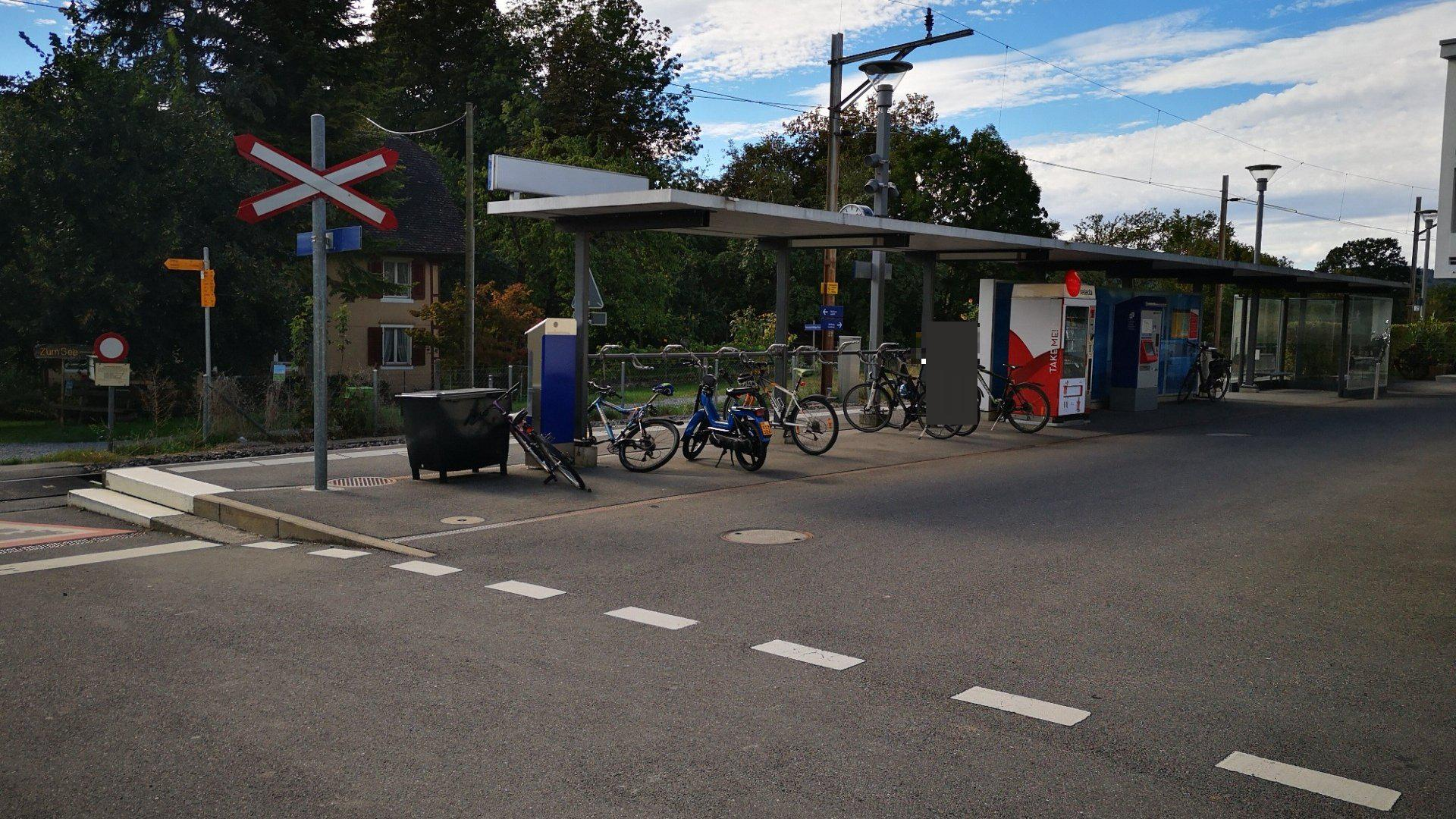
- The station platform in 2018

General information
- Location: Hitzkirch; Switzerland
- Coordinates: 47°12′49″N 8°15′54″E
- Owner: Swiss Federal Railways
- Line: Seetal line
- Train operators: Swiss Federal Railways

Services
Preceding station	Lucerne S-Bahn	Following station
Hitzkirch towards Lenzburg	S9	Baldegg towards Lucerne
Location
- Location within Switzerland Location within Canton of Lucerne

Gelfingen railway station (German: Bahnhof Gelfingen) is a railway station in the municipality of Hitzkirch, in the Swiss canton of Lucerne. It is an intermediate stop on the standard gauge Seetal line of Swiss Federal Railways.

== Services ==
The following services stop at Gelfingen:

- Lucerne S-Bahn S9: half-hourly service between Lucerne and Lenzburg.
