= Baldegg Kloster railway station =

Swiss railway station

Baldegg Kloster
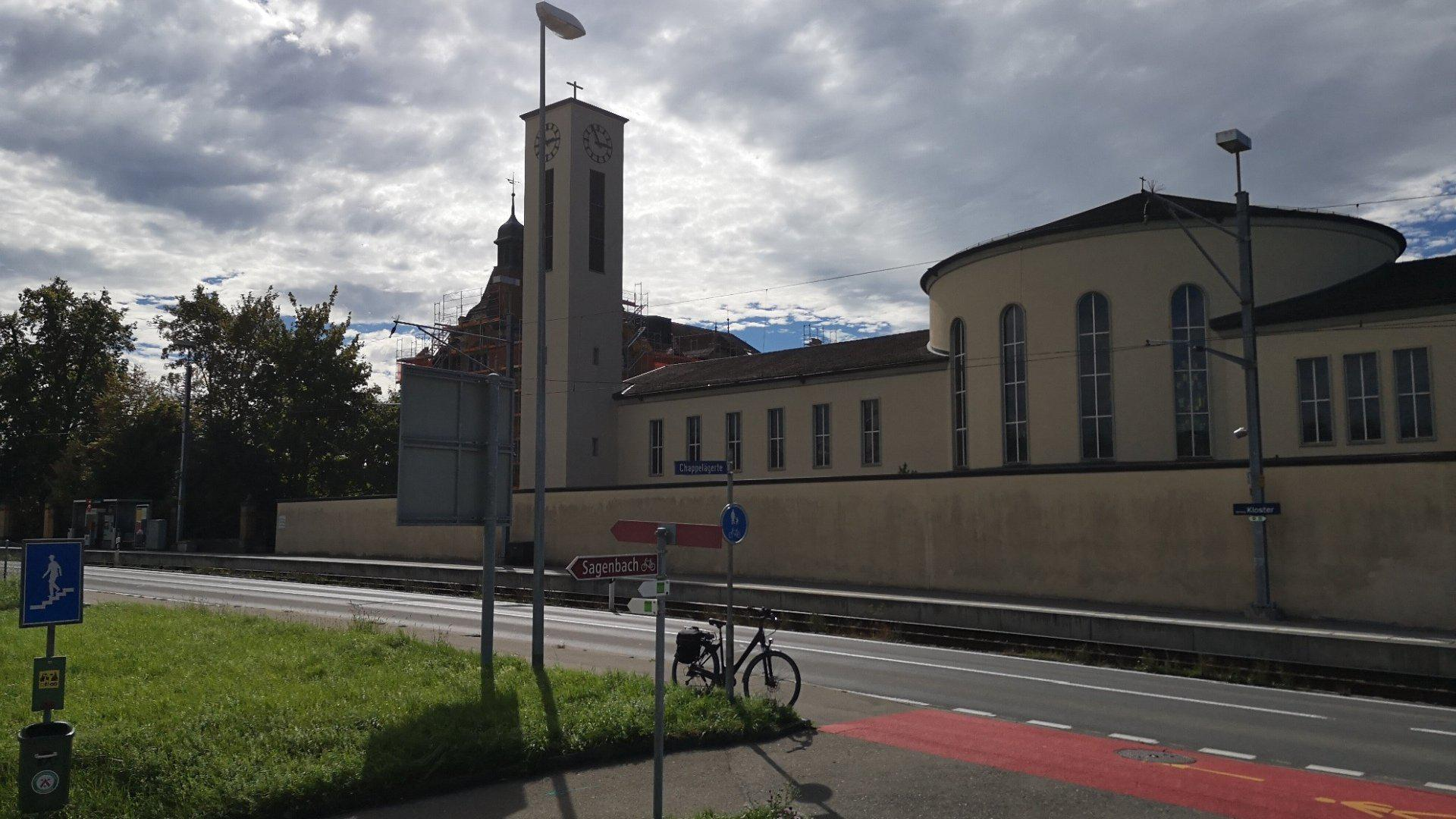
- The station platform in 2018

General information
- Location: Hochdorf; Switzerland
- Coordinates: 47°10′50″N 8°16′50″E
- Owner: Swiss Federal Railways
- Line: Seetal line
- Train operators: Swiss Federal Railways

Services
Preceding station	Lucerne S-Bahn	Following station
Baldegg towards Lenzburg	S9	Hochdorf towards Lucerne
Location
- Location within Switzerland Location within Canton of Lucerne

Baldegg Kloster railway station (German: Bahnhof Baldegg Kloster) is a railway station in the municipality of Hochdorf, in the Swiss canton of Lucerne. It is an intermediate stop on the standard gauge Seetal line of Swiss Federal Railways.

== Services ==
The following services stop at Baldegg Kloster:

- Lucerne S-Bahn S9: half-hourly service between Lucerne and Lenzburg.
