= Hochdorf Schönau railway station =

Swiss railway station

Hochdorf Schönau
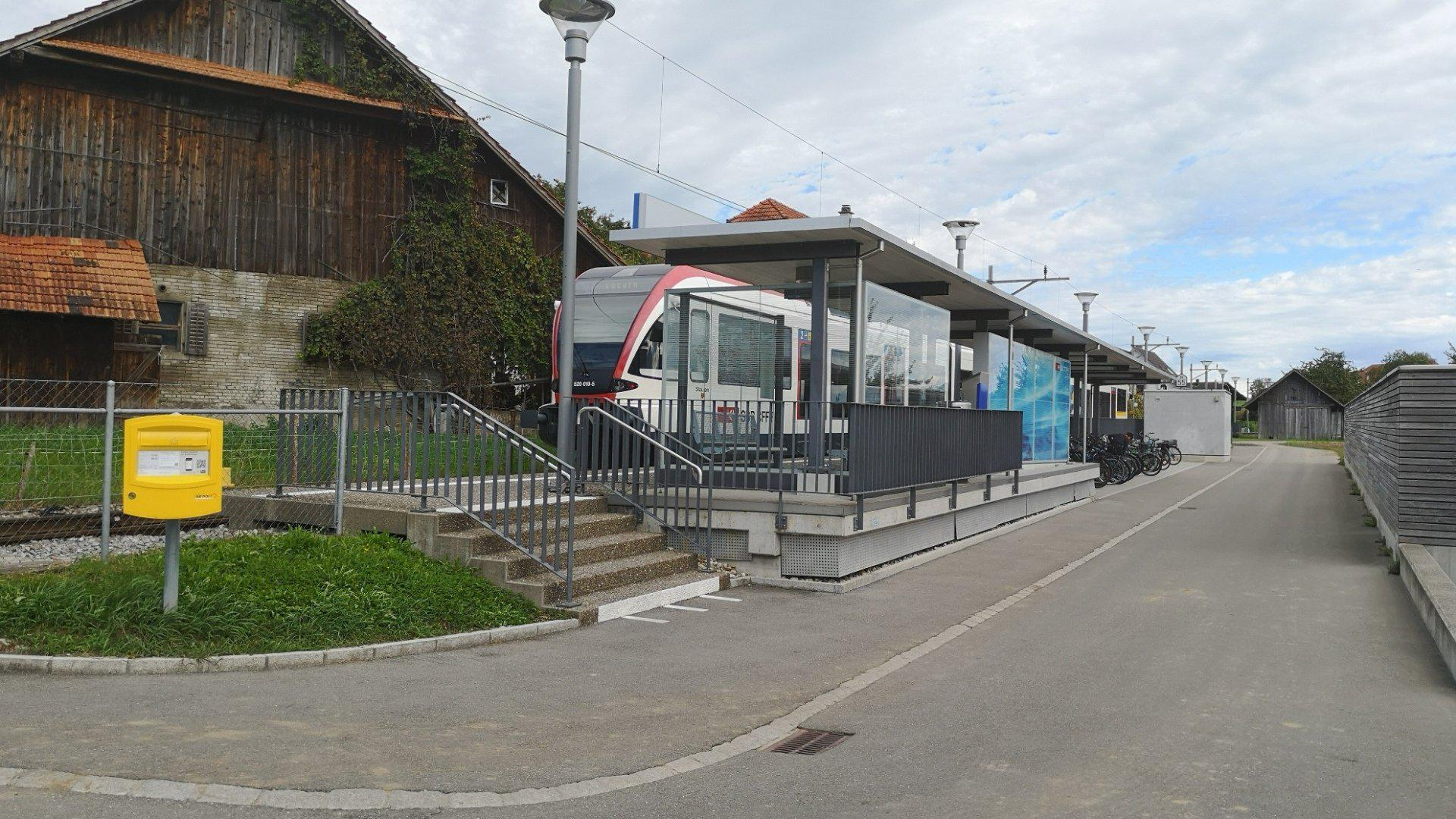
- An SBB train at the station in 2018

General information
- Location: Hochdorf; Switzerland
- Coordinates: 47°09′53″N 8°17′54″E
- Owner: Swiss Federal Railways
- Line: Seetal line
- Train operators: Swiss Federal Railways

Services
Preceding station	Lucerne S-Bahn	Following station
Hochdorf towards Lenzburg	S9	Ballwil towards Lucerne
Hochdorf Terminus	S99	Ballwil towards Lucerne
Location
- Location within Switzerland Location within Canton of Lucerne

Hochdorf Schönau railway station (German: Bahnhof Hochdorf Schönau) is a railway station in the municipality of Hochdorf, in the Swiss canton of Lucerne. It is an intermediate stop on the standard gauge Seetal line of Swiss Federal Railways.

== Services ==
The following services stop at Hochdorf Schönau:

- Lucerne S-Bahn: S9/S99: half-hourly service between Lucerne and Lenzburg, with additional service at rush hour between Lucerne and Hochdorf.
