= Lenzburg Stadt railway station =

Swiss railway station

Lenzburg Stadt
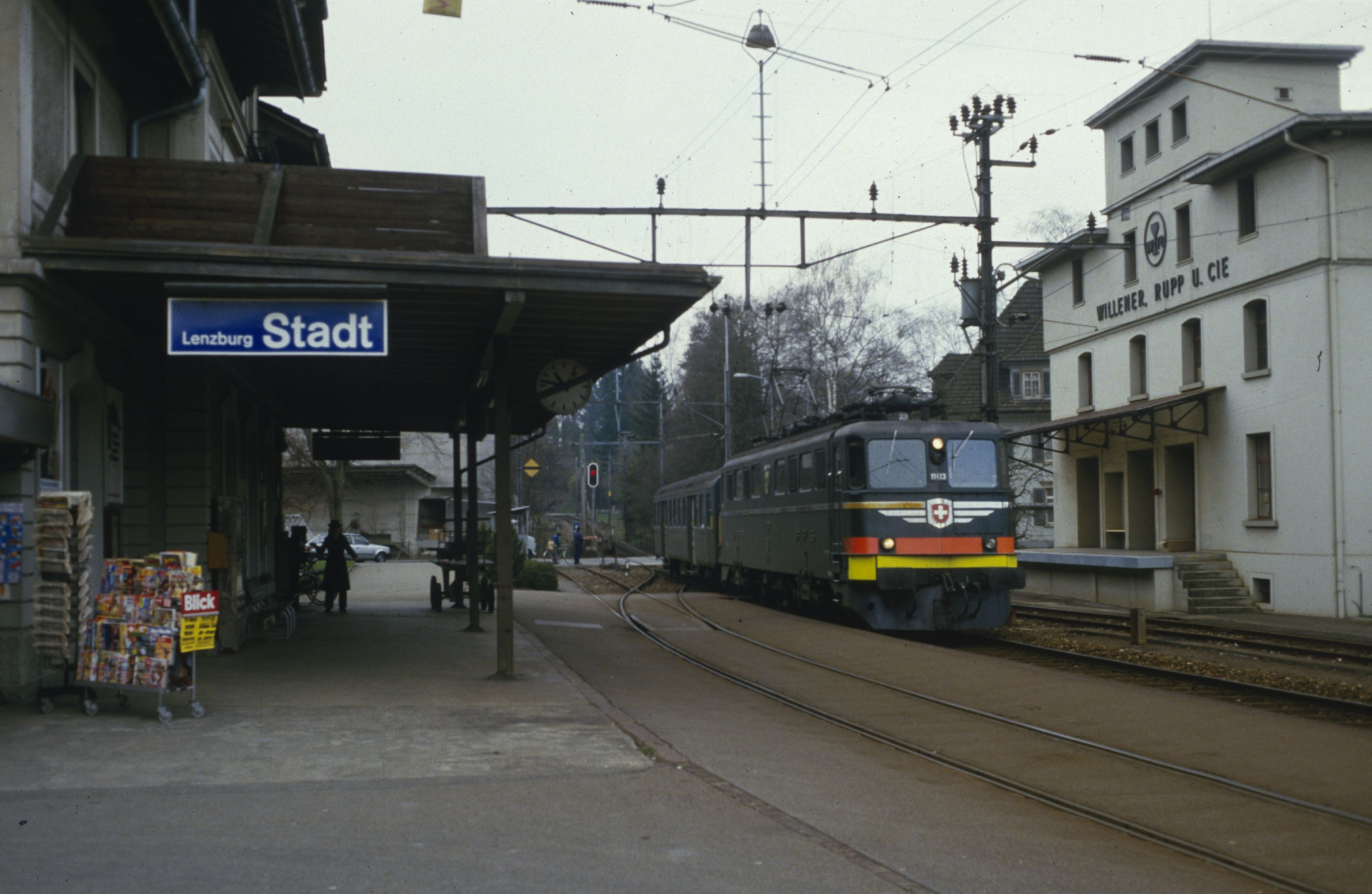
- The station in April 1984

General information
- Location: Bahnhofstrasse 4 / Seetalplatz / Malagarain; Lenzburg; Switzerland
- Coordinates: 47.38867°N 8.17794°E
- Elevation: 397 m (1,302 ft)
- Owner: Swiss Federal Railways (1922-2005), Schweizerische Seethalbahn (1895-1922)
- Line: Seetal line
- Tracks: 2
- Train operators: Swiss Federal Railways

Construction
- Architect: Emil Vogt (1895)

History
- Opened: 1 October 1895
- Closed: 2 June 1984 (passenger), 31 March 2005 (cargo)
- Electrified: 1910
Location
- Location within Switzerland Location within Canton of Aargau

Lenzburg Stadt railway station (German: Bahnhof Lenzburg Stadt) was a railway station in Lenzburg in the Swiss canton of Aargau. It was located at the station square (German: Seetalplatz) in Bahnhofstrasse.

The station was opened in 1895 by Schweizerische Seethalbahn Aktiengesellschaft, on the Seetal line to Wildegg. The station building by Emil Vogt had a small restaurant. By 1910, the line was electrified. The station (and line) were nationalized by Swiss Federal Railways in 1922. The present-day Malagarain street is built on some of the right of way.

Trains from Lenzburg Stadt to Lenzburg had to reverse at "Lenzburg Spitzkehre". Towards Wildegg, the line passed through a small, now pedestrian, tunnel in the railway embankment.

== Closure ==
With the opening of the Heitersberg railway line in 1975, service from Lenzburg station further improved and Lenzburg Stadt was less used. Passenger service ended on 2 June 1984 and installations were gradually dismantled. The station building was destroyed in 2003. Cargo traffic continued to spring 2005 for UFA AG, a Fenaco subsidiary, who opposed the closure of the line.

After the tracks were removed, a covered bypass road (Kerntangente) was built on the land. The (former) building remained in the canton's building inventory until 2017. A house across the tracks of the former station still exists in 2021.

== Gallery ==
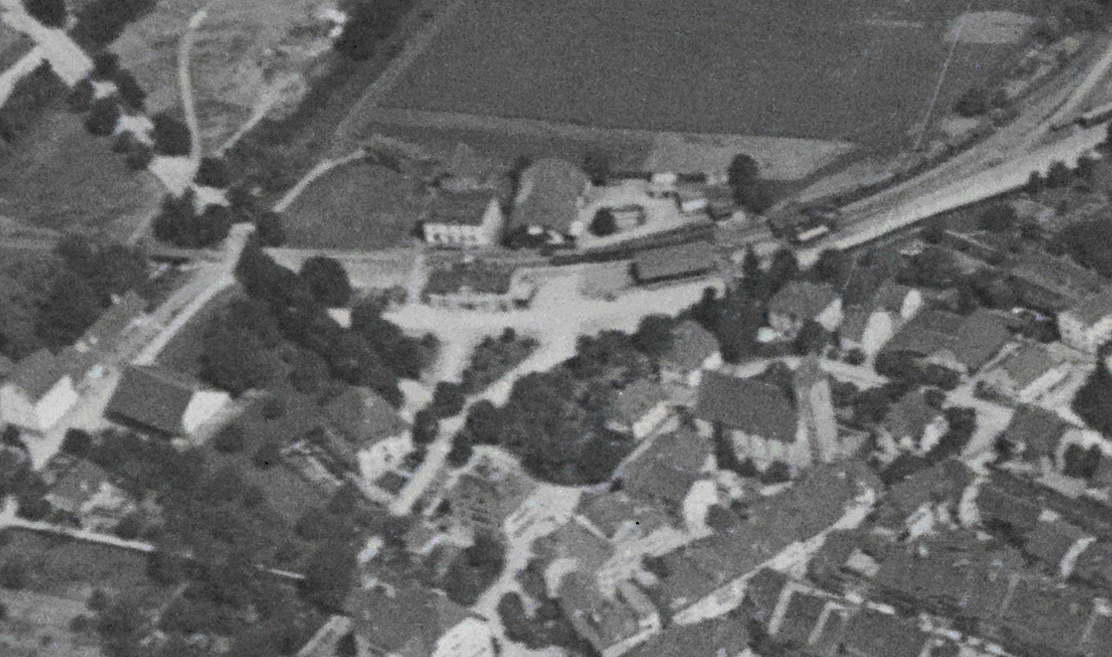
Aerial view with Bahnhofstrasse in the top left corner, 1919

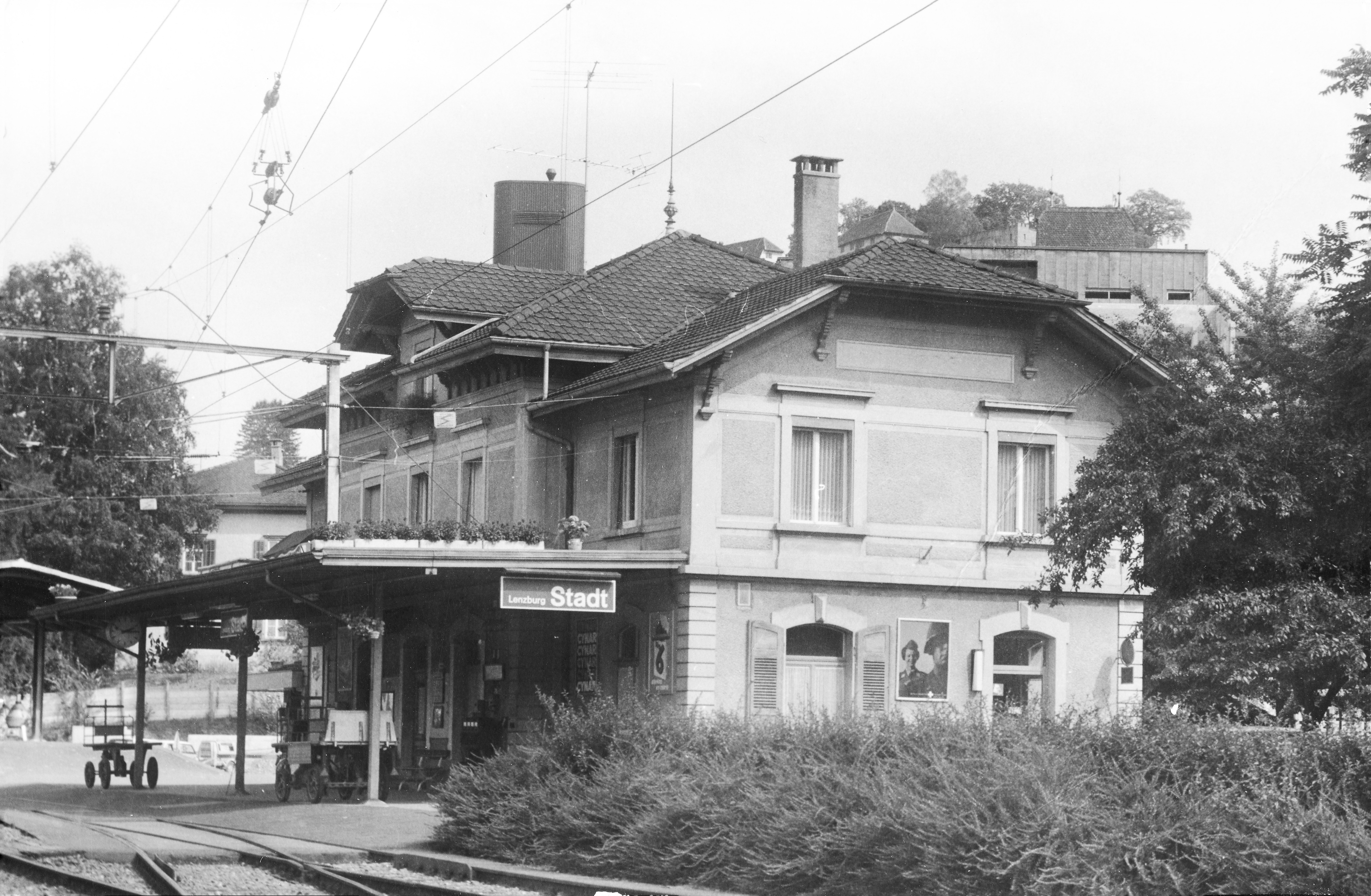
The station building in 1974

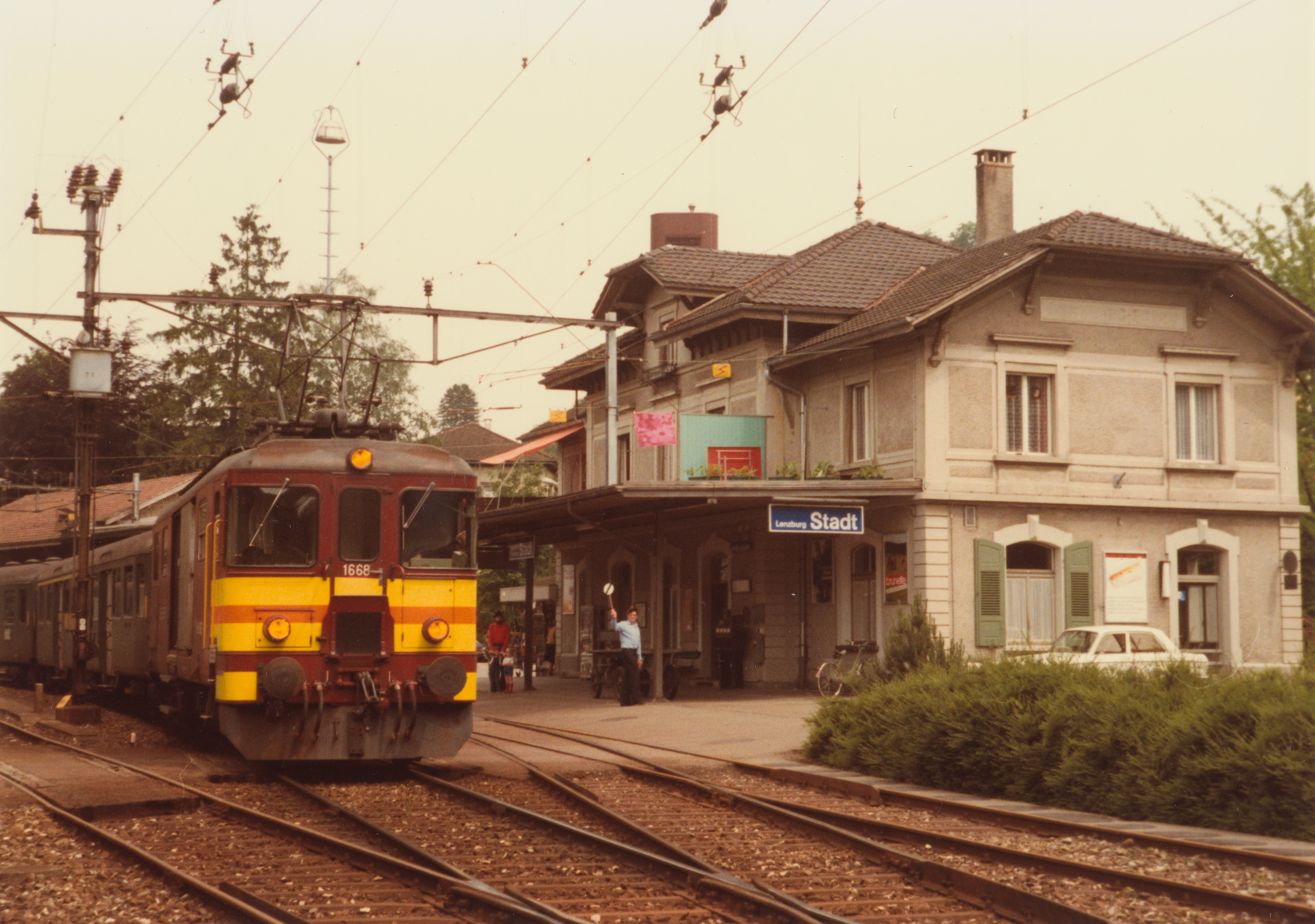
Station with passenger train (likely before June 1984)

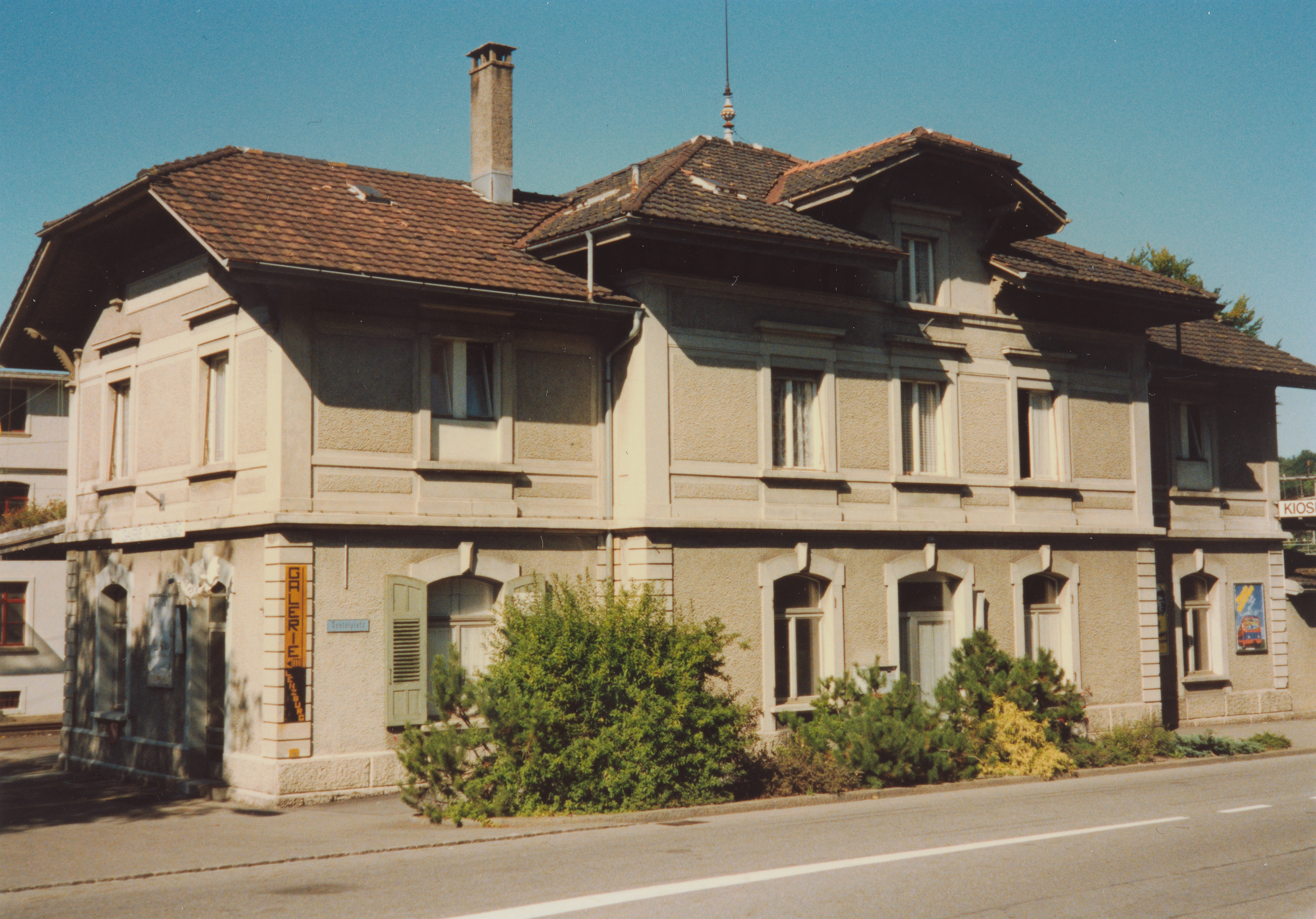
Seetalplatz side (ca. 1990)

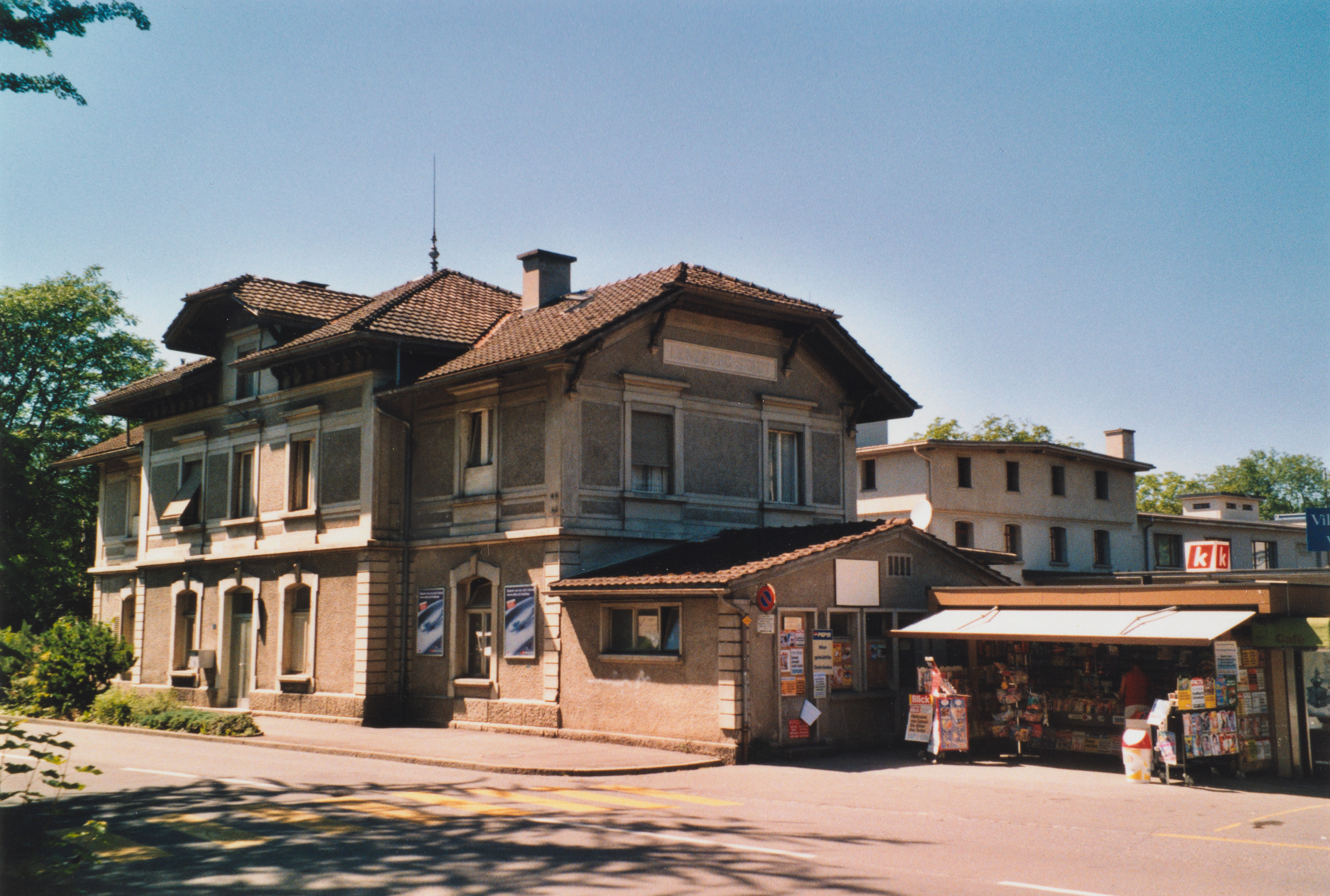
Former station building in 2001 (demolished in 2003)

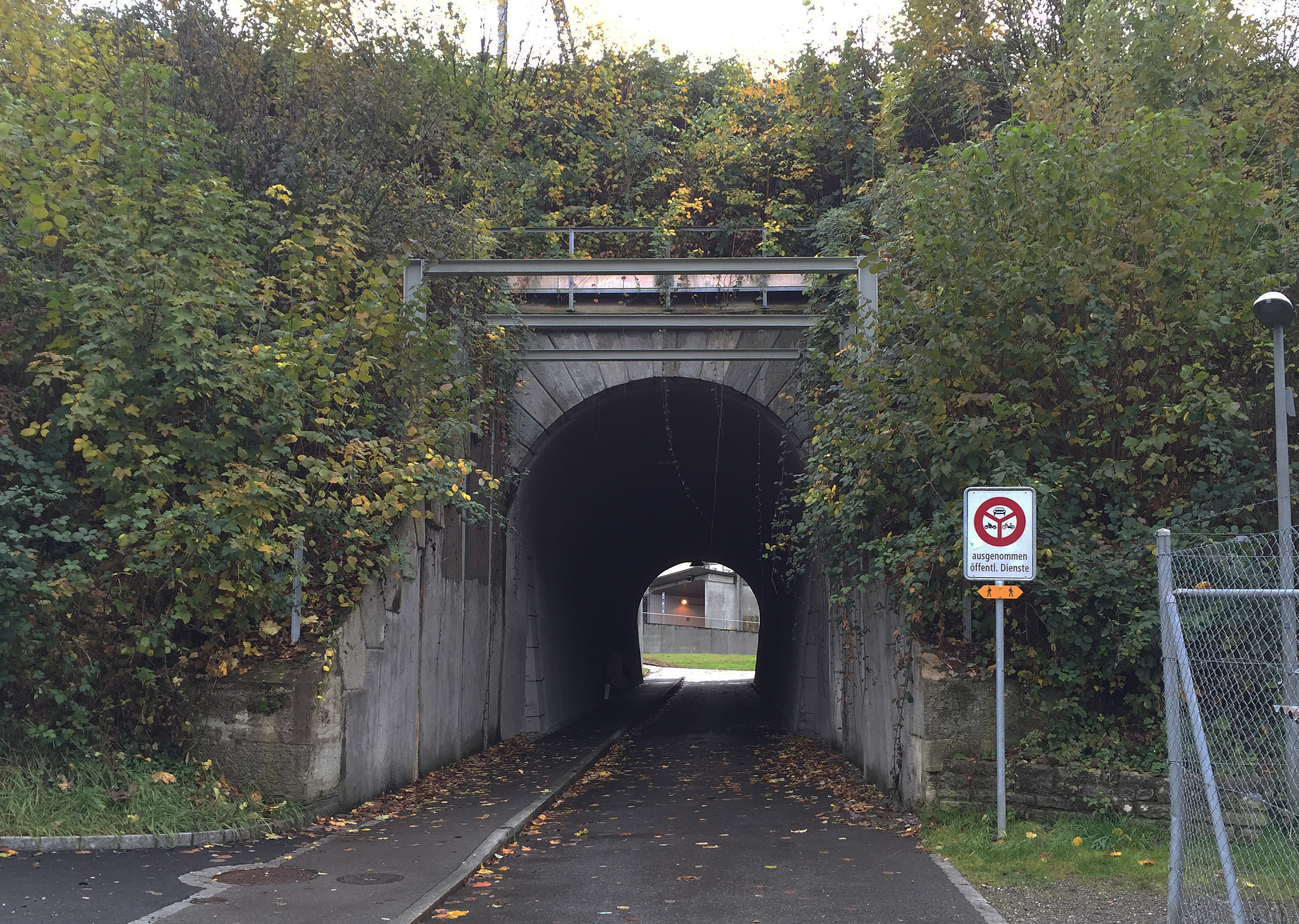
former Seetalbahn tunnel near the station (2016)
