= Emmenbrücke Kapf railway station =

Swiss railway station

Emmenbrücke Kapf
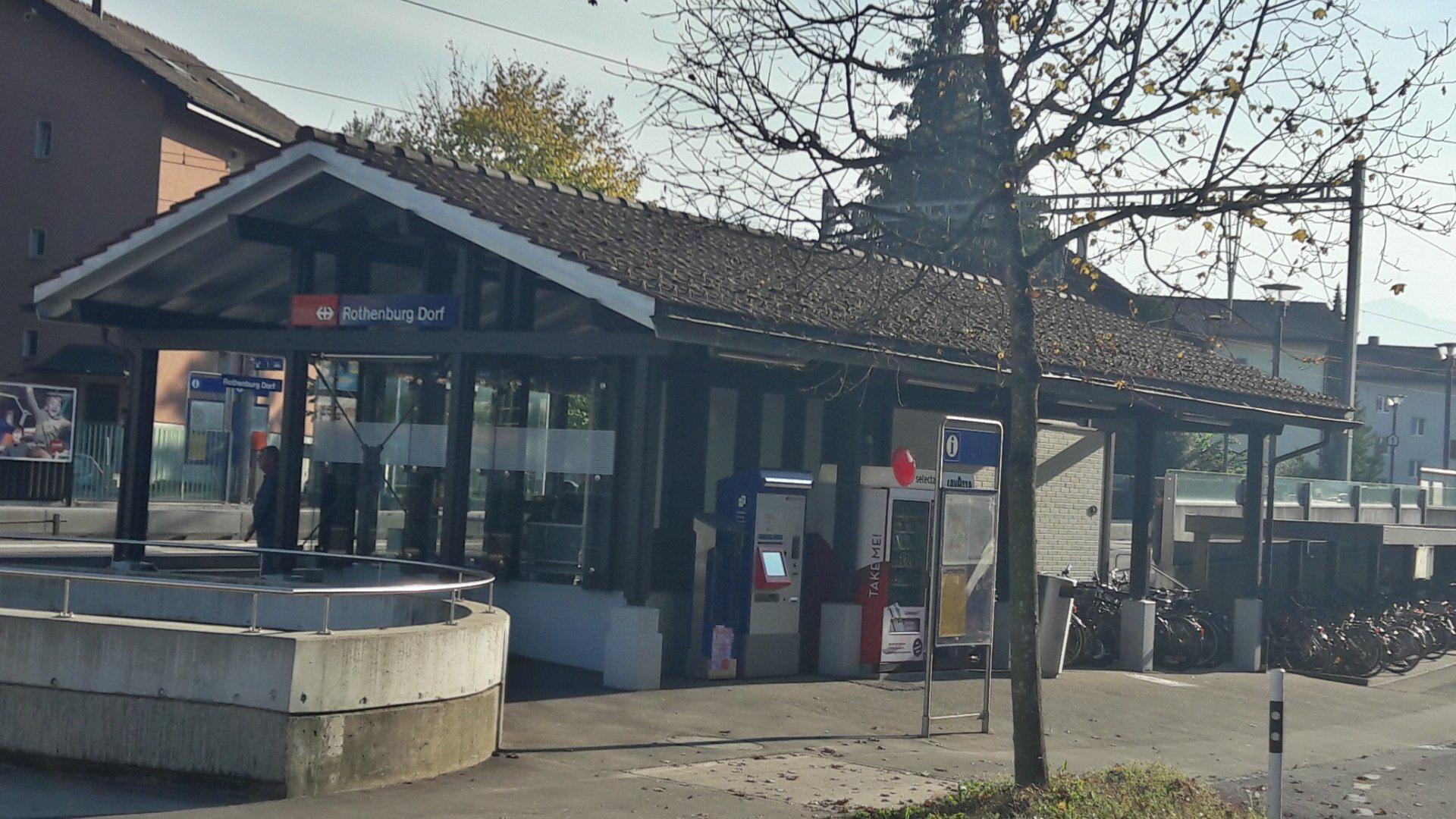
- The station in 2018

General information
- Location: Emmen; Switzerland
- Coordinates: 47°05′N 8°16′E
- Owner: Swiss Federal Railways
- Line: Olten–Lucerne line
- Train operators: Swiss Federal Railways

History
- Former names: Rothenburg Dorf

Services
Preceding station	Lucerne S-Bahn	Following station
Rothenburg Station towards Sursee	S1	Emmenbrücke Gersag towards Baar
Location

Emmenbrücke Kapf railway station (German: Bahnhof Emmenbrücke Kapf) is a railway station in the municipality of Emmen, in the Swiss canton of Lucerne. It is an intermediate stop on the standard gauge Olten–Lucerne line of Swiss Federal Railways. Until the December 2022 timetable change, the station was named Rothenburg Dorf, after the nearby municipality of Rothenburg.

== Services ==
As of the December 2022 timetable change, the following services stop at Emmenbrücke Kapf:

- Lucerne S-Bahn S1: half-hourly service between Sursee and Baar.
