= Emmen, Switzerland =

Emmen
- Municipality
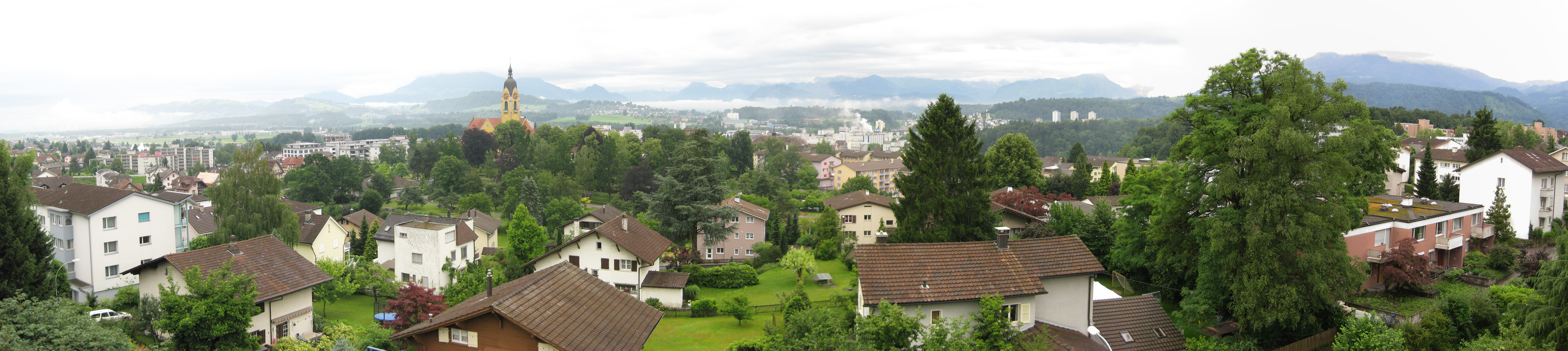

- Flag Coat of arms
- Location of Emmen
- Location within Switzerland Location within Canton of Lucerne
- Coordinates: 47°05′N 8°18′E
- Country: Switzerland
- Canton: Lucerne
- District: Hochdorf

Government
  - Executive: Gemeinderat with 5 members
  - Mayor: Gemeindepräsident
  - Parliament: Einwohnerrat with 40 members

Area
  - Total: 20.37 km^{2} (7.86 sq mi)
- Elevation: 427 m (1,401 ft)

Population (December 2007)
  - Total: 27,205
  - Density: 1,336/km^{2} (3,459/sq mi)
- Time zone: UTC+01:00 (CET)
  - Summer (DST): UTC+02:00 (CEST)
- Postal code: 6032, 6020
- SFOS number: 1024
- ISO 3166 code: CH-LU
- Localities: Emmen, Emmenbrücke, Rottertswil, Gerliswil, Emmenweid, Waldibrücke, Waltwil, Neuhüsern,
- Surrounded by: Buchrain, Ebikon, Eschenbach, Littau, Lucerne, Neuenkirch, Rothenburg
- Website: www.emmen.ch

Emmen (German pronunciation: [ˈɛmən]) is a town and municipality in the district of Hochdorf in the canton of Lucerne in Switzerland. The municipality Emmen consists of the village Emmen, the town Emmenbrücke, and several hamlets.

== History ==
Emmen is first mentioned in 840 as Emau in a document of King Lothair I of Bavaria. For centuries the region was ruled by the Murbach Abbey in Vosges. In 1291 the municipality came under Habsburg rule. After the Battle of Sempach in 1386 the Habsburg's lost Emmen and it became part of the Canton of Lucerne. Emmen also took part in the Swiss peasant war of 1653.

Since 1803, Emmen is part of the Hochdorf District and is its most populous municipality.

In 2008, the municipality of Emmen as well as Adligenswil, Ebikon, Horw and Kriens participated in the «Starke Stadtregion Luzern» project. In it, the merger of individual or several municipalities with the city of Lucerne was examined. In 2011, the merger was proposed by the project management as the most suitable means for the further development of the region around Lucerne. However, the voters of the municipality of Emmen rejected such a proposal in 2012 — as did voters in Adligenswil, Ebikon and Kriens. That meant that Emmen remained an independent municipality. As a result, Thomas Willi who was the president of the municipality at the time and strongly advocated for a merger resigned.

== Politics ==
As every Swiss municipality Emmen has a legislative and executive body, the Einwohnerrat and the Gemeinderat.

=== Einwohnerrat (legislative) ===
The Einwohnerrat has 40 members who are elected every four years. For the legislative period 2024-28, it consists of:

- SVP: 10
- Die Mitte: 9
- FDP: 8
- SP: 7
- Grüne: 3
- FeE (Women engaged in Emmen): 2
- GLP: 1

The current president of the Einwohnerrat is Simon Oehen, SP.

=== Gemeinderat (executive) ===
The five-member Gemeinderat is the executive body. Each of them heads a directorate. In the legislative period 2024–2028, it consists of:

- Ramona Gut-Rogger FDP, Gemeindepräsidentin; Directorate of Security and Sport
- Christian Blunschi Die Mitte, Directorate of Finance and Human Resources
- Brahim Aakti SP, Directorate of School and Culture
- Andreas Roos Die Mitte, Directorate for Construction and Environment
- Beat Niederberger FDP, Directorate of Social Affairs and Society

=== Elections ===
==== Cantonal Council elections ====
In the 2019 Cantonal Council elections in the Canton of Lucerne, the voter percentages in Emmen were: FDP 23.5%, SVP 22.0%, CVP 19.6%, SP 16.7%, GPS 13.4%, glp 5.1%.

==== Swiss federal elections ====
In the 2023 Swiss federal elections, the voter percentages in Emmen were: SVP 28.7%, SP 15.8%, Mitte 21.0%, FDP 17.3%, GPS 7.6%, glp 6.7%, EVP 0.8% and 2.2% for other smaller parties.

== Geography ==
Aerial view (1963)

Emmen has an area of 20.3 km^{2} (7.8 sq mi). Of this area, 46.6% is used for agricultural purposes, while 18.2% is forested. Of the rest of the land, 33.3% is settled (buildings or roads) and the remainder (1.9%) is non-productive (rivers, glaciers or mountains). In the 1997 land survey, 18.19% of the total land area was forested. Of the agricultural land, 44.69% is used for farming or pastures, while 1.92% is used for orchards or vine crops. Of the settled areas, 14.55% is covered with buildings, 5.7% is industrial, 1.62% is classed as special developments, 1.97% is parks or greenbelts and 9.49% is transportation infrastructure. Of the unproductive areas, 0.25% is unproductive standing water (ponds or lakes), and the other 1.62% is unproductive flowing water (rivers).

The municipality is part of the metropolitan area of Lucerne. It is located at the confluence of the Kleine Emme into the Reuss.

== The naturalization law ==
The municipality of Emmen hit international headlines in 2001 when it announced new naturalization law. While there are some fixed requirements for obtaining Swiss citizenship by naturalization set at the federal level, such as the requirement to live and work for 12 years and speak the local language, Swiss cantons and communities are free to introduce more stringent requirements. Until 2001, naturalization was run by a popularly elected committee. But Emmen decided to have the citizens themselves run the nationalization process, requiring that potential citizens pass a series of tests and public interviews and subjecting citizenship applications to the public vote.

This process prevented many Yugoslavs-Swiss people, the largest ethnic group among citizenship candidates (Emmen has one of the largest of ex-Yugoslav community in Switzerland), from obtaining citizenship. Human rights campaigners said that the public interviews and voting were degrading. In July 2003, the practice was ruled discriminatory and unconstitutional by the Supreme Court. Emmen has since returned to the previous system of naturalization committees.

== Population by nationality ==
Emmen has a population (as of 2007) of 27,205, of which 30.7% are foreign nationals. Over the last decade, the population has grown at a rate of 2.7%. Most of the population (as of 2000) speaks German (81.6%), with Serbo-Croatian being second most common (5.0%) and Italian being third (3.9%).

Population by nationality (2000 census)
Nationality	Residents	with dual citizens
Switzerland	18,171	19,456
Serbia-Montenegro	2,332	2,408
Italy	1,299	1,811
Croatia	678	741
Bosnia-Herzegowina	711	727
Spain	500	564
Portugal	449	461
Sri Lanka	286	334
Macedonia	320	326
Germany	212	295
Turkey	152	169
Austria	89	123

== Industry ==
The main industries are steel production, milk processing and arms manufacture. The biggest employers in these areas are Swiss Steel, Emmi AG and Ruag respectively. There is the so-called 'golden triangle' of the sewage plant, the air force base and the waste incinerating plant. Because of the Emmen Air Force Base and the Emmen Anti Aircraft Unit, many of the inhabitants are directly or indirectly employed by the Air Force.

Emmen has an unemployment rate of 3.62%. As of 2005, there were 257 people employed in the primary economic sector and about 58 businesses involved in this sector. 5260 people are employed in the secondary sector and there are 213 businesses in this sector. 8139 people are employed in the tertiary sector, with 693 businesses in this sector. As of 2000, 51.6% of the population of the municipality were employed in some capacity. At the same time, females made up 42.8% of the workforce.

== Demographics ==
In the 2007 election, the most popular party was the SVP which received 33.5% of the vote. The next three most popular parties were the CVP (20.8%), the FDP (20.1%) and the SPS (14.2%).

The age distribution in Emmen is; 5,990 people or 21.7% of the population is 0–19 years old. 7,735 people or 28.1% are 20–39 years old, and 9,489 people or 34.4% are 40–64 years old. The senior population distribution is 3,194 people or 11.6% are 65–79 years old, 1,014 or 3.7% are 80–89 years old and 146 people or 0.5% of the population are 90+ years old.

The entire Swiss population is generally well educated. In Emmen about 61.4% of the population (between age 25–64) have completed either non-mandatory upper secondary education or additional higher education (either university or a Fachhochschule).

As of 2000, there are 11,165 households, of which 3,720 households (or about 33.3%) contain only a single individual. 801 or about 7.2% are large households, with at least five members. As of 2000 there were 2,737 inhabited buildings in the municipality, of which 2,339 were built only as housing, and 398 were mixed use buildings. There were 1,131 single family homes, 217 double family homes, and 991 multi-family homes in the municipality. Most homes were either two (868) or three (791) story structures. There were only 133 single story buildings and 547 four or more story buildings.

In the 2000 census the religious membership of Emmen was; 17,253 (64.2%) were Roman Catholic, and 3,416 (12.7%) were Protestant, with an additional 1,327 (4.94%) that were of some other Christian faith. There are 9 individuals (0.03% of the population) who are Jewish. There are 1,848 individuals (6.87% of the population) who are Muslim. Of the rest; there were 228 (0.85%) individuals who belong to another religion, 1,753 (6.52%) who do not belong to any organized religion, 1,051 (3.91%) who did not answer the question.

The historical population is given in the following table:

year	population
1456	c. 150
around 1695	c. 550
1798	1,330
1850	1,764
1900	3,162
1950	11,065
1970	22,040
2000	26,885
2010	28,031
2020	31,039

== Transportation ==
The municipality is thoroughly served by Lucerne's urban transit system VBL, which is part of the fare network passepartout. Two railway lines (S1, RE, S9, S99) lead through the municipality and serves four railway stations: Emmenbrücke, Emmenbrücke Gersag, Emmenbrücke Kapf, and Waldibrücke. All stops in the municipality are situated within passepartout's innermost zone No. 10, the same as Lucerne.

The military airbase Emmen Air Base (IATA: EML, ICAO: LSME) is part of the municipality.

== Sport ==
Emmen has two football clubs, the FC Emmenbrücke and the SC Emmen.

== Notable people ==
- Mario Bühler (born 1992) a football defender playing for FC Vaduz
- Kurt Koch (born 1950) cardinal and President of the Pontifical Council for Promoting Christian Unity. He was the bishop of Basel from 1996 until 2010.
- Raphael Koch (born 1990) a footballer, currently plays as a defender for FC Solothurn
- Xaver Kurmann (born 1948) a retired Swiss amateur cyclist
- Loredana Zefi (born 1995) rapper
