= Hochdorf railway station =

Swiss railway station

Hochdorf
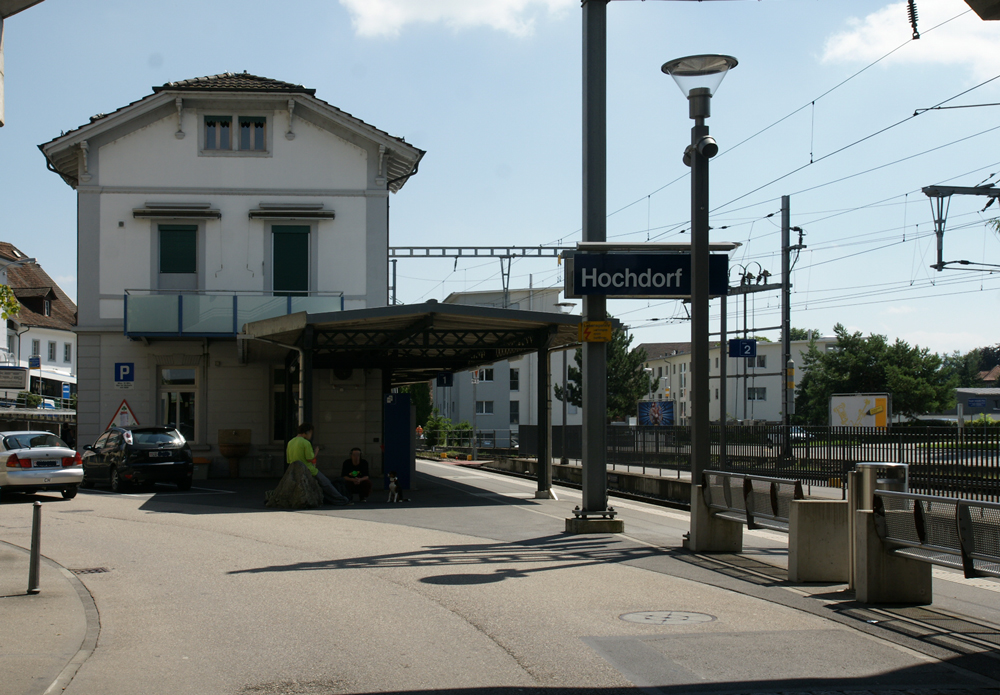
- The station building in 2010

General information
- Location: Hochdorf; Switzerland
- Coordinates: 47°10′01″N 8°17′19″E
- Owner: Swiss Federal Railways
- Line: Seetal line
- Train operators: Swiss Federal Railways

Services
Preceding station	Lucerne S-Bahn	Following station
Baldegg Kloster towards Lenzburg	S9	Hochdorf Schönau towards Lucerne
Terminus	S99	Hochdorf Schönau towards Lucerne
Location
- Location within Switzerland Location within Canton of Lucerne

Aerial view from 100 m by Walter Mittelholzer (1919)

Hochdorf railway station (German: Bahnhof Hochdorf) is a railway station in the municipality of Hochdorf, in the Swiss canton of Lucerne. It is an intermediate stop on the standard gauge Seetal line of Swiss Federal Railways.

== Services ==
The following services stop at Hochdorf:

- Lucerne S-Bahn: S9/S99: half-hourly service between Lucerne and Lenzburg, with additional service at rush hour to Lucerne.
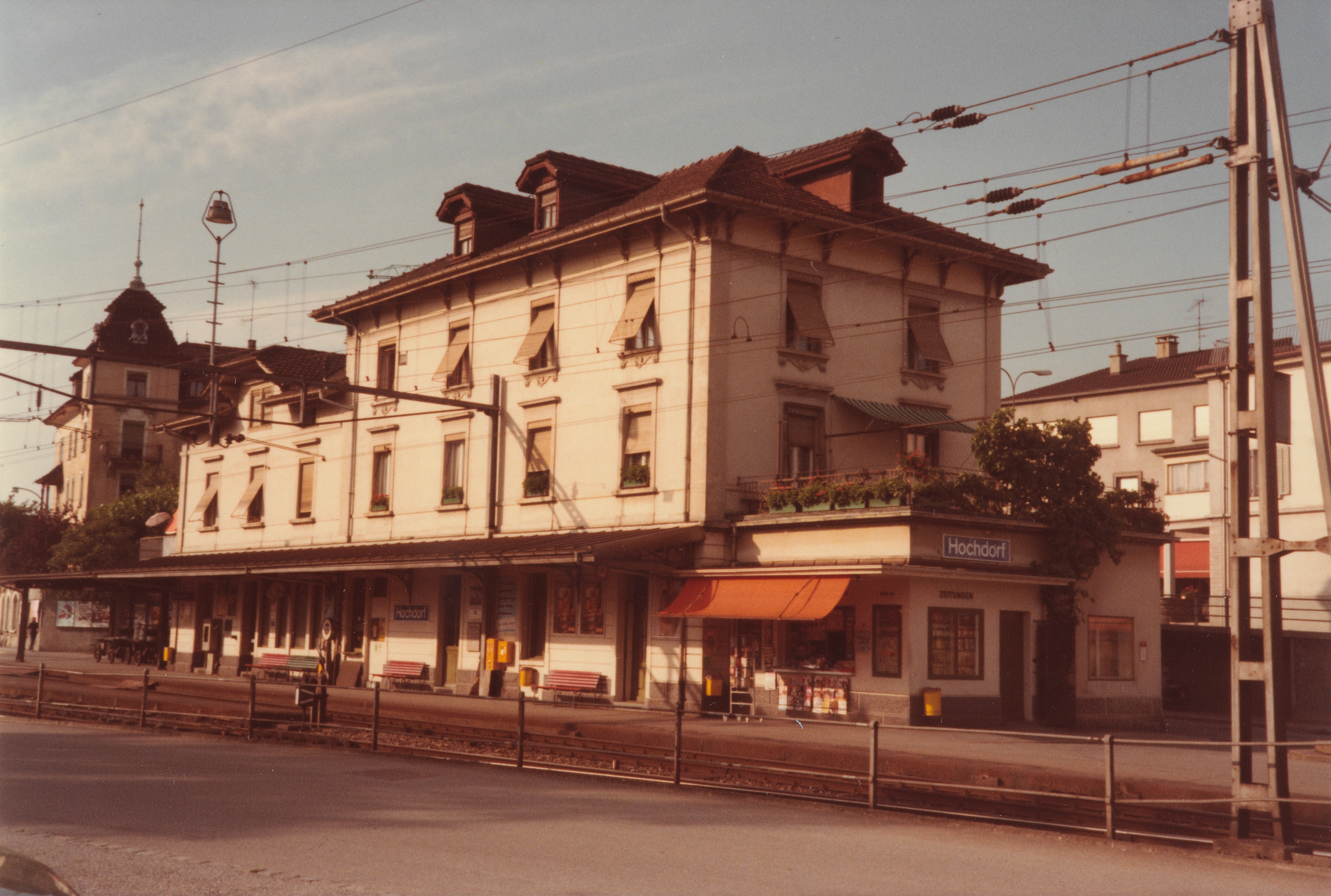
Station in 1981

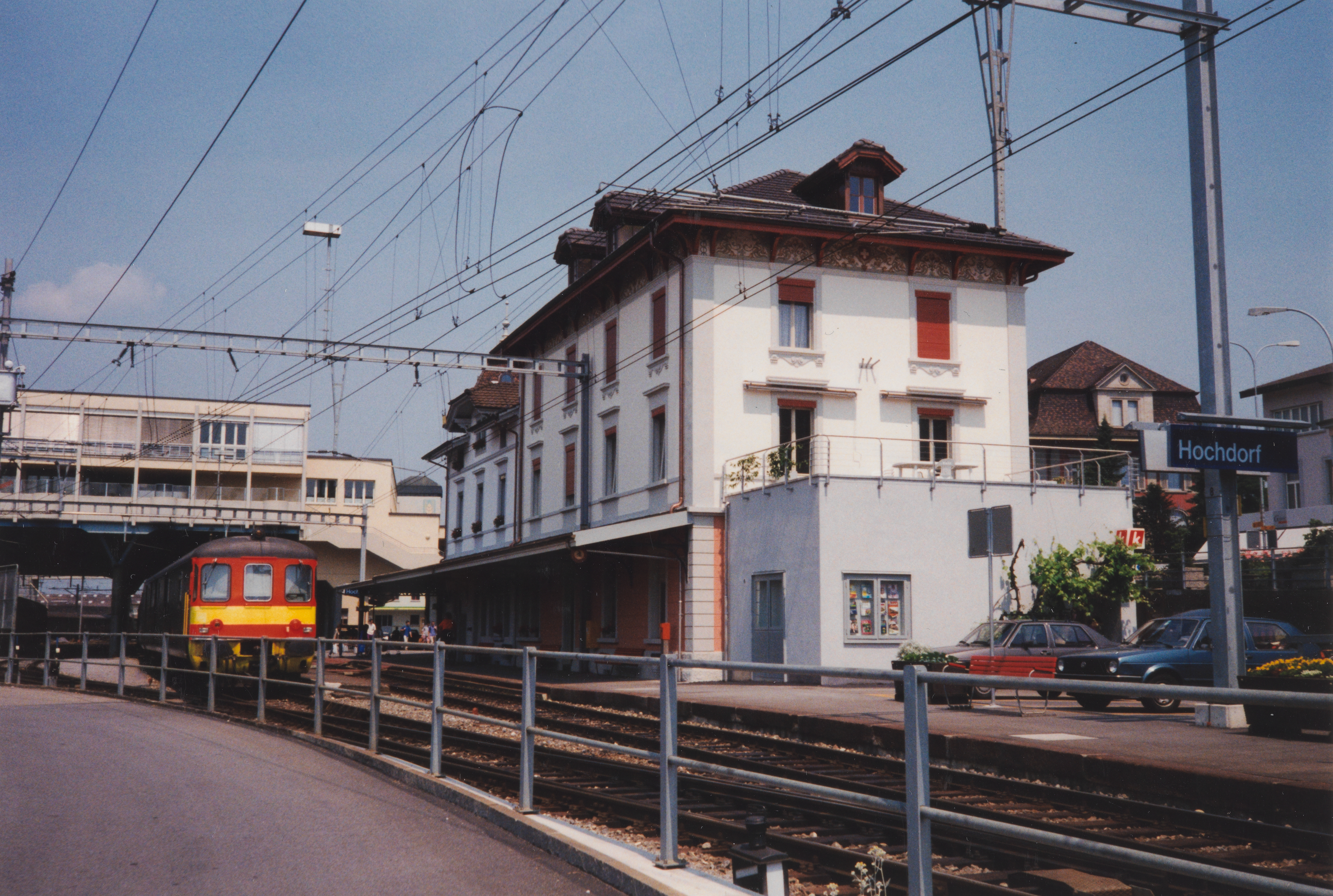
Station in 1995

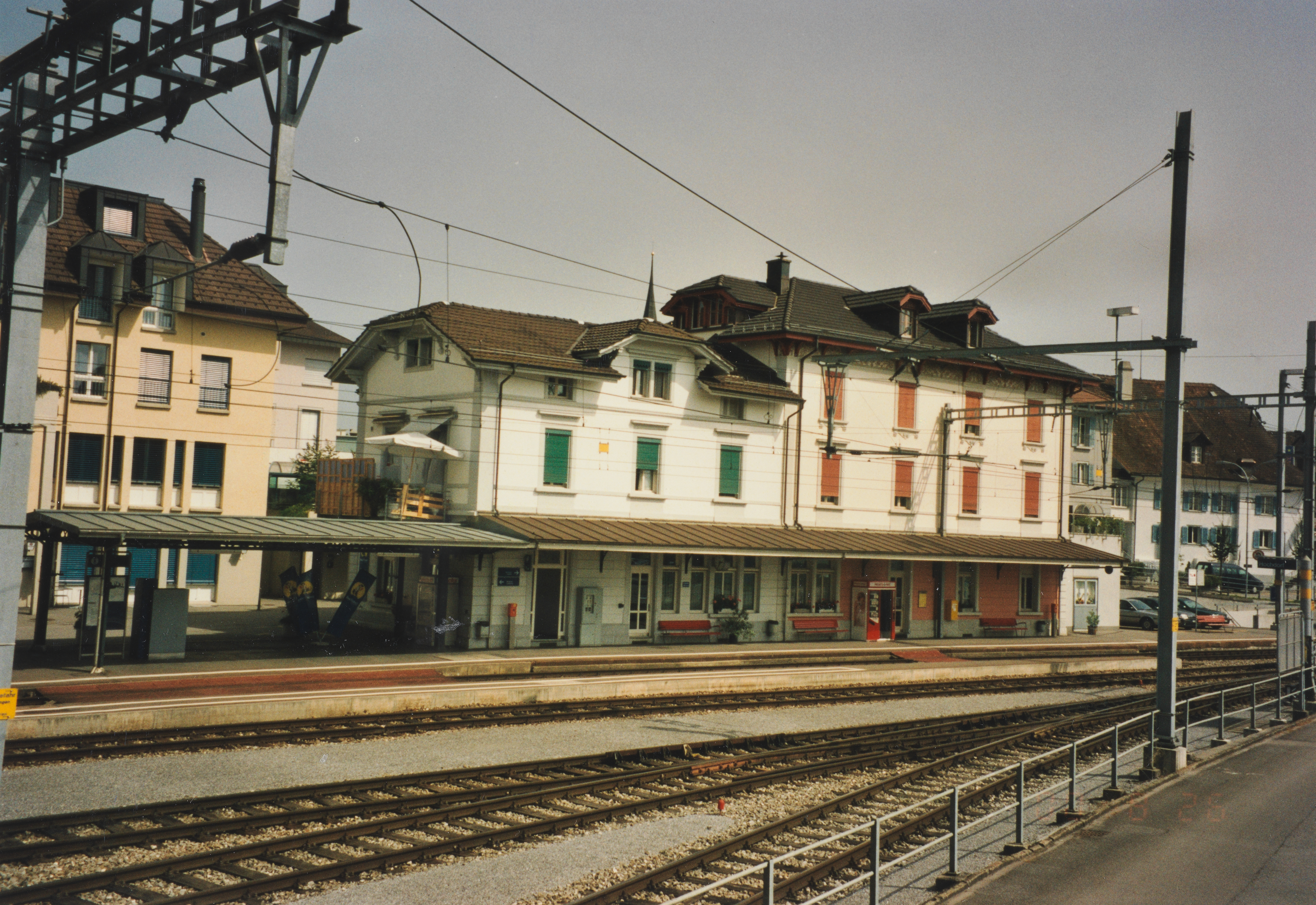
Station in 2000

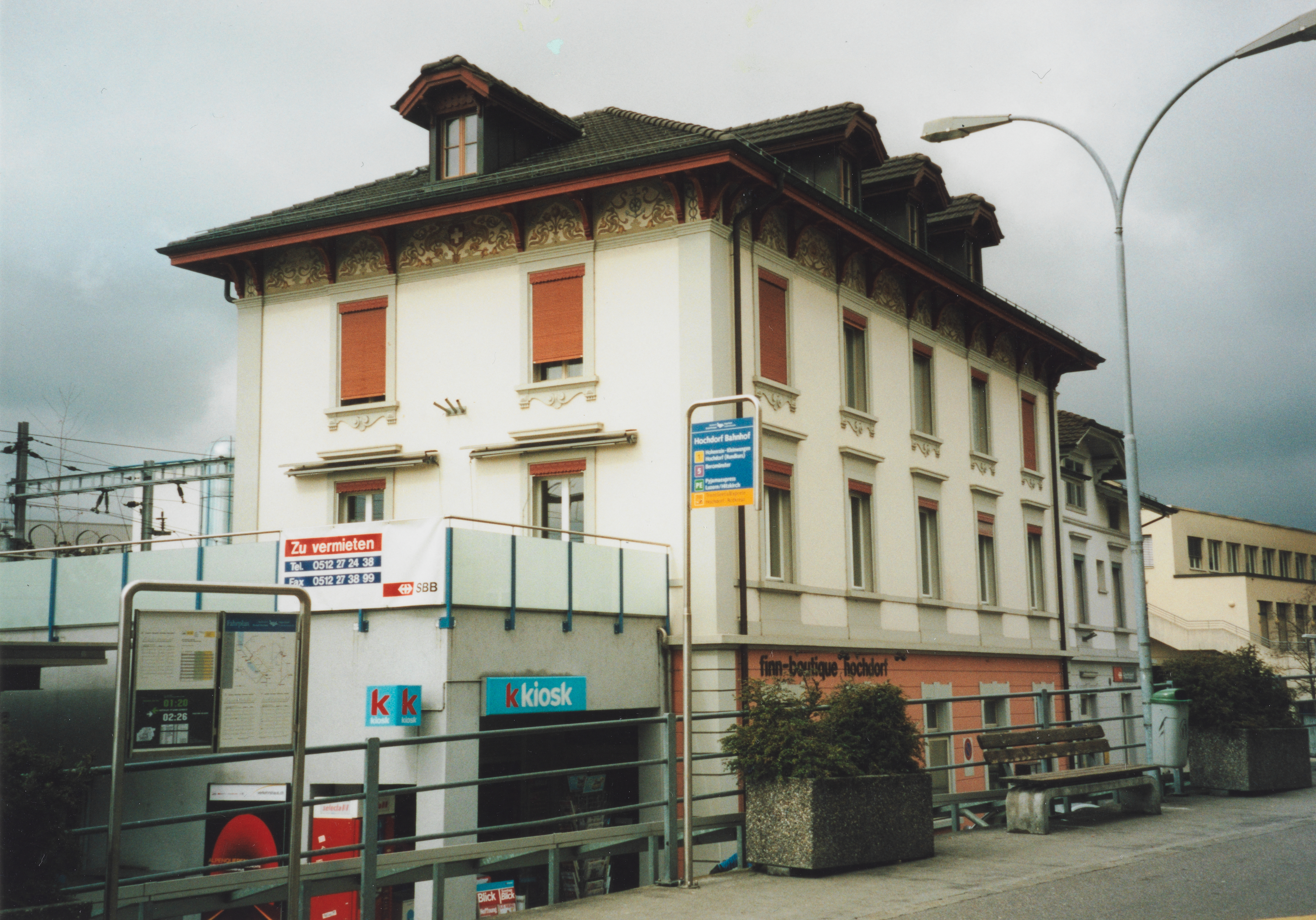
Station in 2007
