= Seetal railway line =

Railway line in Switzerland

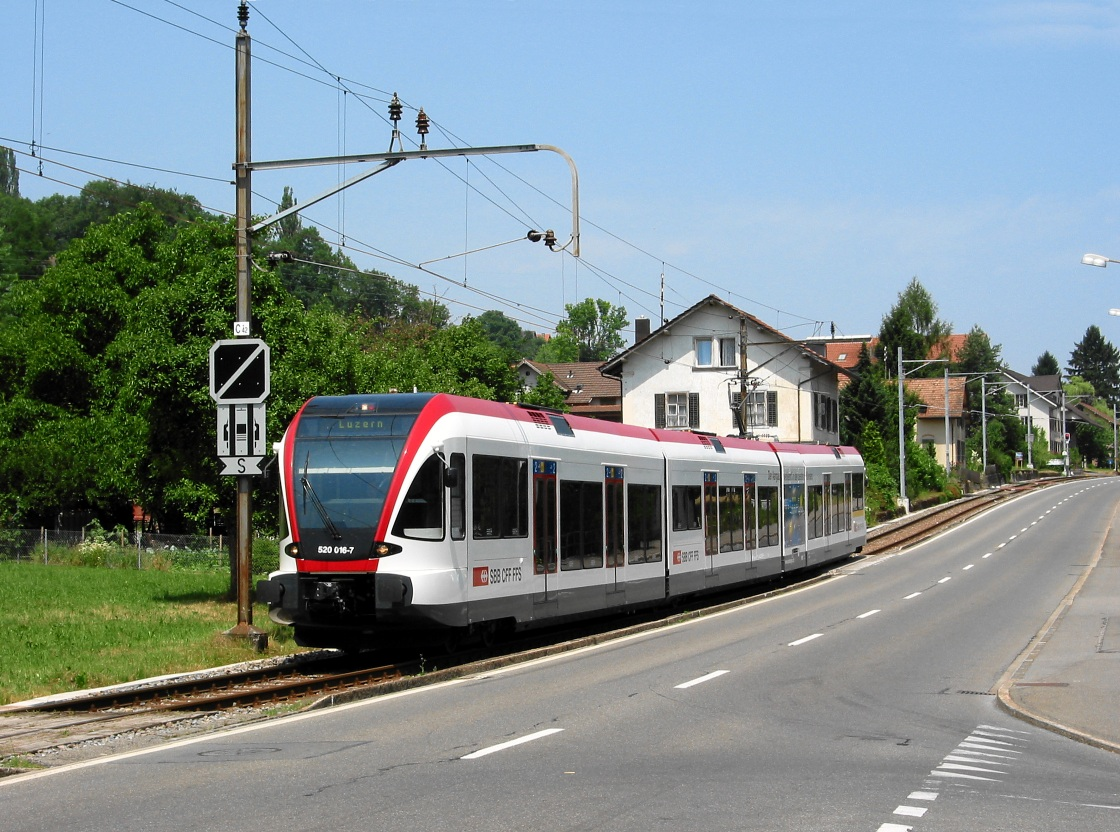
- A modern Seetal train on typical trackage along the route

Overview
- Owner: Swiss Federal Railways
- Termini: Lenzburg; Lucerne

Service
- Operator(s): Swiss Federal Railways

History
- Opened: 1883

Technical
- Line length: 47 km (29 mi)
- Track gauge: 1,435 mm (4 ft 8 1/2 in)
- Electrification: 15 kV 16.7 Hz AC
- Maximum incline: 3.8%

The Seetal railway line (German: Seetalbahn) is a 1,435 mm (4 ft 8 1/2 in) (standard-gauge) railway of the Swiss Federal Railways between Lenzburg and Lucerne in Switzerland. The line was opened in 1883 by the Lake Valley of Switzerland Railway Company, which was owned by British investors, and subsequently owned by the Schweizerische Seethalbahn-Gesellschaft (SthB).

As built, the line had many of the characteristics of an interurban tramway, following the parallel road almost throughout and running within the villages, separating houses from the road. Despite right-of-way improvements and the introduction of narrower trains to avoid clipping accidents, much of this nature has survived to the current day.

== History ==
=== Inception ===
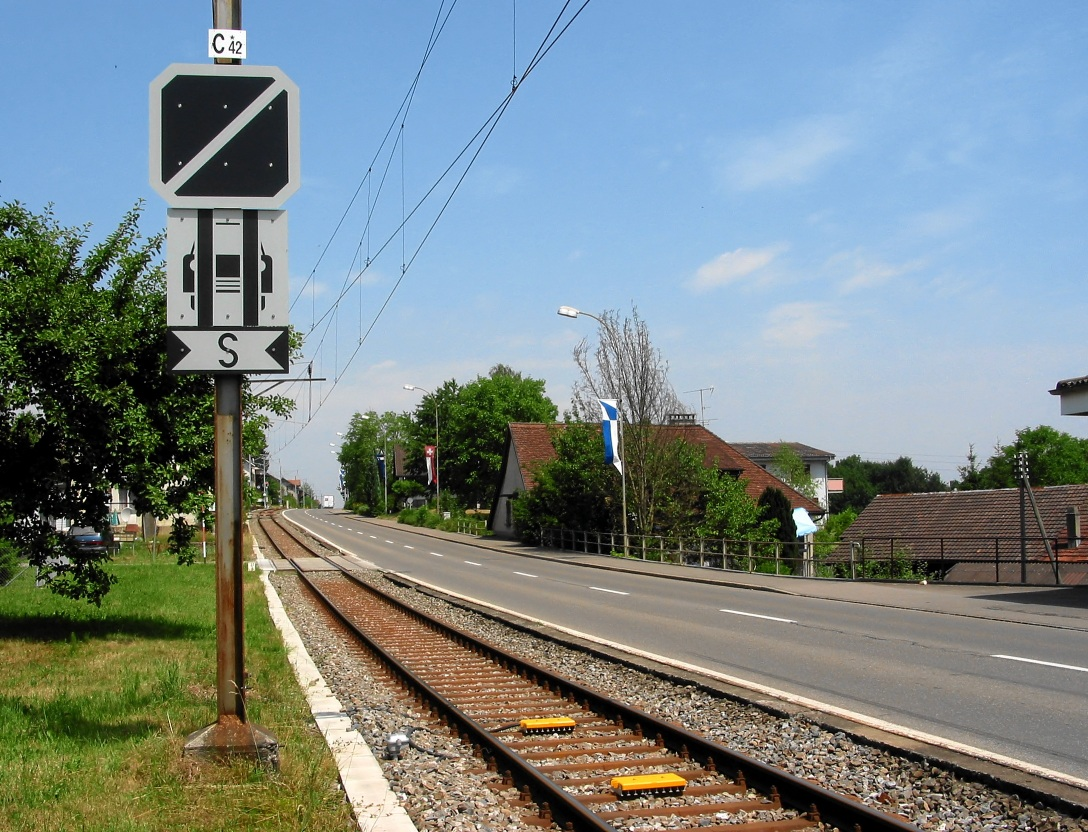
Typical roadside track

In the communities of the Seetal valley, it was hoped initially that the main line from Basel to Lucerne would be routed through the valley, but the Swiss Central Railway opted for a route via Zofingen, Sursee and Sempach. At around the same time, the engineer Theodor Lutz developed a concept for the construction of local railways. According to his ideas, these railways should share the use of existing roads, which would anyway lose the most traffic at the newly opened railway. In addition, this allowed the introduction of the local train directly into the town centers.

Lutz managed to raise finance from investors in London to put his ideas into practice on a line through the Seetal. On 22 August 1882 the Lake Valley Railway Company of Switzerland was established in London.

On September 3, 1883, the first section was opened. The passengers included tourists from Lucerne doing sightseeing tours to the Hallwilersee and Baldeggersee lakes. Expansions of the main line followed, as well as a short branch line between Beinwil and Beromünster.

=== Changes of ownership ===
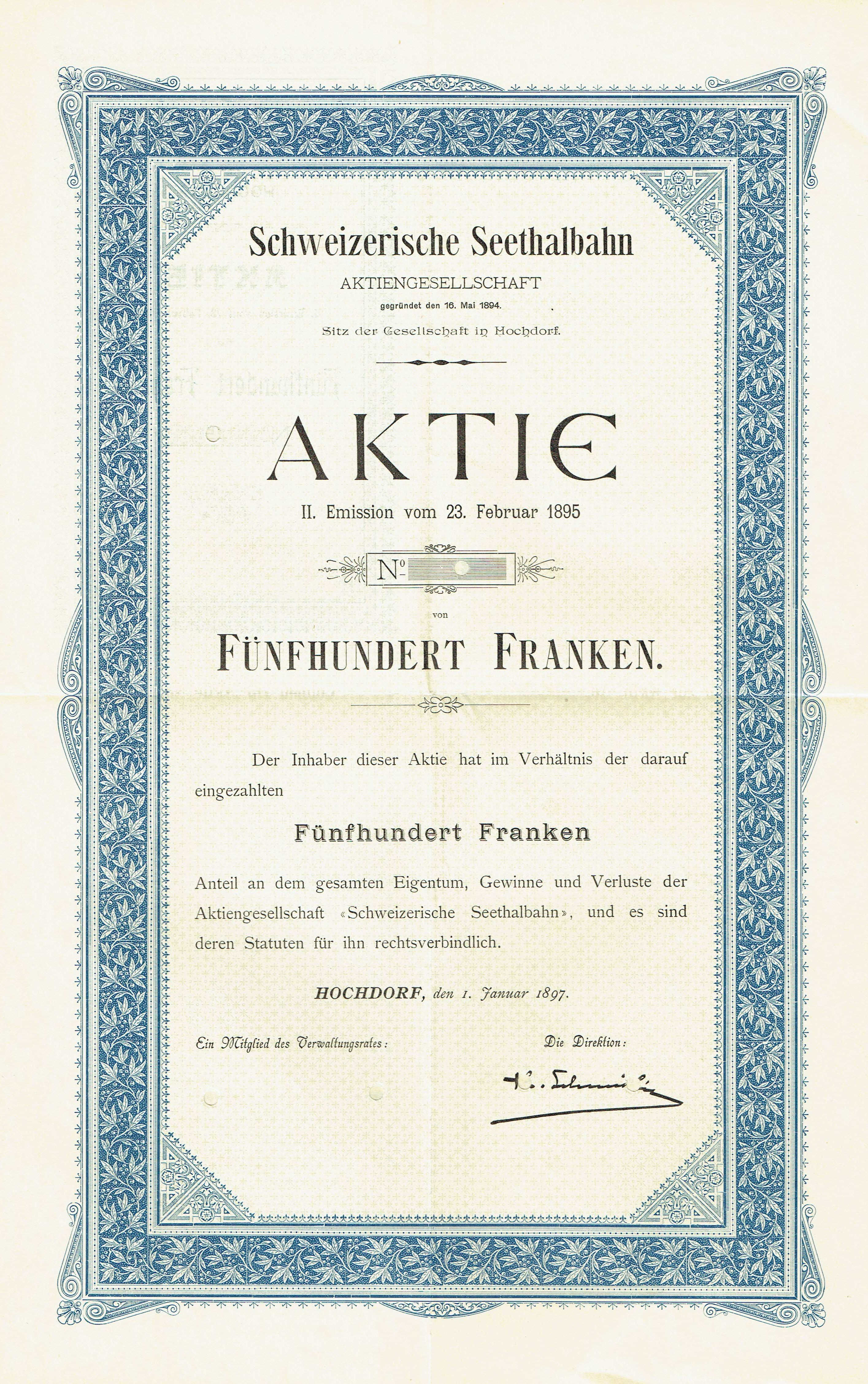
Share of the Schweizerische Seethalbahn AG, issued 1. January 1897

The profitable expectations of the British investors were not fulfilled, and so they sold the line in 1894 to the newly founded Schweizerische Seethalbahn Aktiengesellschaft (SthB). They made various improvements, including the introduction of restaurant carriages. They were also pioneers of the electrification of Switzerland's railways, starting electric service in 1910 with 5.5 kV 25 Hz AC. Despite their efforts, the line remained unprofitable.

In 1922 the line was acquired by the Swiss Confederation and incorporated into the Swiss Federal Railways (SBB). In 1930, the SBB modified the electrification to its standard of 15 kV 16.7 Hz AC. Passenger service over the branch line between Beinwil and Beromünster ended in 1992 and the line was abandoned in 2001. It now forms part of a cycle path.

=== Rebuild ===
Sign graphically warning of the dangers of the proximity of road and rail on the line

As originally built, the line had 500 unguarded level crossings in a distance of 40 km -- one crossing every 80 m. Consequently, by the end of the 20th century, the Seetalbahn had by far the worst safety record of all SBB lines. Between 1987 and 1992 the line accounted for around half of all the SBB's level crossing accidents and there were nine fatalities on the line. Improvement of safety was therefore a major target for the line.

Although the line's infrastructure had many of the attributes of a roadside tramway or light railway, it was operated using standard heavy rail rolling stock, with its greater width and longer stopping distances. Various options were investigated, including a major realignment of the line to more conventional heavy rail standards, but this had the twin disadvantages of a very high cost coupled with losing the attractiveness of bringing public transport to the hearts of the villages along the line.

Switching to off-the-shelf trams was discussed, and a vehicle from the Saarbrücken tramway was tried out on the line in 1998. In the end, the decision was made to finally equip the line with purpose-built interurban cars, featuring low-floor access and a limited 2.7 m (8 ft 10 in) width. The reduced loading gauge allowed the infrastructure on the northern section of the line, between Lenzburg and Hitzkirch, to be reconfigured providing more space between parallel road lanes and at level crossings.

Enhanced brakes on the new railcars allowed tramway-like "drive-by-sight" operation through the villages with a maximum speed of 40 km/h (25 mph), whilst speed on other parts of the line was increased to 80 km/h (50 mph). Other parts of the line were realigned to avoid conflict and as many level crossings as possible were removed.

== Operation ==
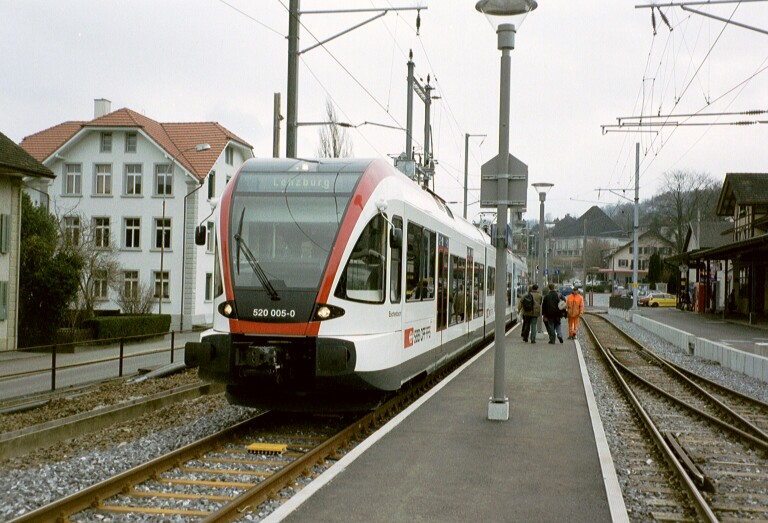
A RABe 520 railcar in Beinwil am See station

As a consequence of the reduction of the loading gauge width from 5 m (16 ft) to 3.8 metres (12 ft), only specially cleared vehicles can use the northern section of the line between Lenzburg and Hitzkirch. The southern section, from Lucerne to Hitzkirch, still has a normal profile, allowing freight and other traffic to operate.

Passenger services are operated by the SBB RABe 520, a 2.7 m (8 ft 10 in) wide, four section variant of the Stadler GTW train. This variant was specially created for the Seetal line, although it is cleared to operate anywhere on the SBB network. The passenger service on the line operates every half-hour, and is designated as service S9 of the Lucerne S-Bahn.
