= Lucerne S-Bahn =

Commuter rail in Lucerne, Switzerland

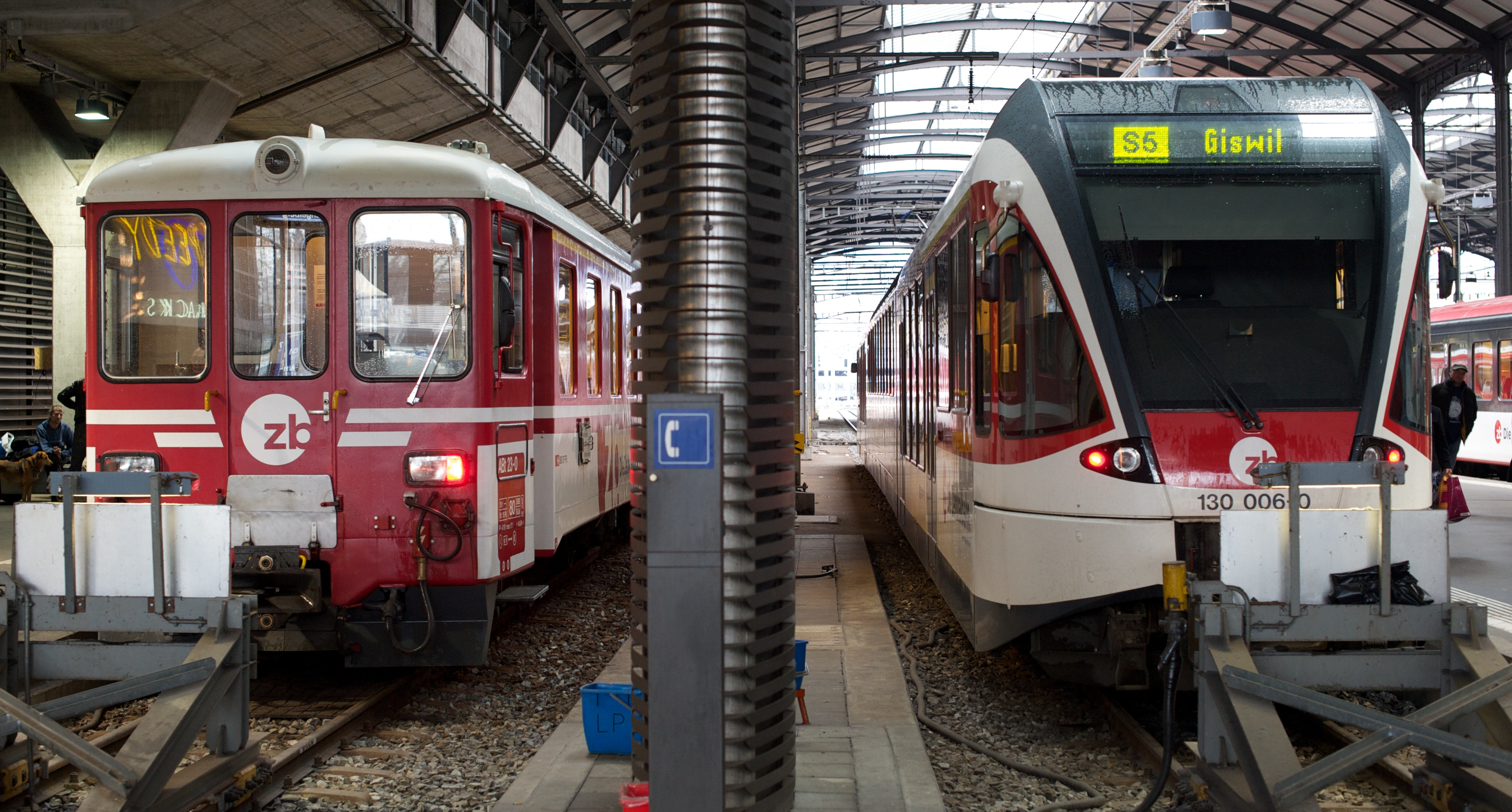
- zb trains at Lucerne, Stadler Spatz at right.

Overview
- Locale: Lucerne, Switzerland
- Transit type: S-Bahn
- Number of lines: 13
- Website: S-Bahn Luzern

Operation
- Began operation: 12 December 2004
- Operators: SBB CFF FFS zb SOB; BLS AG

Technical
- Track gauge: 1,435 mm (4 ft 8 1/2 in) standard gauge 1,000 mm (3 ft 3 3/8 in) metre gauge

The Lucerne S-Bahn (German: S-Bahn Luzern) is an S-Bahn-style commuter rail network focusing on Lucerne in Central Switzerland.

Opened on 12 December 2004, the network forms part of the Central Switzerland S-Bahn project (German: S-Bahn Zentralschweiz), which also includes the Zug Stadtbahn (German: Stadtbahn Zug).

The system connects to services of Aargau S-Bahn, Bern S-Bahn and Zurich S-Bahn. At larger stations, notably Arth-Goldau, Lucerne and Zug, its lines also connect to long-distance trains (RE, IR, IC, EC). It also connects to mountain railways, such as the Pilatus Railway or the Arth-Rigi railway. Lakeside stations are often close to landing sites served by the Lake Lucerne Navigation Company.

== Lines ==
As of 2021, the network consisted of the following lines:

#	Route	Notes	Operator
S1	Sursee–Lucerne–Rotkreuz–Zug–Baar	Also S1 of the Zug Stadtbahn	SBB
S3	Lucerne–Arth-Goldau–Schwyz–Brunnen		SBB
S4	(Wolfenschiessen–)Dallenwil–Stans–Lucerne		Zentralbahn
S5	Giswil–Sarnen–Lucerne		Zentralbahn
S6	Langnau i.E./Langenthal–Lucerne	Operates as a single train between Lucerne and Wolhusen.	BLS
S7	Langenthal–Wolhusen		BLS
S9	Lenzburg–Lucerne		SBB
S31	Arth-Goldau–Biberbrugg		Südostbahn
S41	Horw–Lucerne	Only during rush hour	Zentralbahn
S44	Stans–Lucerne	Only during rush hour	Zentralbahn
S55	Sachseln–Sarnen–Lucerne	Only during rush hour	Zentralbahn
S77	Willisau–Lucerne	Introduced on 15 December 2019, replacing the S61. Runs only during rush hour.	BLS
S99	Hochdorf–Lucerne	Only during rush hour	SBB

== See also ==
- Trolleybuses in Lucerne
- Rail transport in Switzerland
