= Kambly (disambiguation) =

Kambly may refer to:

- Kambly, a biscuit factory
- Oscar Kambly, the founder of Kambly
- Johann Melchior Kambly, a Swiss sculptor
