= Trubschachen railway station =

Railway station in Trubschachen, Switzerland

Trubschachen
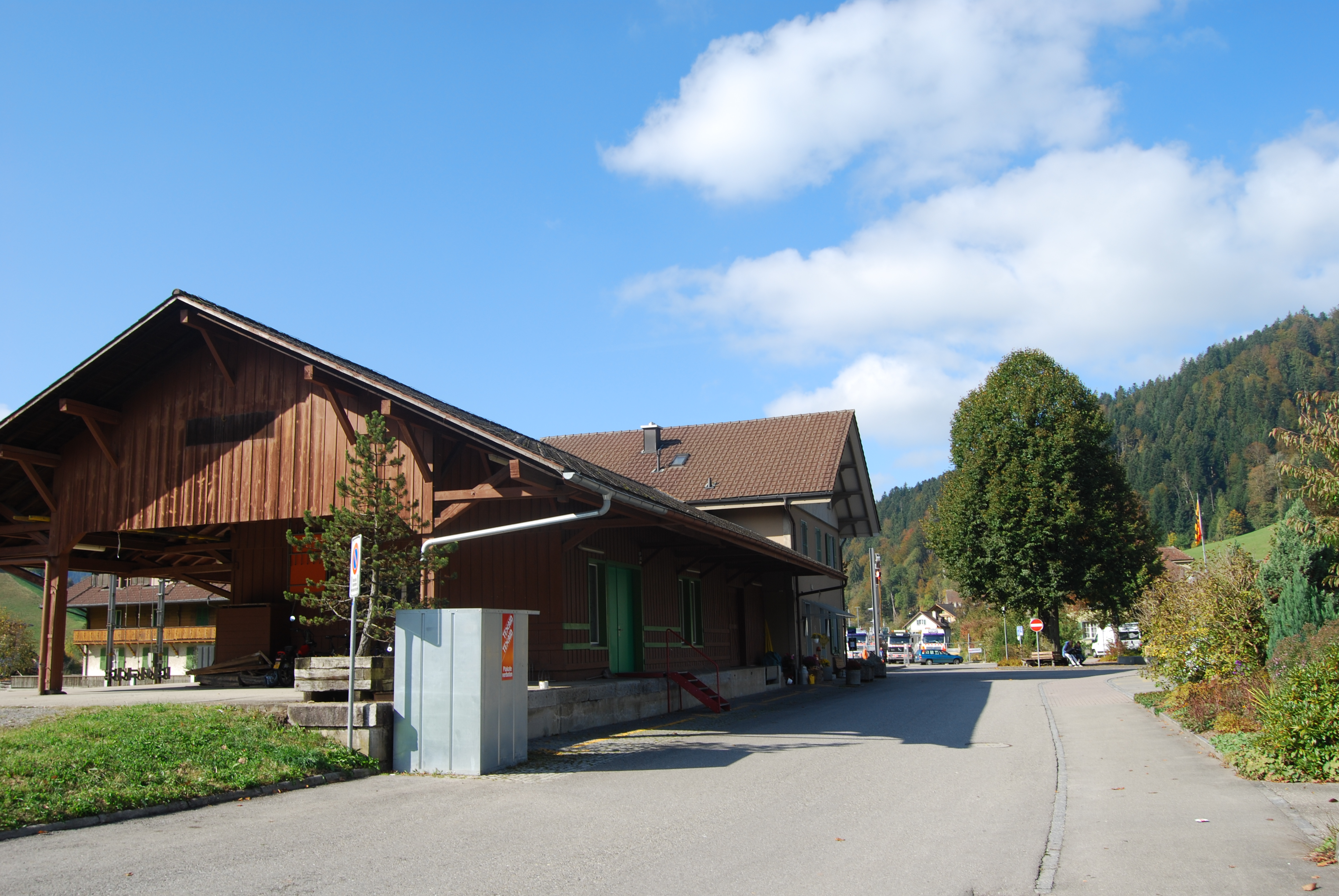
- The station building in 2009

General information
- Location: Trubschachen; Switzerland
- Coordinates: 46°55′18″N 7°50′46″E
- Elevation: 732 m (2,402 ft)
- Owner: Swiss Federal Railways
- Line: Bern–Lucerne line
- Platforms: 2 side platforms
- Tracks: 3
- Train operators: BLS AG
- Connections: Busland AG buses

Construction
- Parking: Yes (41 spaces)
- Cycle facilities: Yes (40 spaces)
- Accessible: No

Other information
- Station code: 8508208 (TSCH)
- Fare zone: 145 (Libero)

Passengers
- 2023: 760 per weekday (BLS)

Services
Preceding station	Lucerne S-Bahn	Following station
Langnau i.E. Terminus	S6	Escholzmatt towards Lucerne
Preceding station	BLS	Following station
Langnau i.E. towards Bern	RE7	Escholzmatt towards Lucerne
Location

Trubschachen railway station (German: Bahnhof Trubschachen) is a railway station in the municipality of Trubschachen, in the Swiss canton of Bern. It is an intermediate stop on the standard gauge Bern–Lucerne line of Swiss Federal Railways.

== History ==
Between January 2025 and December 2025 the station's infrastructure will be upgraded. A new side platform and the current side platform will be built at a height of 55 centimetres (22 in) and at a length of 220 metres (720 ft) to permit barrier-free boarding. A waiting area will be created on each platform with a ticket machine, passenger information display, benches and a waste bin. The tracks will be also replaced.

== Services ==
As of the December 2024 timetable change, the following services stop at Trubschachen:

- RegioExpress/Lucerne S-Bahn S6: half-hourly service between Langnau i.E. and Lucerne, with every other train continuing from Langnau i.E. to Bern.
