= Hasle railway station =

Hasle railway station could refer to:

- Hasle (station) on the Oslo Metro
- Hasle LU railway station in Hasle, Lucerne, Switzerland
