= Kambly =

Swiss biscuit factory

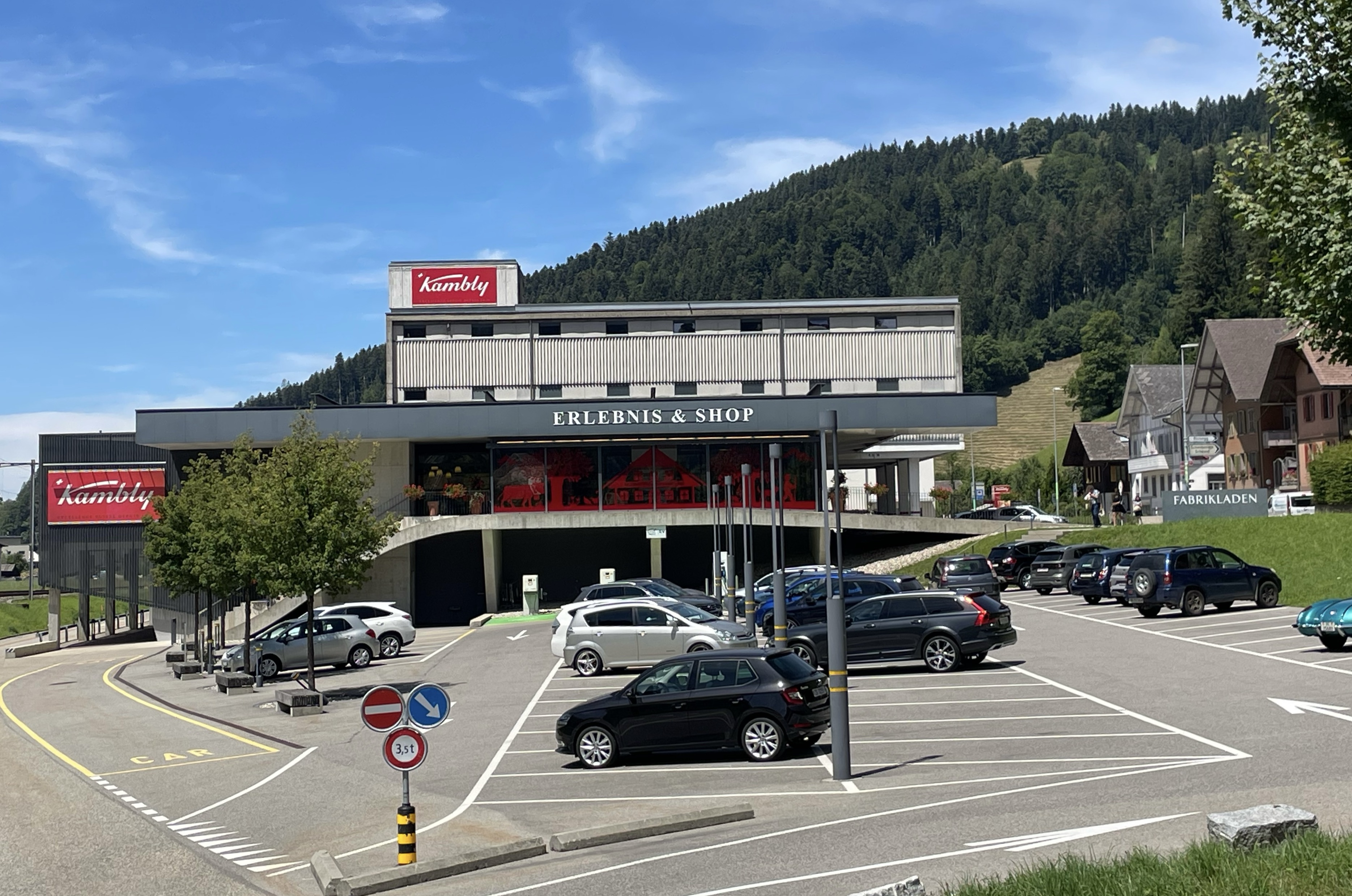
- Kambly's headquarters in Trubschachen, Switzerland
- Native name: Kambly SA Spécialités de biscuits suisses
- Type: Private
- Founded: 1910; 116 years ago in Trubschachen, Switzerland
- Founder: Oscar Robert Kambly
- Key people: Dania Kambly (Chairwoman and CEO)
- Products: Biscuits
- Revenue: CHF 180 million (2023)
- Owner: Kambly family
- Number of employees: 650 (2023)
- Parent: Kambly Holding Ltd.
- Website: kambly.com

Kambly (/kɑːmbləə/; kamb-lee officially Kambly SA) is a Swiss commercial bakery and manufacturer of biscuits based in Trubschachen (BE), Switzerland. Founded in 1910 by Oscar Robert Kambly in the Emmental region, the company remains family-owned and exports their products globally. Today the company is controlled by the third, respectively fourth generation of the Kambly family, which is also involved in philanthropic work.

== History ==
In 1906, Oscar Kambly, II. (1887-1957), whose father originally hailed from Zürich, met a young girl during a stay in the French part of Switzerland. The original spelling of the family name was Kambli and has been adjusted somewhen by Oscar to differentiate from the well-established Zurich branch of the family. His future wife hailed from the village of Trubschachen in the Emmental valley. He followed her to there and completed an apprenticeship as baker and confectionary maker in the village's bakery.

In 1910, together with his brother Paul Kambly, he established the company which today is known as Kambly SA and they began to transform the village bakery to a biscuit factory and commercially manufacture items. His original recipes, like the famed Bretzeli (1906) and Caramels à la Crème d'Emmental (1924) are still widely known and a staple in Swiss, German and French households. In 1954 the Goldfish Crackers were invented by Oscar J. Kambly, a member of the second generation.

== Organization ==
In June 2020, Oscar A. Kambly III, stepped back from management and gave the position of CEO to his son-in-law, German-born Nils Kambly, who took the last name of his wife. Dania Kambly is responsible for the Business development and chairwoman. In 2026 the couple separated, Nils Kambly left the company, Dania Kambly took over the management of the company as a CEO.

== Products ==
Kambly's oldest and most well known product is the famed Bretzeli which was based on a recipe of Oscar Kambly's grandmother which he commercialized as early as 1906 and is still produced to this day and distributed to many countries. Since 1959, Kambly manufactures Military biscuits for the Swiss Armed Forces, which are also available for civilian customers since 2010.
