= Military chocolate (Switzerland) =

Chocolate issued in the Swiss military

Swiss military chocolate

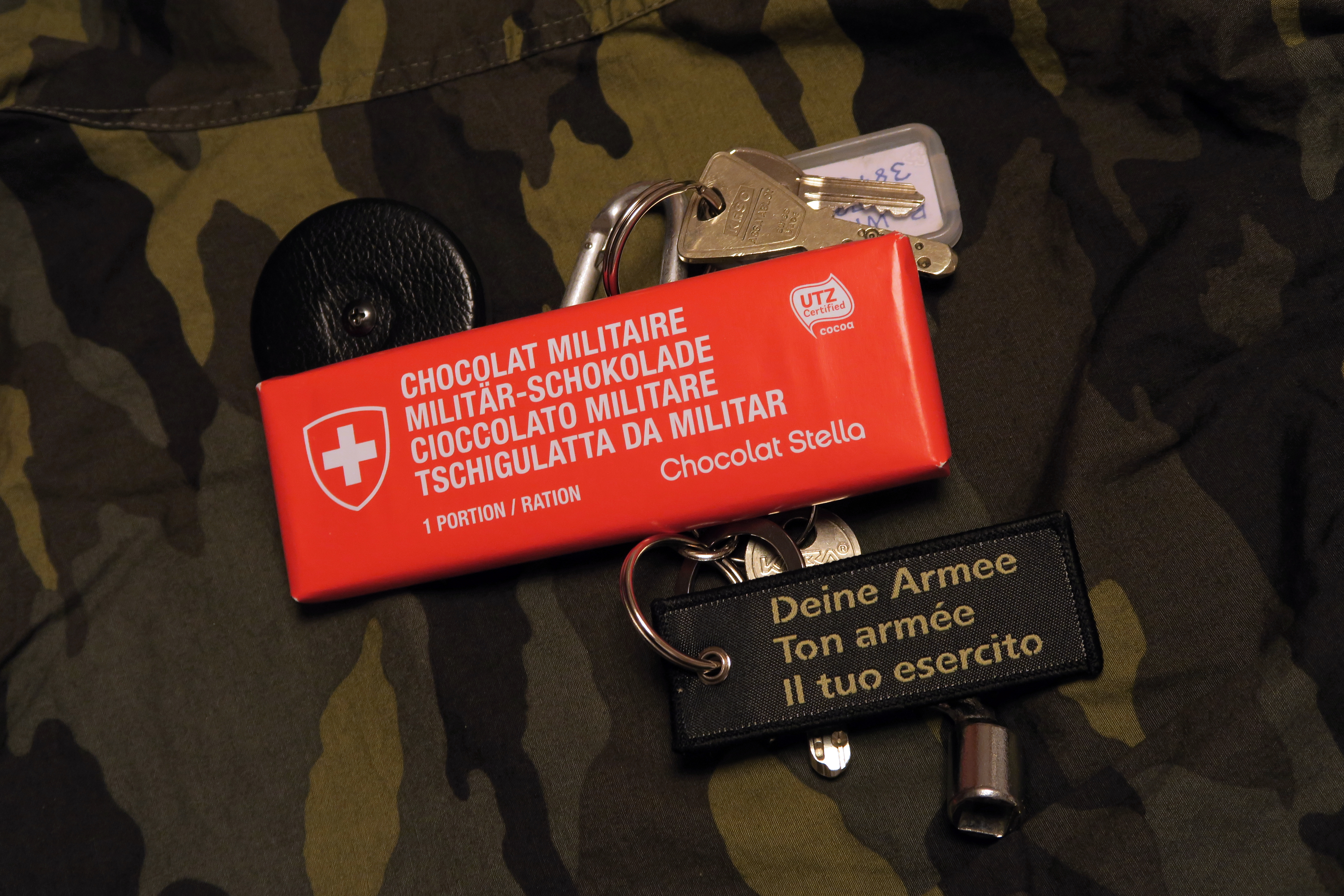
Front of a standard 50-gram bar, equivalent to 1 ration (keys for scale)

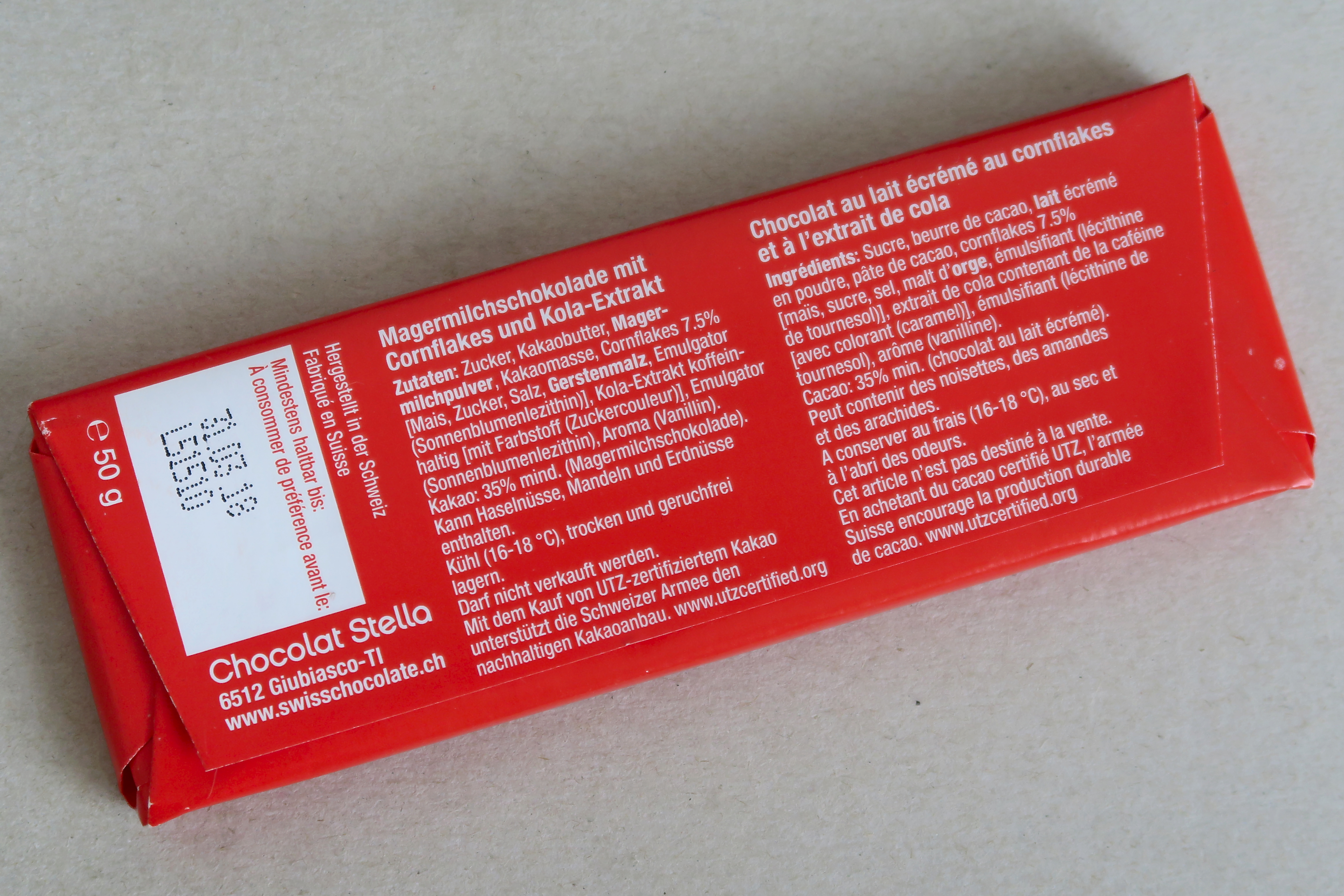
Back of the bar with a list of ingredients

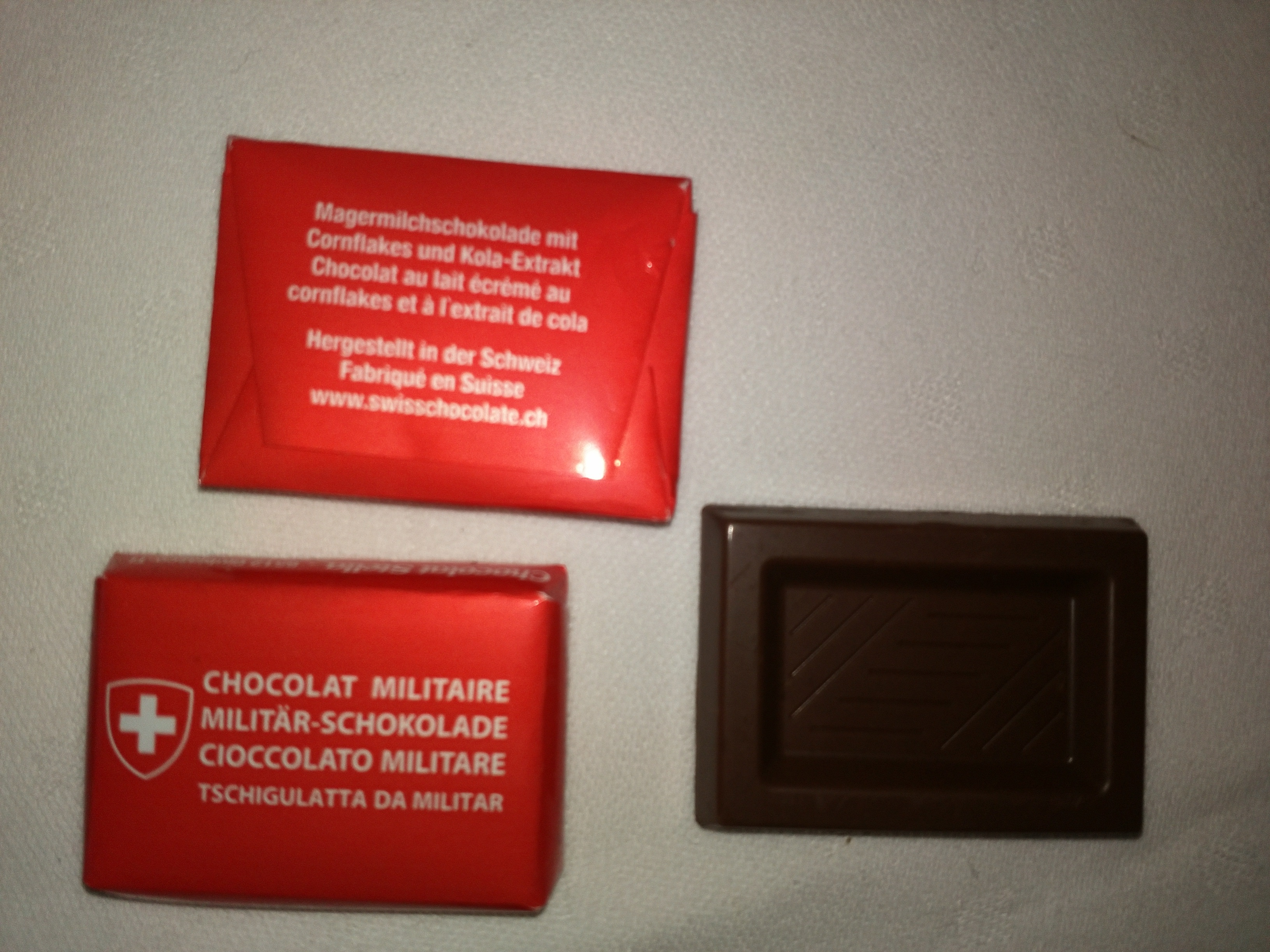
Non-standard 5-gram neapolitans

Military chocolate (German: Militärschokolade; French: chocolat militaire; Italian: cioccolato militare; Romansh: tschigulatta da militar) is a standard food item of the Swiss Armed Forces' military rations. Swiss soldiers were originally given dark chocolate as part of their emergency rations, with smaller quantities of milk chocolate being distributed occasionally. The popularity of the milk chocolate led to it replacing the dark chocolate in the emergency rations.

== History ==
The military chocolate had the official designation "emergency rations" (Notportion, ration de secours, razione di soccorso or raziun da reserva) in the Swiss army. It was dark chocolate packed in two white cardboard boxes, which were covered with a transparent plastic film. They were about the size of a cigarette box. The two cardboard boxes were connected but could easily be separated by a perforation. This military chocolate was produced by several companies, such as Villars-Maitre-Chocolatier and Chocolat Stella. For decades the military chocolate has been part of the basic rations for Swiss soldiers. In addition to the military biscuit, it is popular for schoolchildren who receive them from soldiers. The military chocolate thus achieved a certain cult status.

In the course of time, a chocolate bar of 50 grams was introduced into a red paper package and a milk chocolate bar of 50 grams in red plastic packaging. This was more popular than the emergency portions, but not available in the same quantity. This led to the rumor that this chocolate was only for officers, and the unofficial designation "officer chocolate". The "officer chocolate" has now replaced the dark chocolate in the emergency rations. Stella's earlier dark chocolate was taken out of service and is no longer part of the official military rations. The manufacturer in Ticino, however, continues to produce them in the original recipe and sells them to civilian customers. Current military chocolate also contains Rice Krispies or corn flakes. In addition to the chocolate bars, the military chocolate is available for promotion purposes in the form of a neapolitan of 5 grams. The Swiss army obtains their military chocolate from various manufacturers, which are UTZ Certified, among others from the Chocolat Stella or the Chocolat Frey.

== Protected brand ==
Since 2013 the protection of the brand "Swiss Army" is to be enforced on behalf of parliament. In April 2016 the Handelsgericht Bern prohibited a chocolate manufacturer from using the brand name "Swiss Army" without a corresponding license.

== See also ==
- Swiss chocolate
- Military chocolate (United States)
