= Entlebuch railway station =

Railway station in Entlebuch, Switzerland

Entlebuch
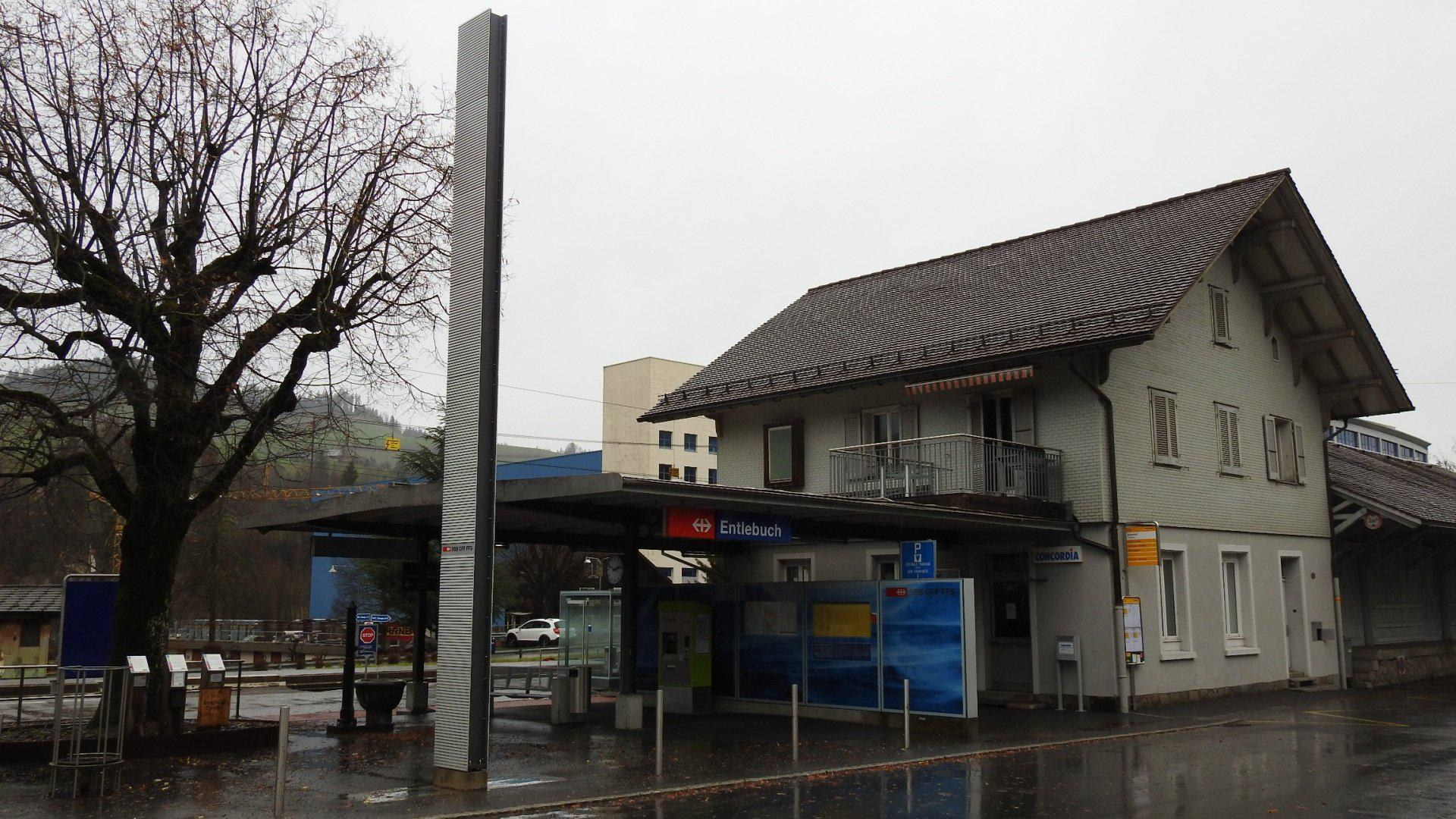
- The station building in 2018

General information
- Location: Entlebuch; Switzerland
- Coordinates: 46°59′37″N 8°03′44″E
- Elevation: 684 m (2,244 ft)
- Owner: Swiss Federal Railways
- Line: Bern–Lucerne line
- Platforms: 2 side platform
- Tracks: 3
- Train operators: BLS AG
- Connections: PostAuto AG buses

Construction
- Parking: Yes (28 spaces)
- Cycle facilities: Yes (18 spaces)
- Accessible: No

Other information
- Station code: 8508213 (ENT)
- Fare zone: 43 (Passepartout)

Passengers
- 2023: 910 per weekday (BLS)

Services
Preceding station	Lucerne S-Bahn	Following station
Hasle LU towards Langnau i.E.	S6	Wolhusen towards Lucerne
Preceding station	BLS	Following station
Schüpfheim towards Bern	RE7	Wolhusen towards Lucerne
Location

Entlebuch railway station (German: Bahnhof Entlebuch) is a railway station in the municipality of Entlebuch, in the Swiss canton of Lucerne. It is an intermediate stop on the standard gauge Bern–Lucerne line of Swiss Federal Railways.

== Services ==
As of the December 2024 timetable change, the following services stop at Entlebuch:

- RegioExpress/Lucerne S-Bahn S6: half-hourly service between Langnau i.E. and Lucerne, with every other train continuing from Langnau i.E. to Bern.

== Gallery ==
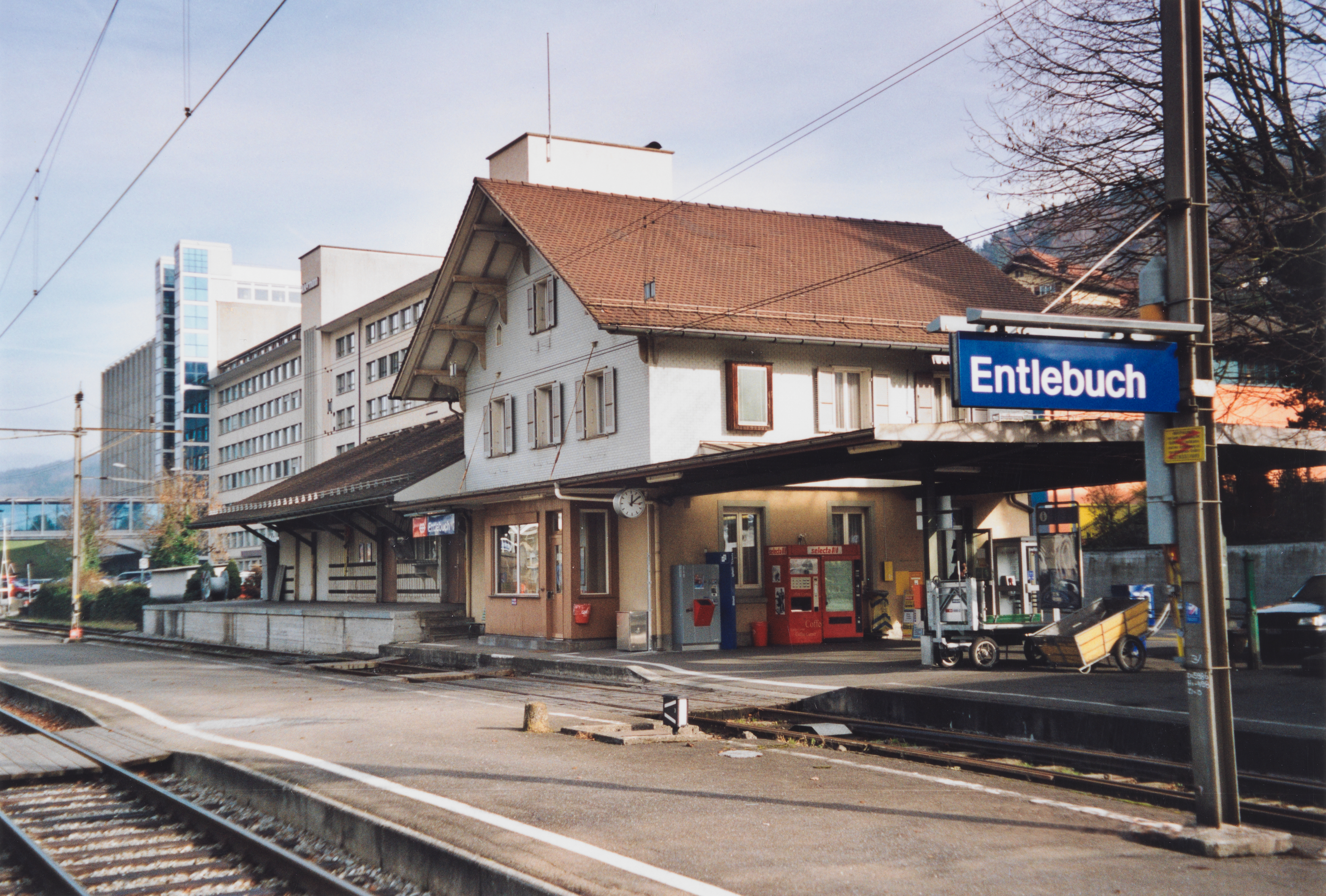
Station building in 2004
