= Georges Huber =

Swiss journalist (1910–2003)

Personal details
- Born: Georges Huber; 1910 Trubschachen, Switzerland
- Died: January 23, 2003 Rome, Italy
- Profession: Independent Journalist

Georges Huber (1910–2003, also known as George Huber) was a Swiss journalist who wrote many publications relating to the Catholic Church.

== Biography ==
Born at Trubschachen in Switzerland in 1910, Huber took his primary education in French and German-Swiss schools. He then went to Paris, where he received his doctorate in political, social and economic sciences as well as a license in international sciences. At the Catholic University in Paris, he did post-graduate work in philosophy and took courses with Etienne Gilson at the College de France.

Huber was the correspondent in Rome of a number of French, German, Canadian and Italian publications. He interrupted his work in Rome for a period during the Second World War, when he returned to his native Switzerland to work in the Economic War Administration at Basel.

Huber lived in Rome, where he spoke 7 languages and worked as a journalist with his wife Marie-Thérèse, whom he married in 1946. Both were members of the third order Carmelites. One of the publications Huber wrote for was the French La Croix.

Before his death in Rome in 2003, Huber authored no less than 15 books on current events in religious matters.

Huber wrote about the famous Prayer to St. Michael in Arrière, Satan! Le diable aujourd'hui. This text was quoted in its Italian version in an article available through the publication Zenit.

Huber also appeared to have an interest in the Society of St. Pius X and Archbishop Marcel Lefebvre, having written a number of articles on this matter.

== Publications ==
- Vers une paix juste et durable : Les messages de Noël de S. S. Pie XII (1944)
- Discours aux jeunes époux (1947–1955)
- Discours aux jeunes époux. 1, 1re et 2me année de pontificat, 2 mars 1939 - 1er mars 1941 (1955)
- Le Cardinal reçoit toujours! (1959)
- My Door is Always Open (1959)
- Vers le Concile : Dialogues sous la colonnade de Saint-Pierre (1961)
- Vers l'union des chrétiens : nouveaux entretiens sous la colonnade de Saint-Pierre (1962)
- Paul VI (1963)
- Paul VI, esquisse biographique et psychologique (1963)
- Laïcs... et saints ? : dans la lumière de Vatican I (1967, with Marie-Thérèse Huber & Jean Guitton)
- Pilgrim of Peace (1967)
- Mon ange marchera devant toi (1970) (English: My Angel Will Go Before You—1983)
- Le bras de Dieu : pour une vision chrétienne de l'histoire (1976)
- Jean-Paul Ier : ou, la Vocation de Jean-Baptiste (1979)
- Dio è Signore della storia : per una visione cristiana della storia (1982, with Mariella Crespi Barattini)
- Le père Marie-Eugène de l'Enfant-Jésus, o.c.d., ou, L'Audace de la foi (1987)
- Arrière, Satan! Le diable aujourd'hui (1992)
- Un témoin de la foi : le Père Marie-Eugène (1994)
- Nicholas Wolf (1995)
- Un témoin du Christ au pays des mille dieux (1998)
- Le cours des événements : hasard ou providence (2001)

== Articles ==
- Avant la conférence de Mgr Lefebvre à Rome, remous dans la noblesse : l'ex-roi d'Italie intervient
- Pour le règlement de l'affaire d'Ecône : une lettre du pape
- Le pape approuve la Fraternité Saint-Pierre
- Idées saugrenues. (Réconciliation Vatican- Ecône?)
- En marge de l'affaire d'Ecône, les leçons d'un douloureux conflit
- Mgr Lefebvre débouté à Rome. Vers une solution?
- Une interview de MGR Lefebvre : prêt à franchir le Rubicon
- En marge de la visite canonique du séminaire d'Ecône : vigoureuse interview du cardinal Thiandoum
- Une invitation des papes
- Le pape ne recevra pas Mgr Lefebvre
- Ecône : en marge d'un "rebondissement" : distinguer!
- Précisions du Vatican touchant l'audience accordée par le pape à Mgr lefèbvre : tant d'inexactitudes à rectifier...
- Paul VI dénonce les erreurs de Mgr Lefèbvre ainsi que les déviations des progressistes
- Les évêques allemands et Mgr Lefebvre
- Béatification de Maurice Tornay : un homme de notre temps
- Paul VI commente l'affaire d'Ecône
- Le drame d'Ecône
- Le contenu exacte de la nouvelle lettre du pape à Mgr Lefebvre
- Mgr Salina consacré évêque
- Le cardinal Ottaviani et l'affaire d'Ecône : sévère mise au point
- Un religieux valaisan nommé recteur de l'Institut pontifical Regina mundi : (P. Benoît duroux)
- Jean Paul II aux cardinaux : pour résorber le schisme d'Ecône
- Le dossier Ecône
- Au Vatican, décès du père Henri de Riedmatten : un dominicain valaisan d'intelligence et de coeur au service de l'Eglise
- Vers un règlement de l'affaire d'Ecône?
- Le centenaire d'un "scandale" : l'ascension du Mont-Rose par le pape Pie XI
- Avertissement du pape à Mgr Lefebvre
- La lettre personnelle et conciliante adressé par le Saint-Père à Mgr lefebvre le 11 octobre
- En marge de la rencontre entre le pape Paul VI et Mgr Lefebvre
- Vers l'union des chretiens : nouveaux chretiens sous la colonnade de Saint-Pierre
- Le bienheureux Maurice Tornay martyr au Tibet (1998)
