= Schüpfheim railway station =

Railway station in Schüpfheim, Switzerland

Schüpfheim
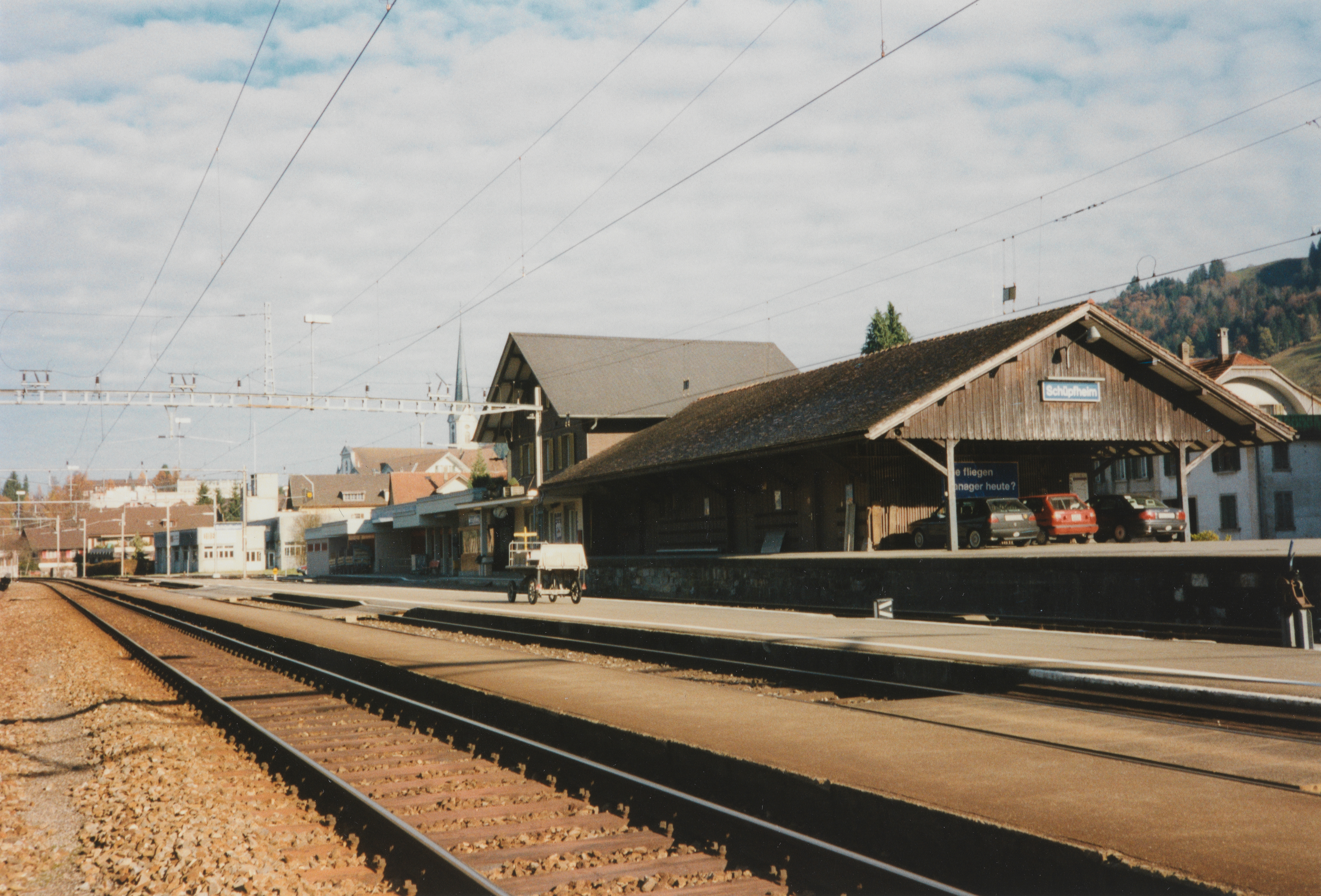
- Station building and goods shed in 2006

General information
- Location: Schüpfheim; Switzerland
- Coordinates: 46°57′02″N 8°00′54″E
- Elevation: 717 m (2,352 ft)
- Owner: Swiss Federal Railways
- Line: Bern–Lucerne line
- Platforms: 2: 1 side platform; 1 island platform
- Tracks: 4
- Train operators: BLS AG
- Connections: PostAuto AG buses

Construction
- Parking: Yes (66 spaces)
- Cycle facilities: Yes (210 spaces)
- Accessible: Yes

Other information
- Station code: 8508211 (SCHH)
- Fare zone: 53 (Passepartout)

Passengers
- 2023: 1'700 per weekday (BLS)

Services
Preceding station	Lucerne S-Bahn	Following station
Escholzmatt towards Langnau i.E.	S6	Hasle LU towards Lucerne
Preceding station	BLS	Following station
Escholzmatt towards Bern	RE7	Entlebuch towards Lucerne
Location

Schüpfheim railway station (German: Bahnhof Schüpfheim) is a railway station in the municipality of Schüpfheim, in the Swiss canton of Lucerne. It is an intermediate stop on the standard gauge Bern–Lucerne line of Swiss Federal Railways.

== Services ==
As of the December 2024 timetable change, the following services stop at Schüpfheim:

- RegioExpress/Lucerne S-Bahn S6: half-hourly service between Langnau i.E. and Lucerne, with every other train continuing from Langnau i.E. to Bern.

== Gallery ==
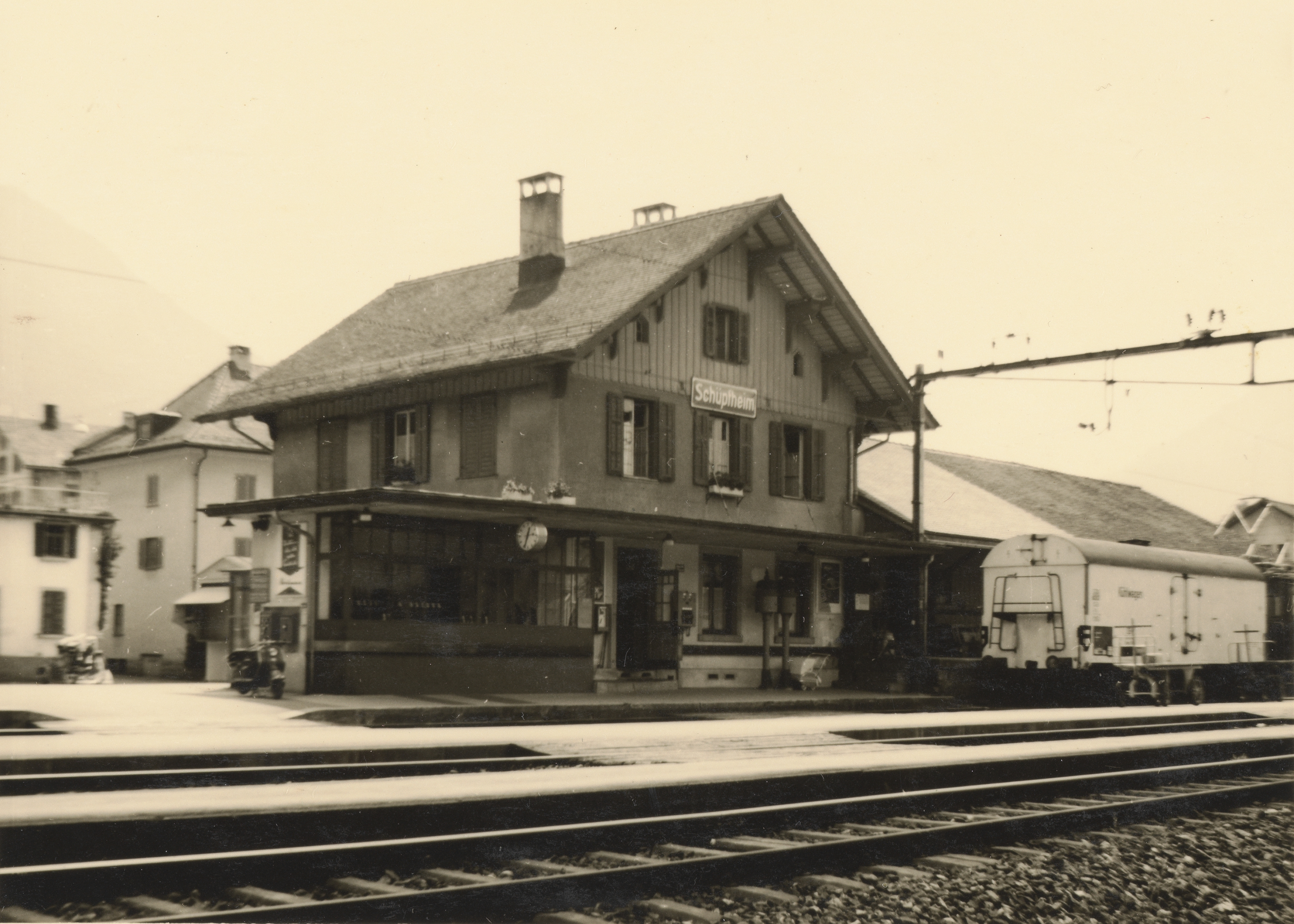
station building, undated (pre-1979)

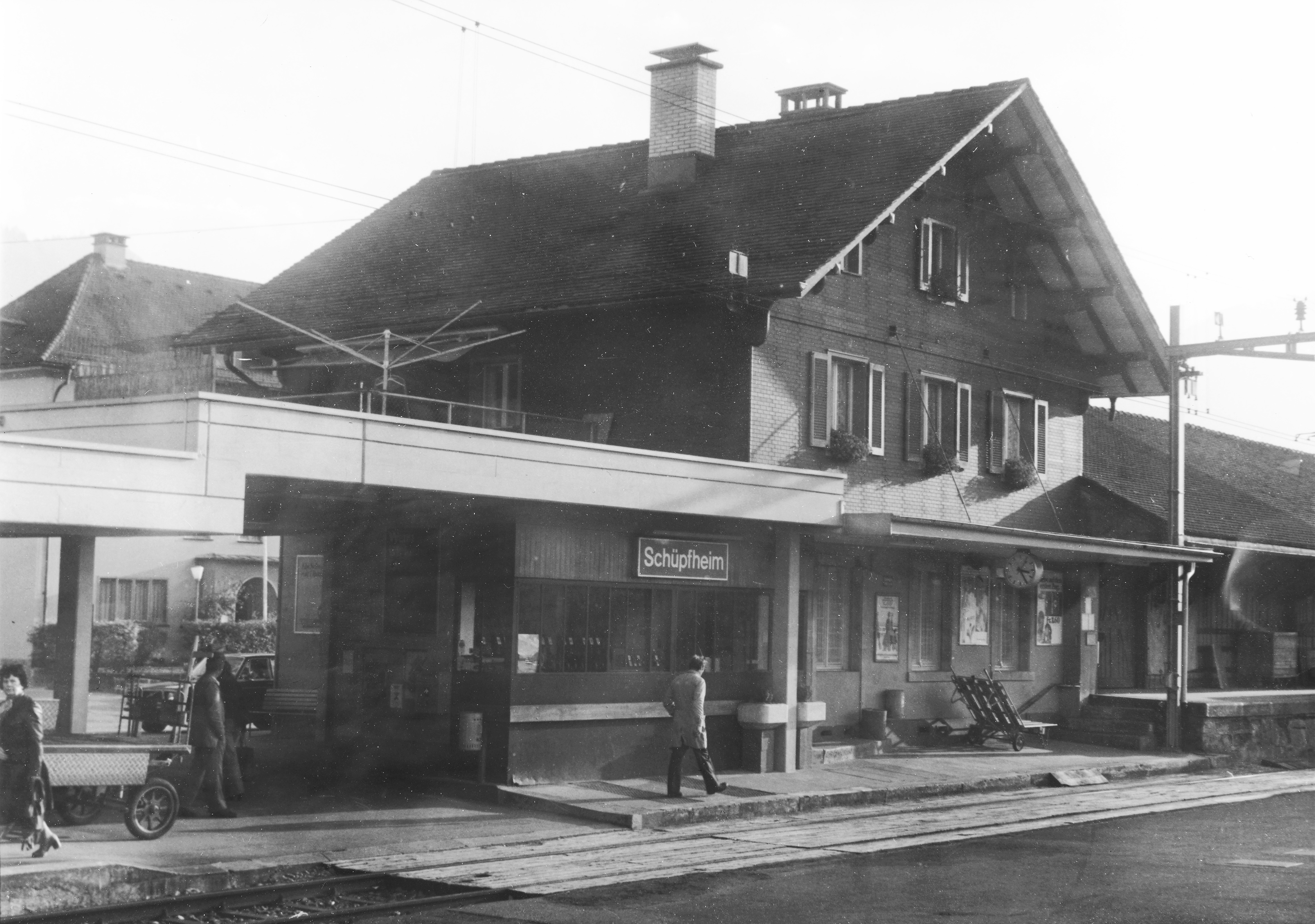
station building, 1979

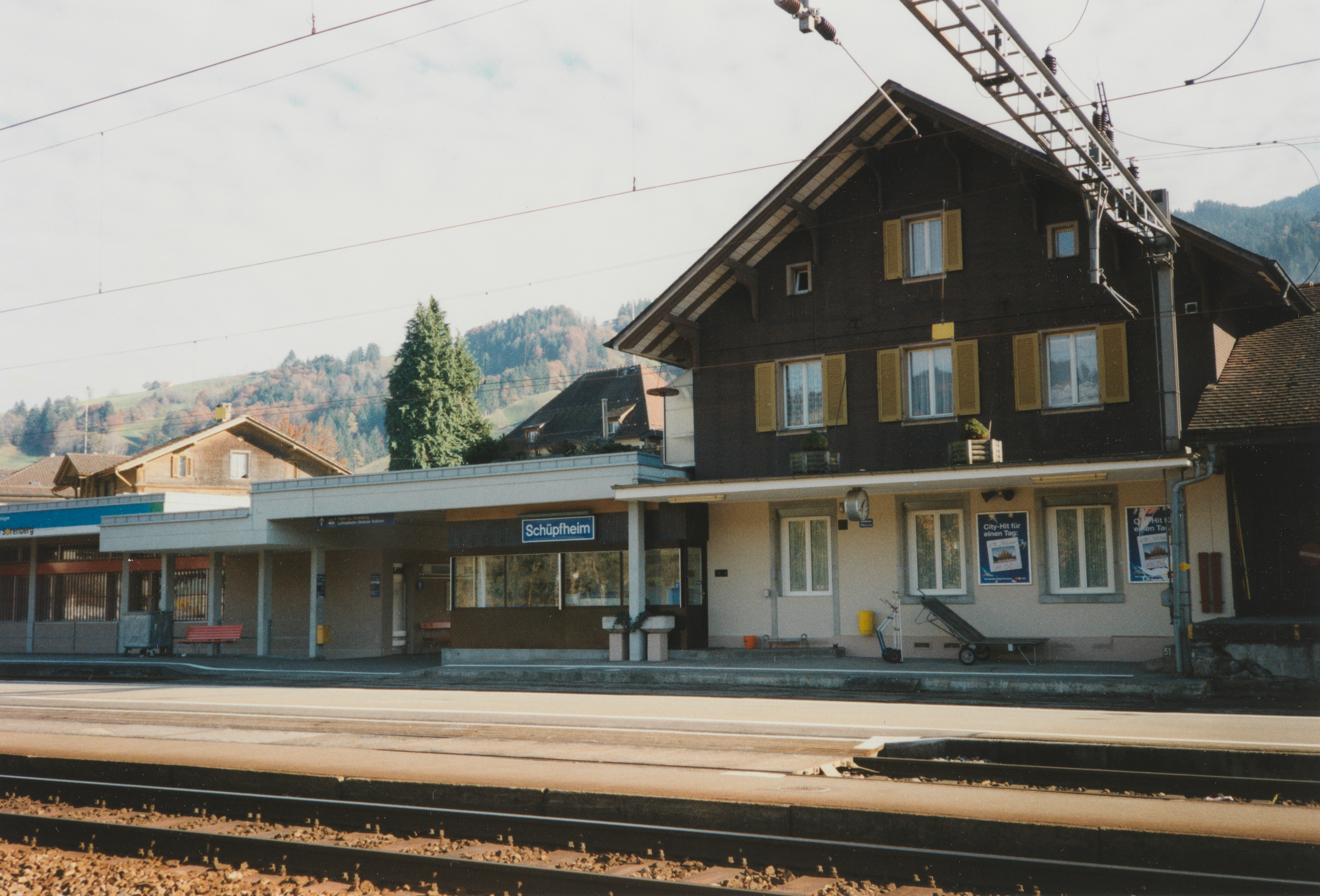
station building, 1997

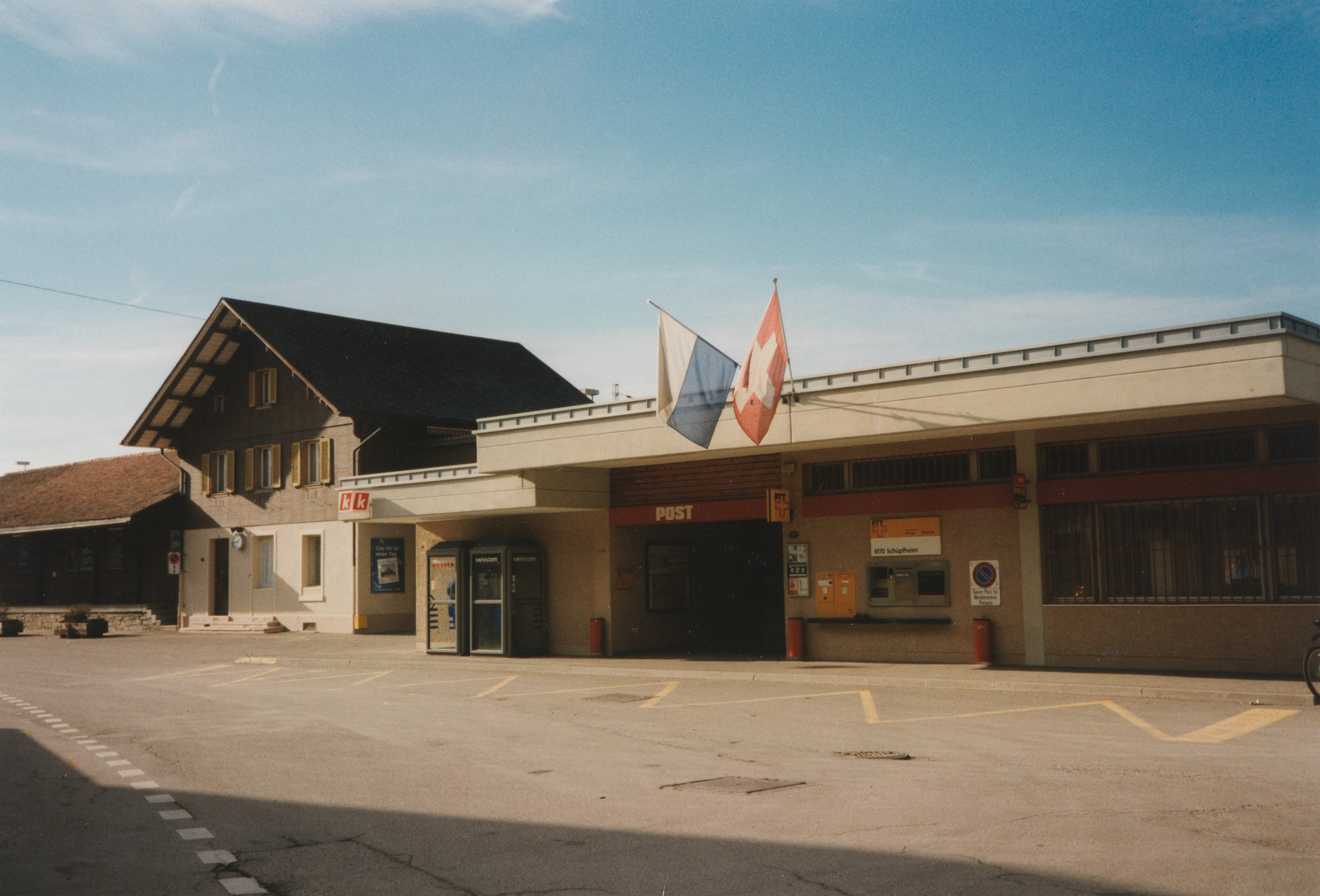
station building, 2006
