= Escholzmatt railway station =

Railway station in Escholzmatt, Switzerland

Escholzmatt
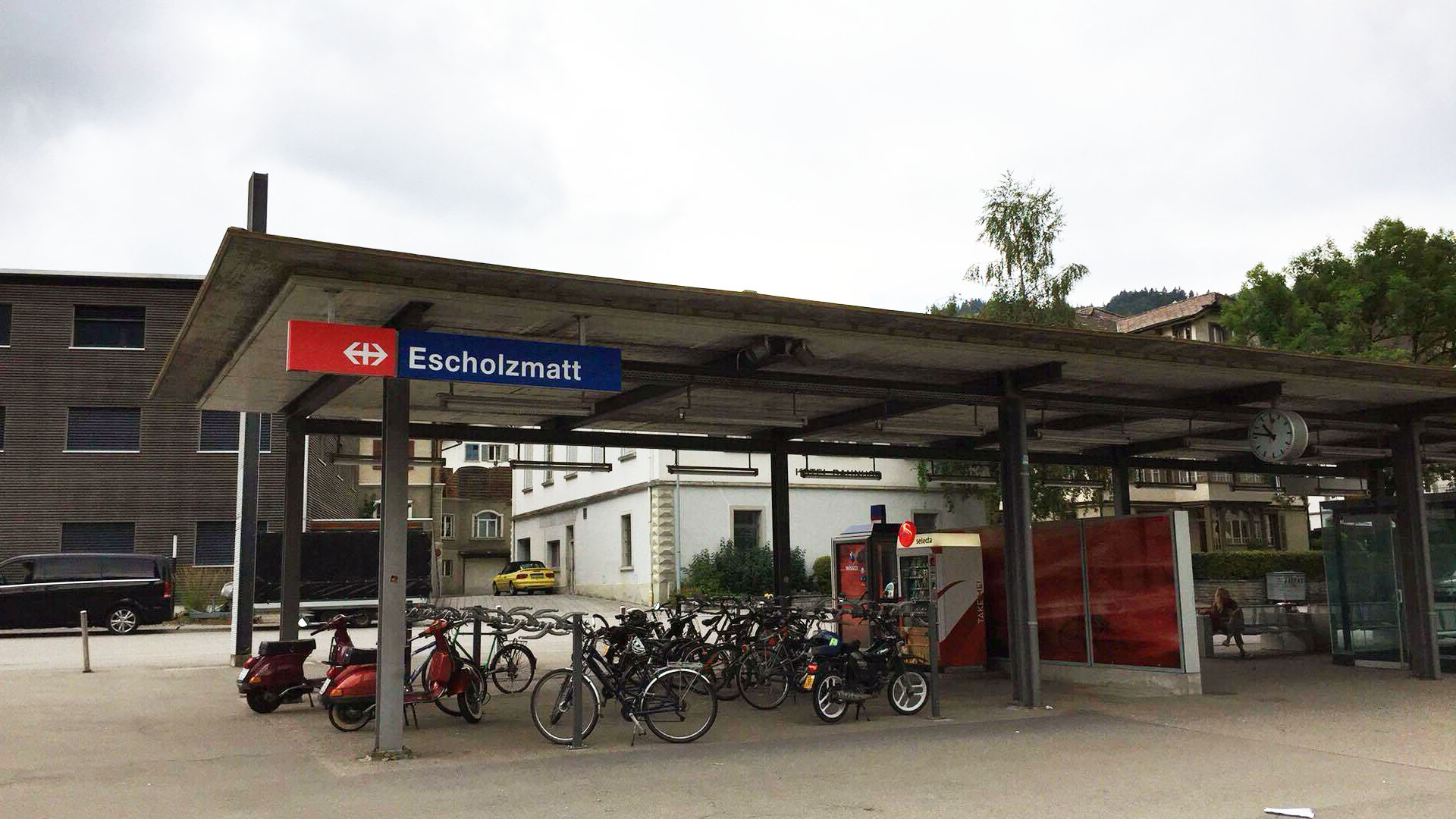
- The station platform in 2018

General information
- Location: Escholzmatt; Switzerland
- Coordinates: 46°54′55″N 7°56′11″E
- Elevation: 853 m (2,799 ft)
- Owner: Swiss Federal Railways
- Line: Bern–Lucerne line
- Platforms: 1 side platform; 1 island platform
- Tracks: 2
- Train operators: BLS AG
- Connections: PostAuto AG buses

Construction
- Parking: Yes (56 spaces)
- Cycle facilities: Yes (72 spaces)
- Accessible: No

Other information
- Station code: 8508210 (ESCH)
- Fare zone: 63 (Passepartout)

Passengers
- 2023: 990 per weekday (BLS)

Services
Preceding station	Lucerne S-Bahn	Following station
Trubschachen towards Langnau i.E.	S6	Schüpfheim towards Lucerne
Preceding station	BLS	Following station
Trubschachen towards Bern	RE7	Schüpfheim towards Lucerne
Location

Escholzmatt railway station (German: Bahnhof Escholzmatt) is a railway station in the municipality of Escholzmatt, in the Swiss canton of Lucerne. It is an intermediate stop on the standard gauge Bern–Lucerne line of Swiss Federal Railways.

== History ==
Between January 2025 and December 2025 the station's infrastructure will be upgraded. Two new side platforms will be built at a height of 55 centimetres (22 in) and at a length of 220 metres (720 ft) to permit barrier-free boarding. Platform lighting, loud speakers and clocks will be constructed. The tracks and junctions at the station will be also replaced and upgraded.

== Services ==
As of the December 2024 timetable change, the following services stop at Escholzmatt:

- RegioExpress/Lucerne S-Bahn S6: half-hourly service between Langnau i.E. and Lucerne, with every other train continuing from Langnau i.E. to Bern.

== Gallery ==
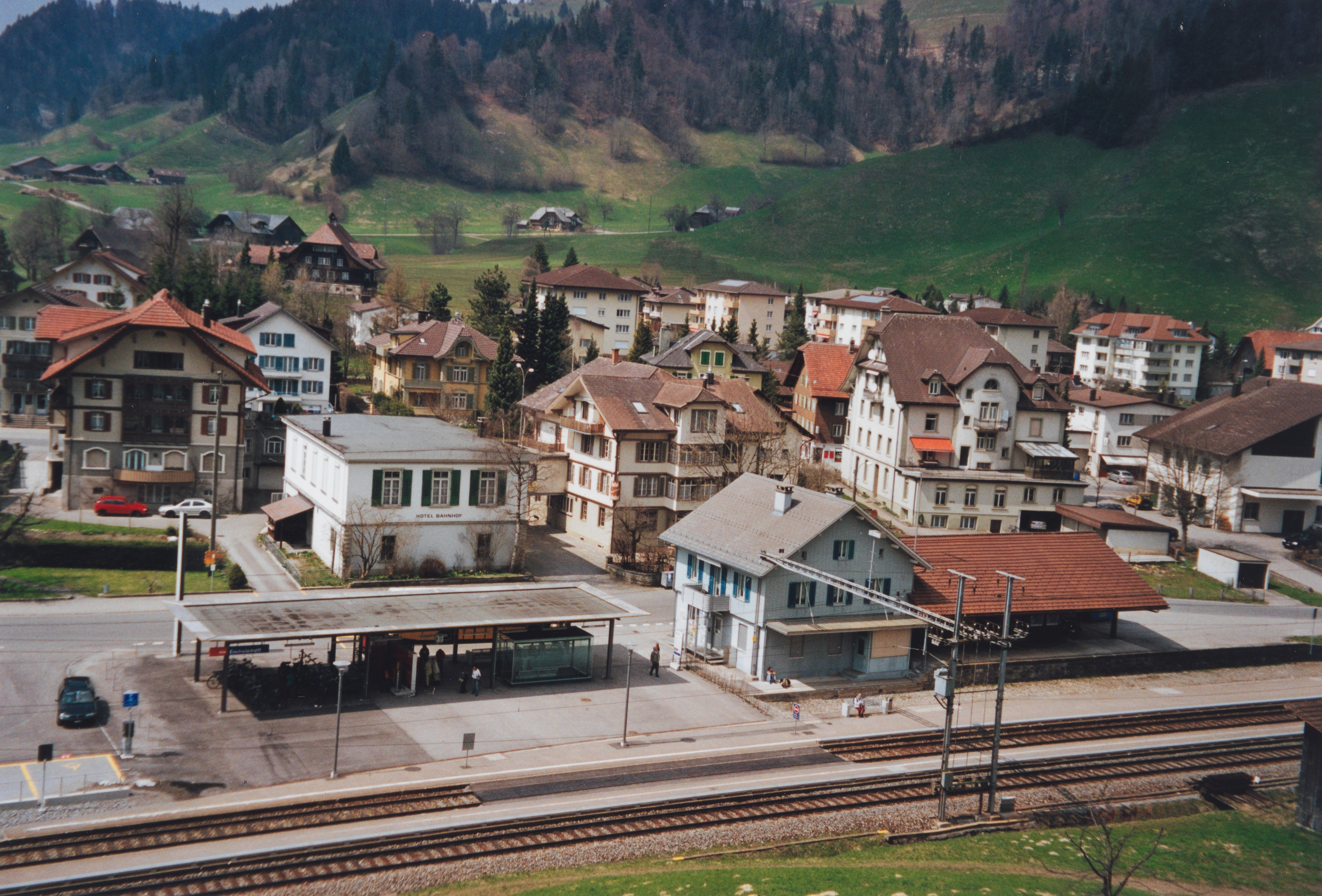
Station in 2006, general view from above

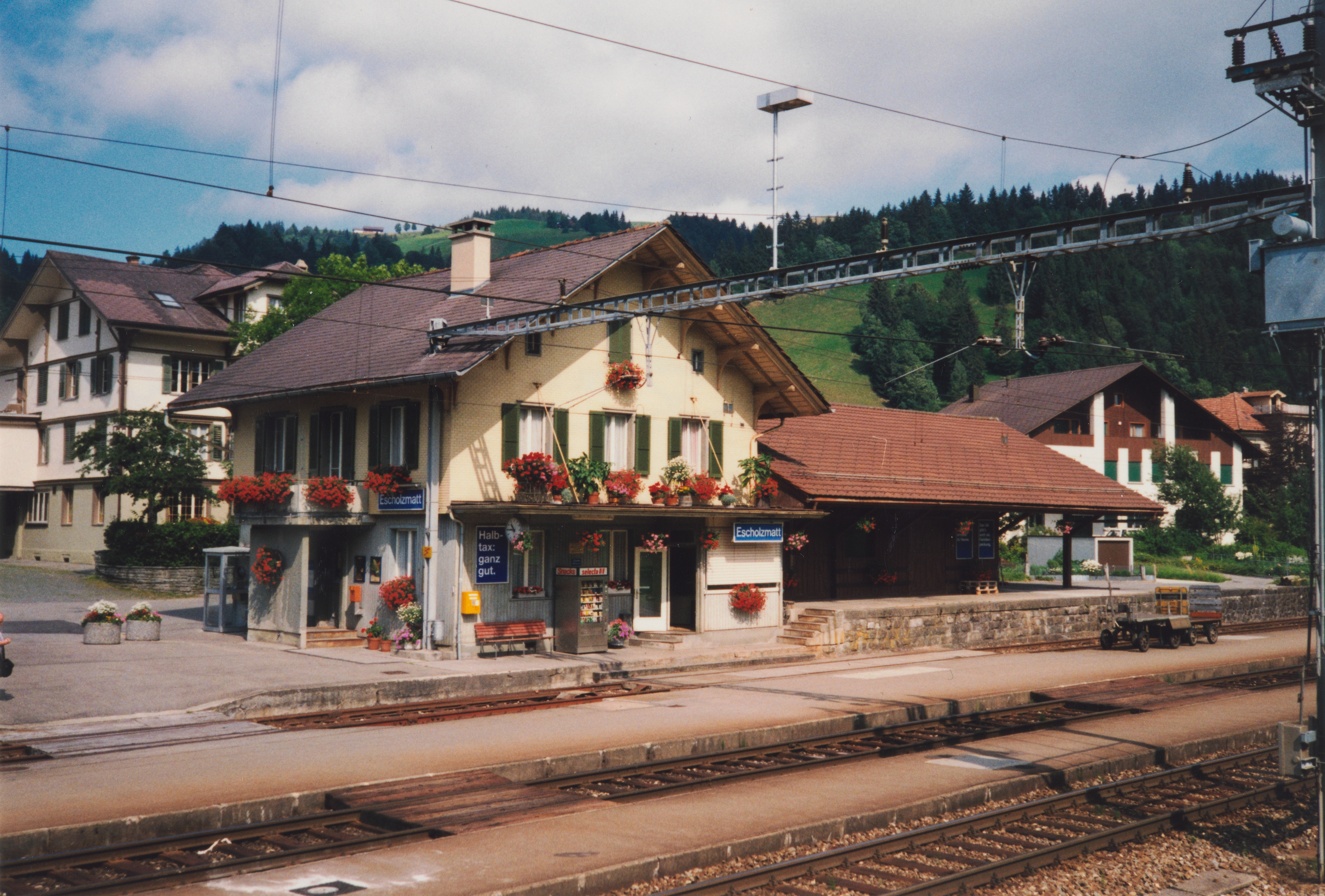
Station in 1995, train-side

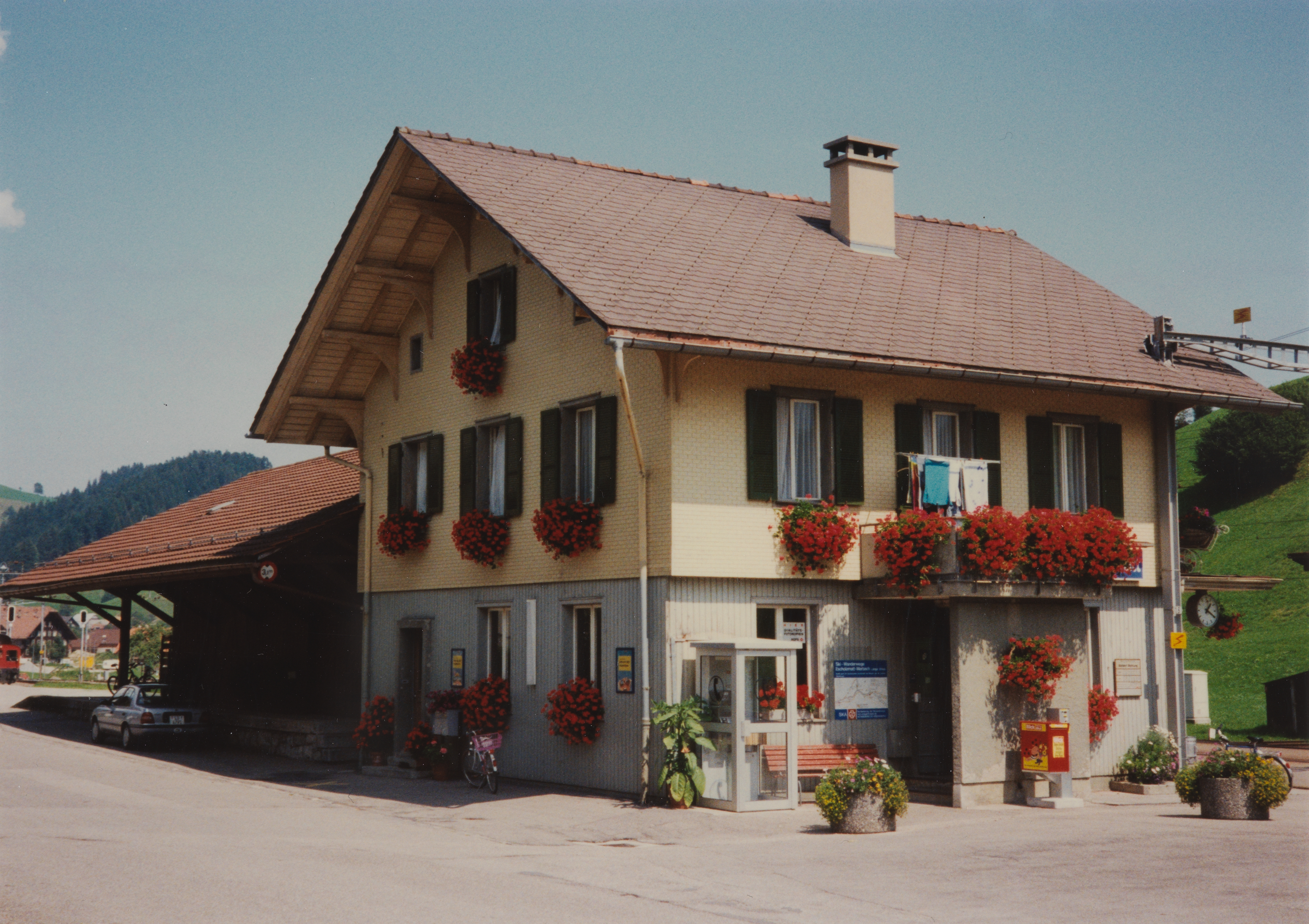
Station in 1993, street-side
