= Oscar Kambly =

Swiss businessman

- Born: Oscar Robert Kambly; 29 March 1887; Kanderbrück, Frutigen, Bern, Switzerland
- Died: 13 December 1957 (aged 70); Trubschachen, Bern, Switzerland
- Occupations: Businessman, biscuit manufacturer
- Known for: Founding and leading Kambly
- Spouse: Emma Jakob (m. 1913)
- Children: 1

Oscar Robert Kambly (né Kambli; 29 March 1887 – 13 December 1957) was a Swiss industrialist and businessman who founded Kambly, a major Swiss biscuit manufacturing company, in 1910.

== Early life and education ==
Kambly was born 29 March 1887 in Kanderbrück, a small hamlet, which belonged to Frutigen, Switzerland in the Bernese Oberland, the youngest of eight children, to Johann Karl Kambli (1846–1919), a fire wood manufacturer, and Anna Margaritha (née Stoller; born 1848), into a family of modest means. He had seven siblings of which the oldest where born in Cernay, Haut-Rhin and two brothers emigrated to Michigan and Illinois.

His paternal grandparents, originally being from Zurich, emigrated to Cernay at the beginning of the 19th century, fleeing religious persecution being Anabaptist. They would later return to Switzerland. Oscar and his older brothers Arnold and Paul changed the spelling from Kambli to Kambly for the Bernese line of descendants, however the family place of origin remains Zurich.

Kambly attended the local public schools followed by a year learning French in Villeneuve, Vaud. There was introduced to his wife Emma Jakob (born 1889), who was originally from Trubschachen, and to where he followed her. Initially, he completed an apprenticeship as baker confectioner at the local bakery owned by Fritz Waelti.

== Career ==
In 1909, after getting experienced in his trade, while working in Zürich, Basel and Stuttgart (then Grand Duchy of Baden), he took-over the bakery of his former master Fritz Wälti. Since 1911, the company was known as Kambly Brothers, after his elder brother Paul Ernst Kambly (1883-1976) got involved in the company.

During the next years, he expanded the company gradually from a small bakery and confectionary shop into a global player of biscuit manufacturing. In 1922, Kambly co-founded the soft cheese producer E. Baer & Co. in Küssnacht am Rigi, which was ultimately sold to Lactalis, a French dairy concern. In 1925, he acquired the Blausee Estate on Blausee in the Bernese Oberland. Since 1953, the company was turned into a family-owned stock corporation.

== Personal life ==
In 1913, Kambly married Emma Jakob, from Trubschachen. They had one son:

- Oscar Jakob Kambly II (1914–1998), who inherited Kambly and was also a patron of the arts. His eldest daughter, Theres Kambly, would marry Dr. Bernard A. Siegfried (1934–2017), who was chairman of the Siegfried concern, of Zofingen, Switzerland. They had two children. Oscar II's son, Oscar Kambly III, has taken-over the family business.

Kambly died 13 December 1957 in Trubschachen aged 70.

== Literature ==
- Martin Clausen; 100 Jahre Kambly - eine wahre Liebesgeschichte Stämpfli Gruppe AG (2010) (in German)
- Ursula Kambly-Kallen: Das Kambly-Bretzeli. Stämpfli Verlag, Bern, 2007 (in German)
