= Hasle LU railway station =

Railway station in Halse, Canton of Lucerne, Switzerland

Hasle LU
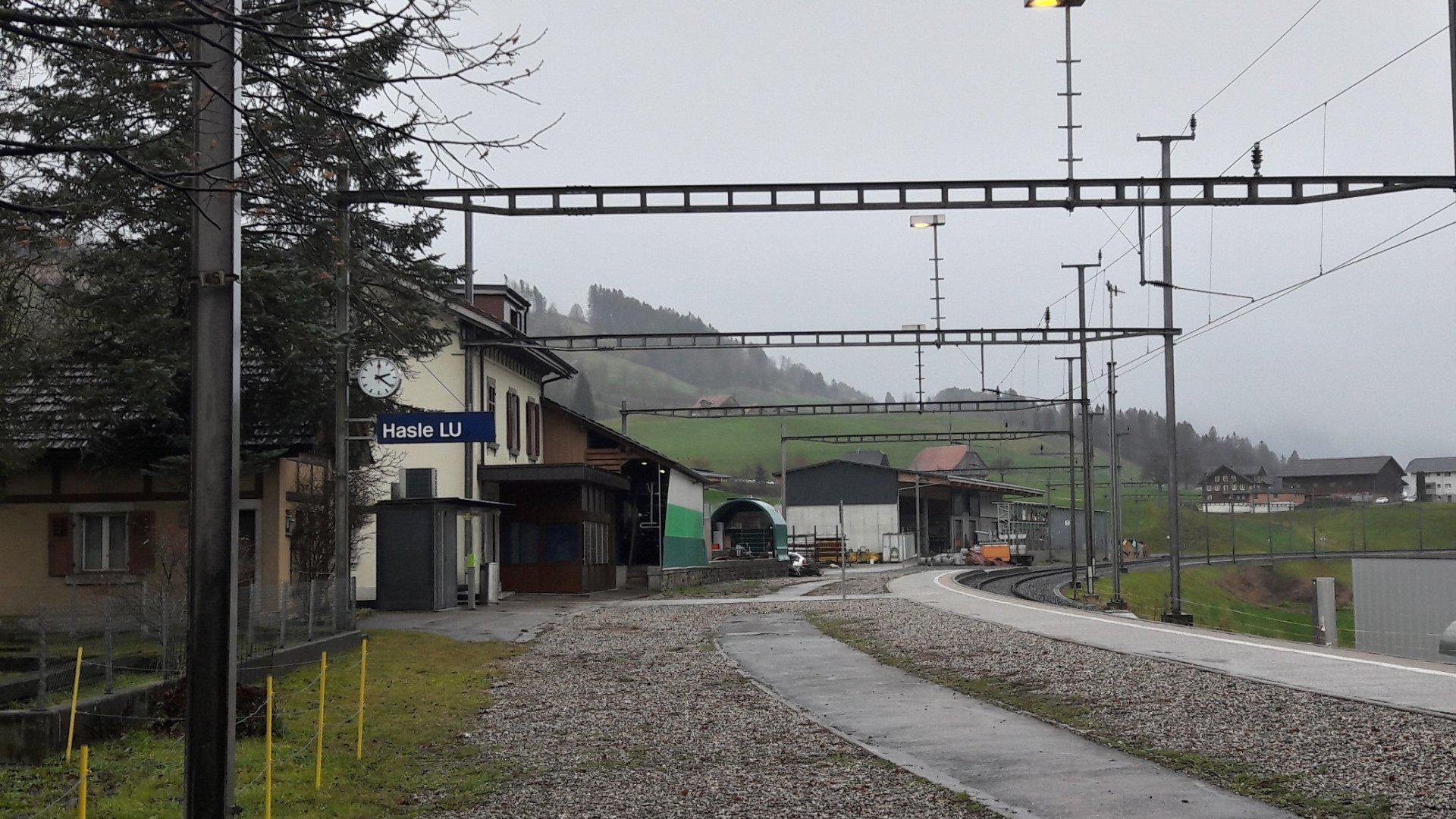
- The station in 2018

General information
- Location: Hasle; Switzerland
- Coordinates: 46°58′41″N 8°02′49″E
- Elevation: 695 m (2,280 ft)
- Owner: Swiss Federal Railways
- Line: Bern–Lucerne line
- Platforms: 1 side platform
- Tracks: 1
- Train operators: BLS AG
- Connections: PostAuto AG buses

Construction
- Parking: Yes (6 spaces)
- Accessible: Yes

Other information
- Station code: 8508212 (HAS)
- Fare zone: 43 (Passepartout)

Passengers
- 2023: 150 per weekday (BLS)

Services
Preceding station	Lucerne S-Bahn	Following station
Schüpfheim towards Langnau i.E.	S6	Entlebuch towards Lucerne
Location

Hasle LU railway station (German: Bahnhof Hasle LU) is a railway station in the municipality of Hasle, in the Swiss canton of Lucerne. It is an intermediate stop on the standard gauge Bern–Lucerne line of Swiss Federal Railways.

== Services ==
As of the December 2024 timetable change, the following services stop at Hasle LU:

- Lucerne S-Bahn S6: hourly service between Langnau i.E. and Lucerne.

== Gallery ==
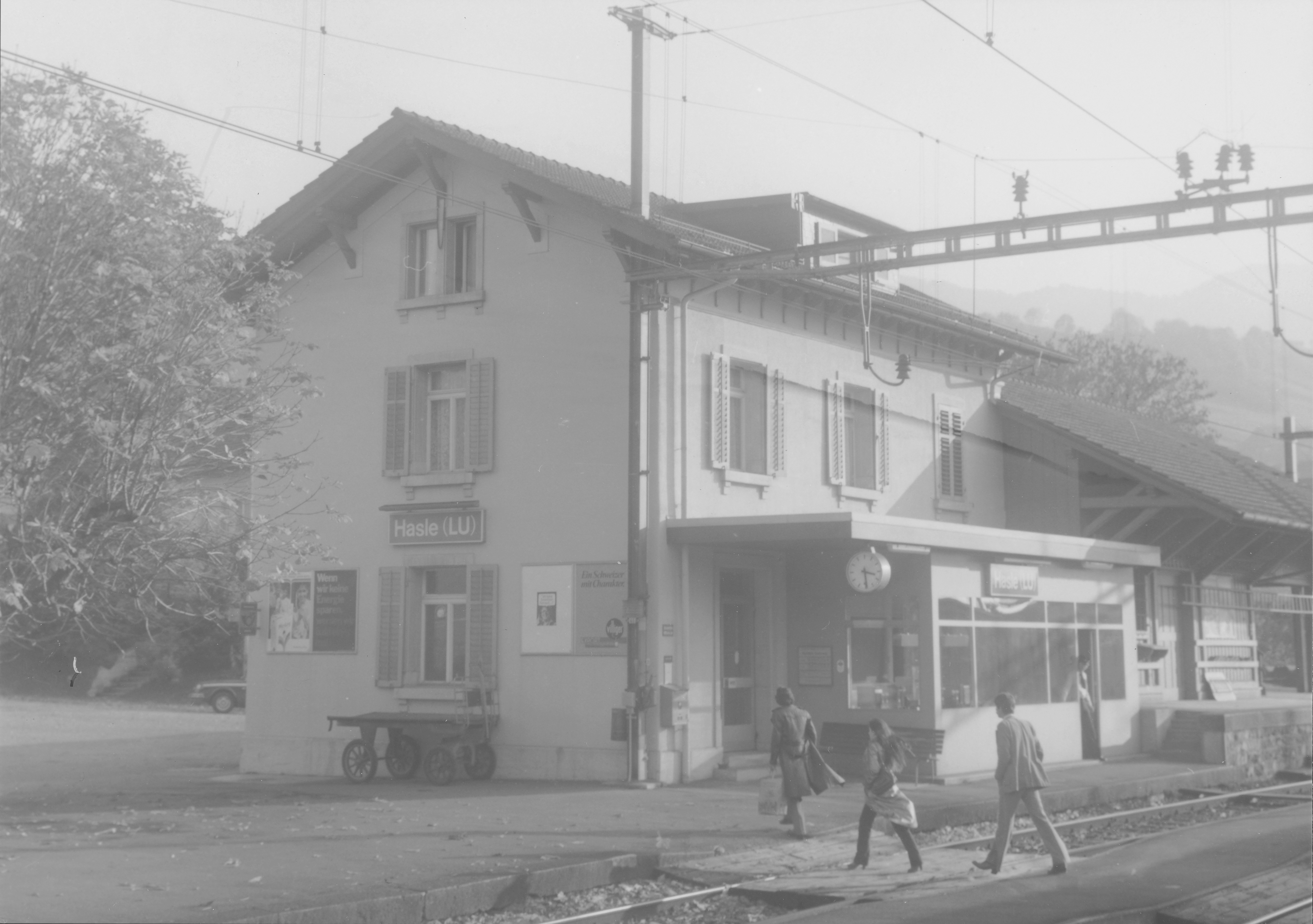
Station in 1979

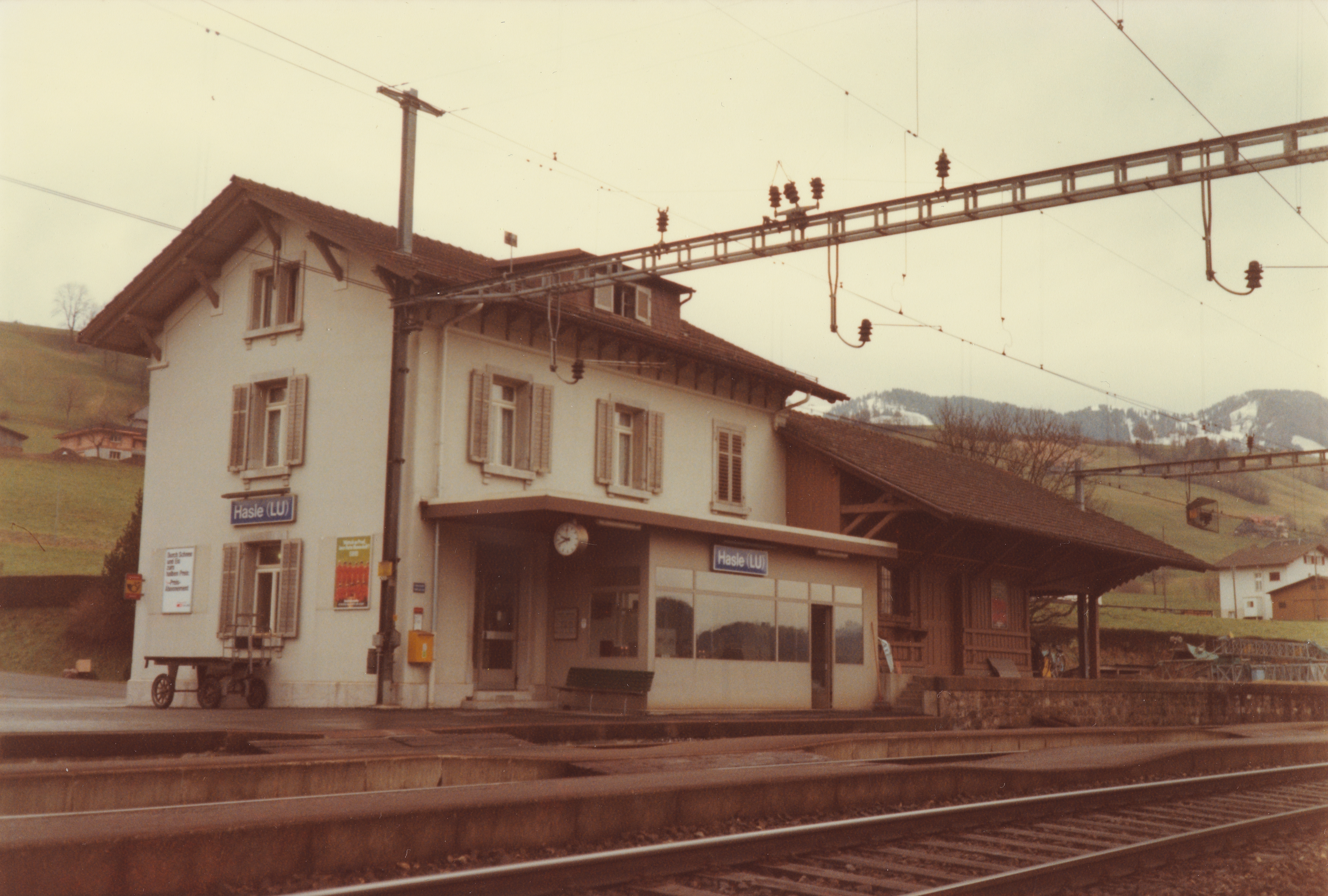
Station in 1983

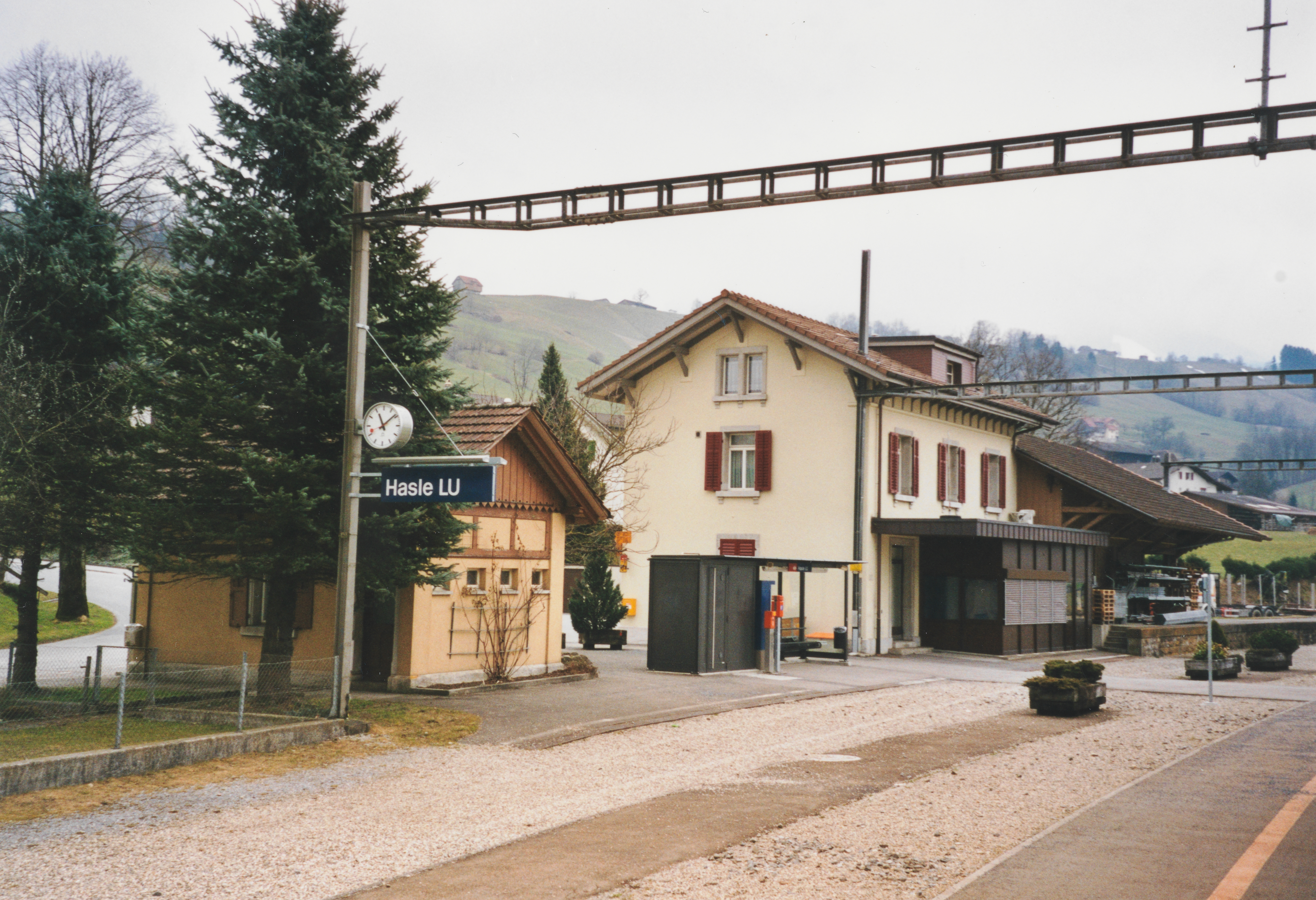
Station in 2003
