= Military biscuit =

Biscuit issued in the Swiss military

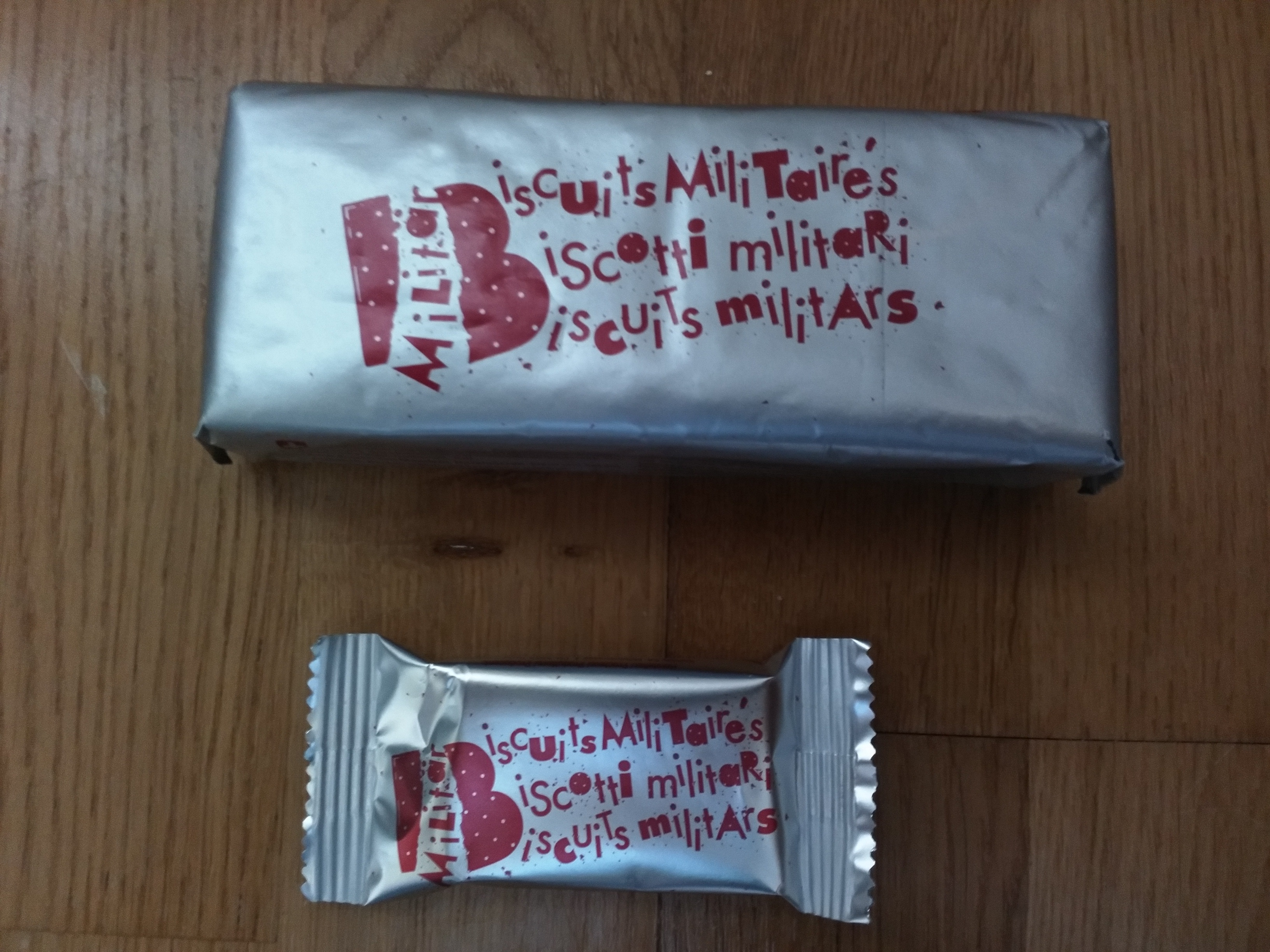
Militärbiscuits Standard packaging and Small packaging

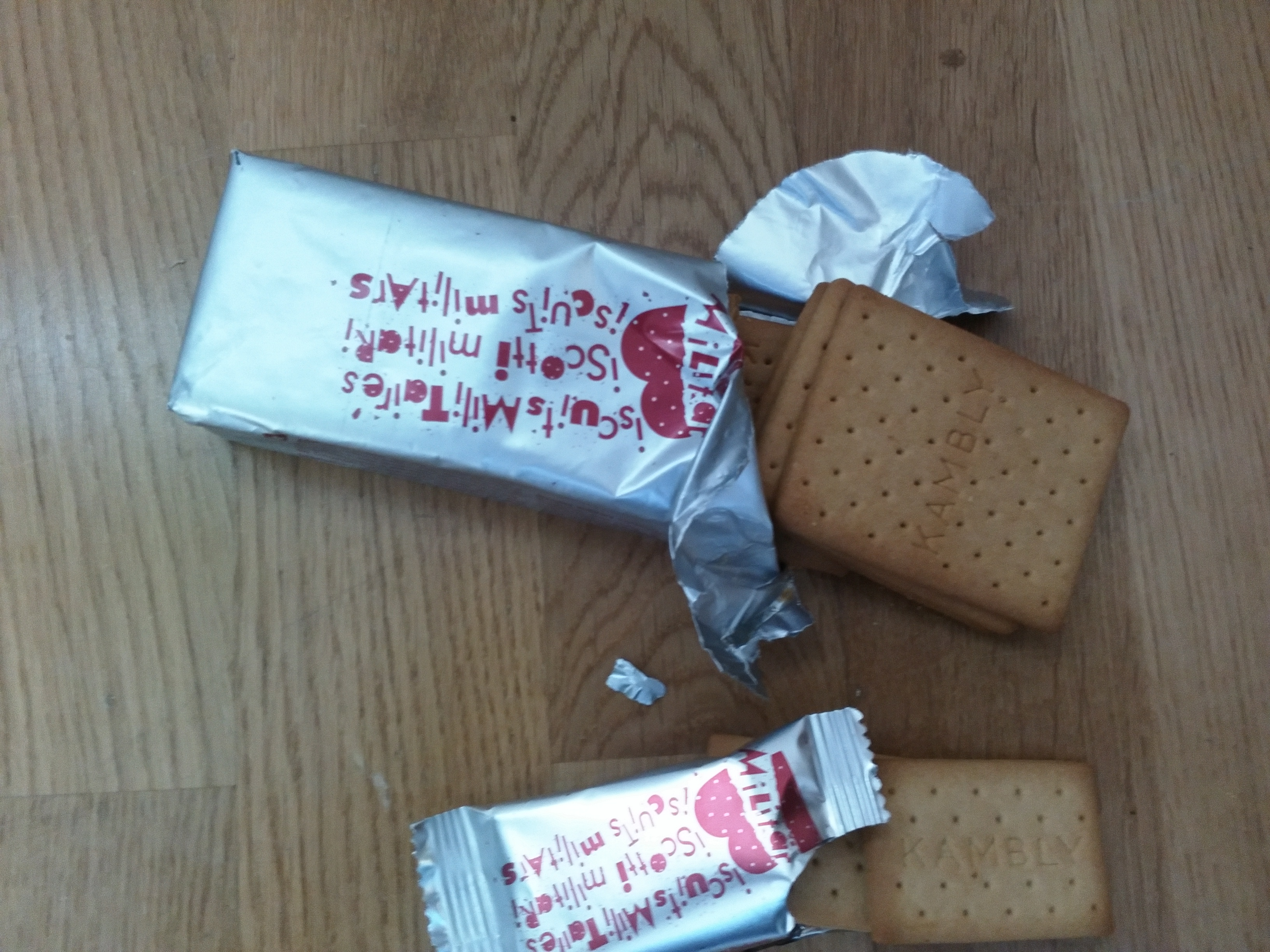
Open packaging

The military biscuit (German: Militärbiscuit; French: biscuits militaires; Italian: biscotti militari; Romansh: biscuits militars;) is a food component of the Swiss army.

== History ==
Oscar J. Kambly, the second-generation boss of the traditional swiss company Kambly SA, developed the recipe for flavor-neutral pastries in 1959. It was to replace the military Zwieback known as Bundesziegel in German language (federal brick) and should be compatible with cheese or sausage as well as with chocolate. It should have a shelf life of at least three years. Since 1959, the army has distributed about a million servings of the military biscuits to the soldiers every year. The military biscuits are also popular by the civilian population of Switzerland.

Some private traders sold military biscuits, which the DDPS initially wanted to prevent, because the trade with army food is forbidden. This is also noted on the packaging. Since 2010, Kambly, still a manufacturer of military biscuits, is allowed to sell these to large distributors. The packaging has to be different from the biscuits produced for the military.

Since 2009, the biscuits have also been distributed together with the military chocolate in a gift box with the dedication of the Chief of the Armed Forces to the soldiers who have fulfilled their military service obligations. 25,000 such gift boxes include the recurring yearly production for a year's release for the soldiers in Switzerland.

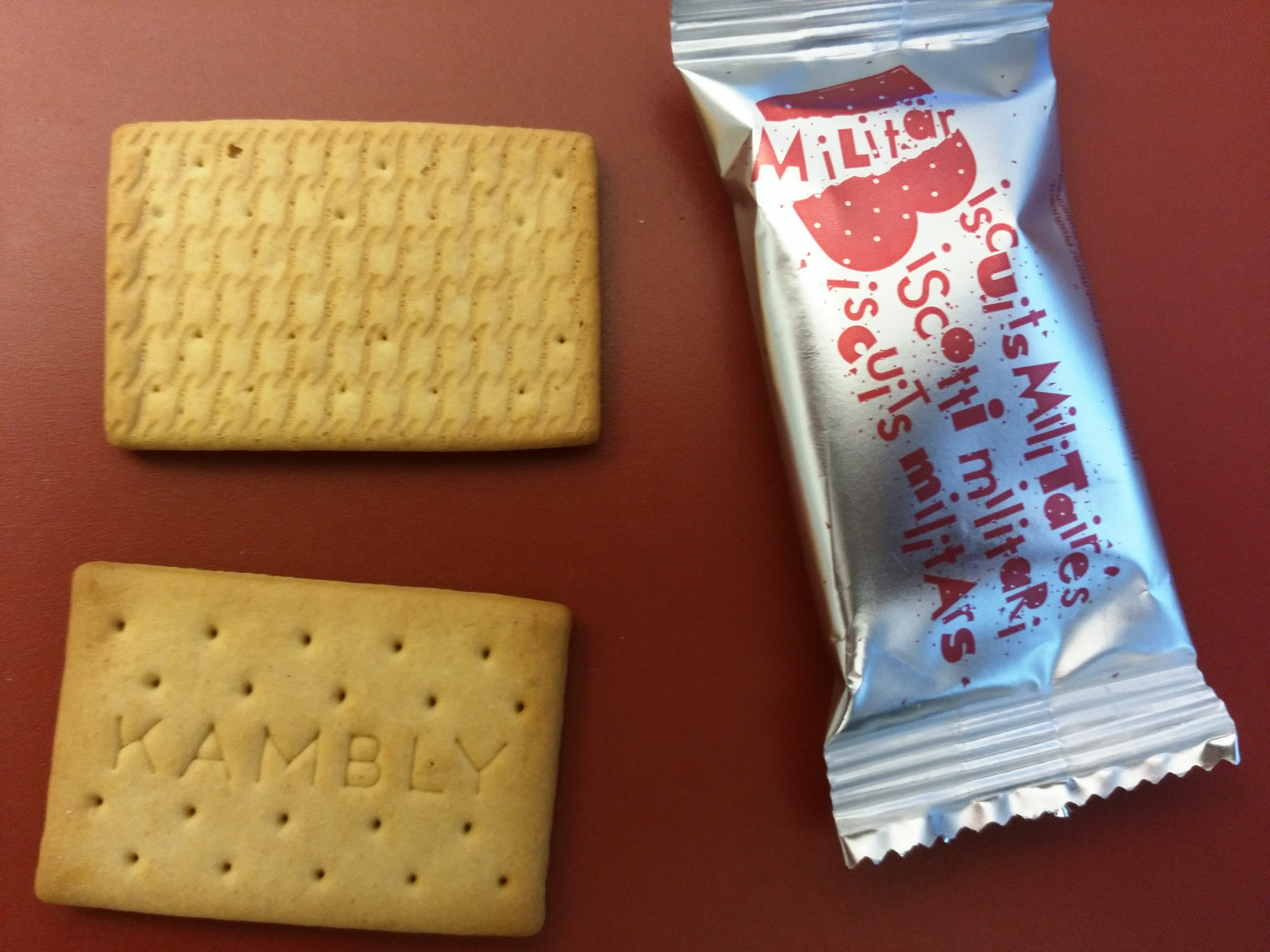
Smale Militärbiscuits Package and both sides

In addition to the standard packaging, the Military Biscuit is also available as promotional merchandise with two pieces packed to a 9g small packaging.

== Ingredients and nutritional values ==
Ingredients

- Wheat flour, potato starch, palm oil, glucose, sugar, powdered milk, malt, leavening agent, sodium hydrogencarbonate, ammonium bicarbonate, salt.

Nutritional values per 100 grams

- 450 kilo Calorie
- 14 grams of fat
- 73 grams of carbohydrates
- 15 grams of which sugars
- 6.9 grams of protein
- 1.9 grams of salt
