= Trubschachen =

- Municipality
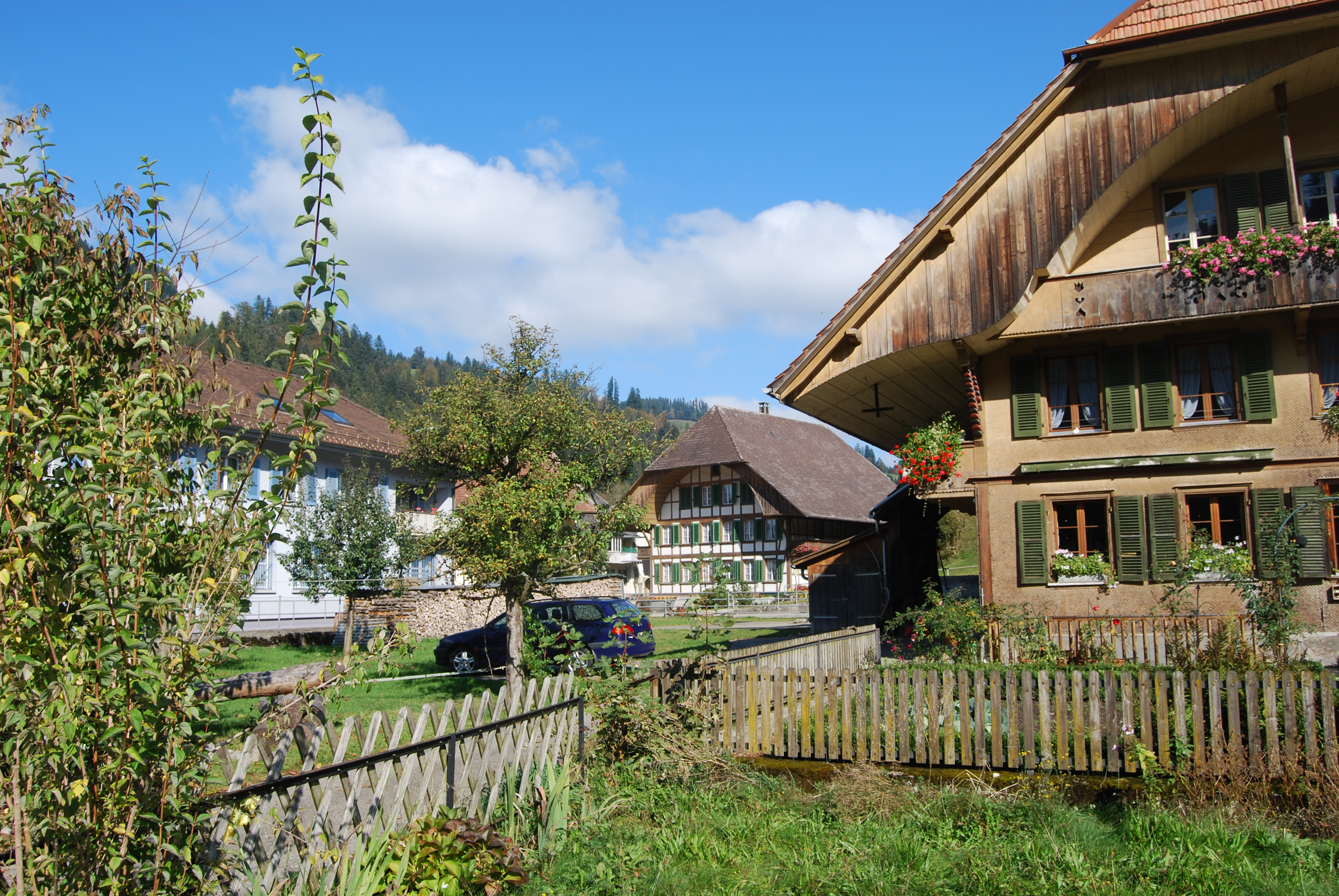
- Trubschachen village

- Flag Coat of arms
- Location of Trubschachen
- Location within Switzerland Location within Canton of Bern
- Coordinates: 46°55′N 7°51′E
- Country: Switzerland
- Canton: Bern
- District: Emmental

Government
  - Executive: Gemeinderat with 7 members
  - Mayor: Gemeindepräsident(in); Bernhard Kunz (as of 2026)

Area
  - Total: 15.6 km^{2} (6.0 sq mi)
- Elevation: 731 m (2,398 ft)

Population (December 2020)
  - Total: 1,465
  - Density: 93.9/km^{2} (243/sq mi)
- Time zone: UTC+01:00 (CET)
  - Summer (DST): UTC+02:00 (CEST)
- Postal code: 3555
- SFOS number: 909
- ISO 3166 code: CH-BE
- Surrounded by: Eggiwil, Langnau im Emmental, Trub
- Twin towns: Strmilov (Czech Republic), Midway, Utah (United States)
- Website: www.trubschachen.ch

Trubschachen (High Alemannic: Truebschache) is a municipality in the administrative district of Emmental in the canton of Bern in Switzerland.

== History ==
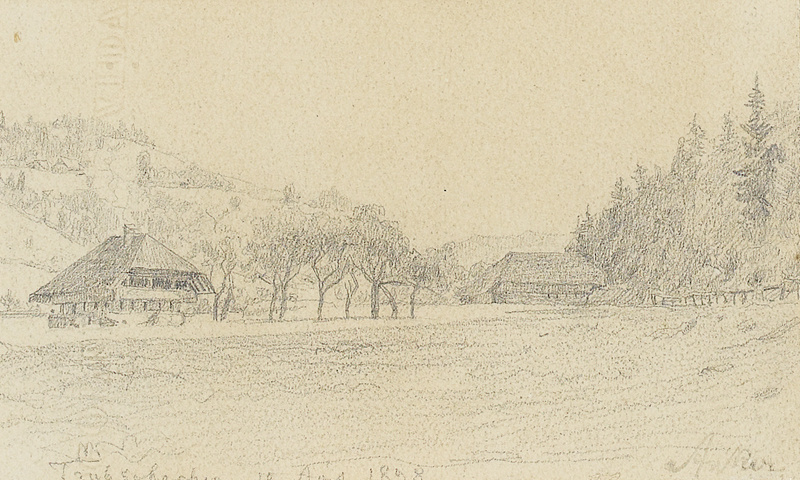
Sketch of Trubschachen in 1898

Aerial view (1950)

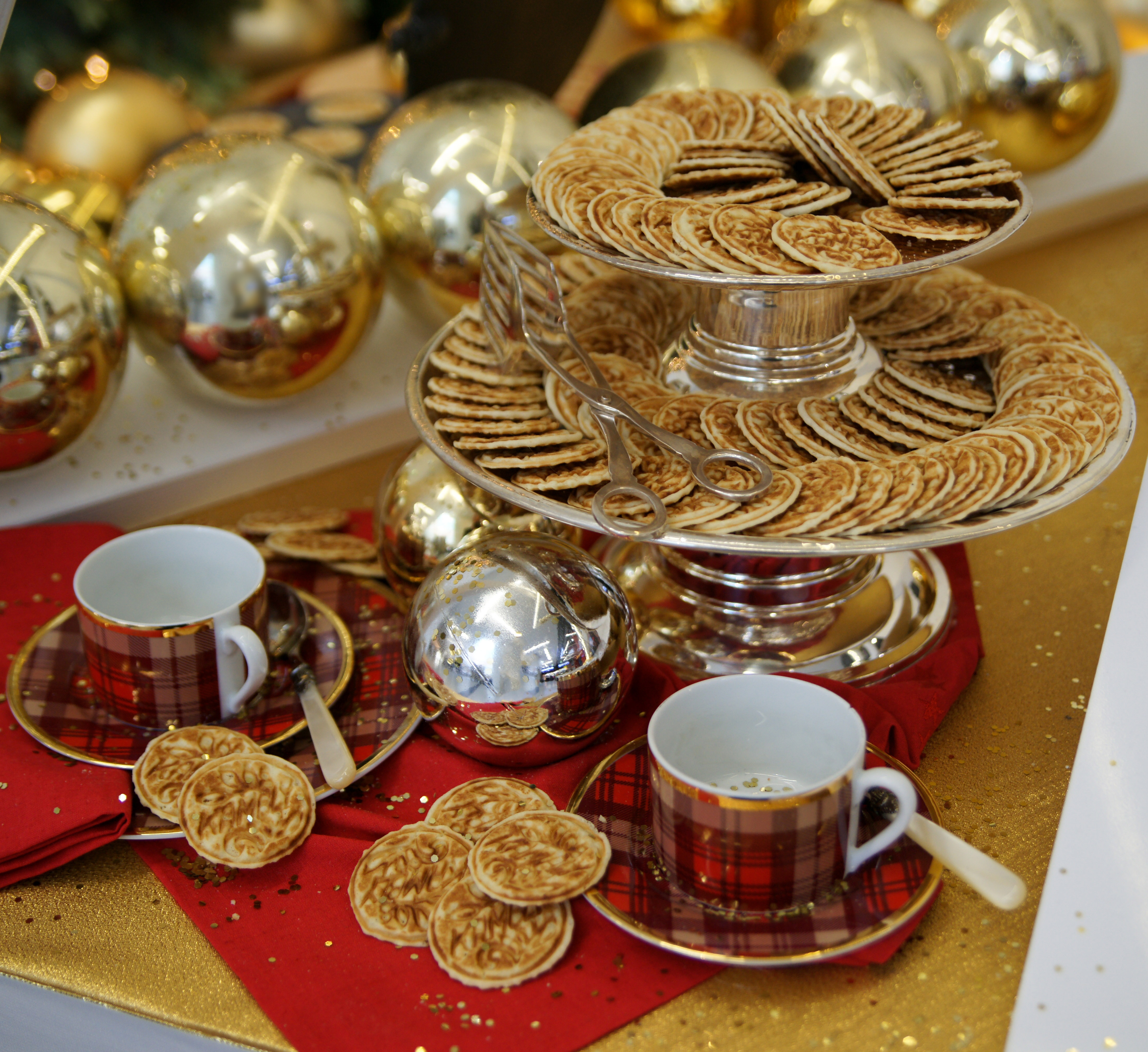
Biscuits (or cookies) from the Kambly factory in Trubschachen

Trubschachen is first mentioned in 1667 as Trueberschachen.

The municipality grew out of a cluster of six farms along the banks of the Ilfis river during the Middle Ages. The parishes of Langnau im Emmental and Trub both claimed the farm houses. In 1666 they were divided, with three going to each parish. As the settlement grew and the situation in surrounding municipalities changed, the farms were too far from either municipality. In 1727 the farms began to exercise limited self-government, passing laws regarding the poor and citizenship. In 1737 a school opened in the community, which was known as Schachen at the time. This was followed by establishing a village police force in 1773 and collecting taxes in 1775–77. An einwohnergemeinde or citizen's community was founded in 1852, though it was called Innerer Lauperswilviertel until 1867. It became an independent parish in 1874 and the parish church was built in 1890–92. The political municipality was created in 1923 from parts of Trub and Langnau.

Traditionally the residents of the area raised crops on the valley floor. In the 18th century they began weaving canvas and processing milk into cheese. The first cheese factory opened in 1827 and by 1900 there were five in the municipality. Today that number has shrunk to only two. In 1875, the Bern-Lucerne railroad connected Trubschachen to the growing Swiss rail network and brought industry into the municipality. In 1910 the Kambly Biscuit factory opened and became the largest employer. Other industries settled in the area as well. Today tourism is a small, but significant part of the local economy and since 1964 painting exhibitions draw many tourists to the municipality.

In addition to the Swiss Reformed parish, various Baptist congregations exist in Trubschachen as well as a New Apostolic congregation with a church from 1947.

== Geography ==
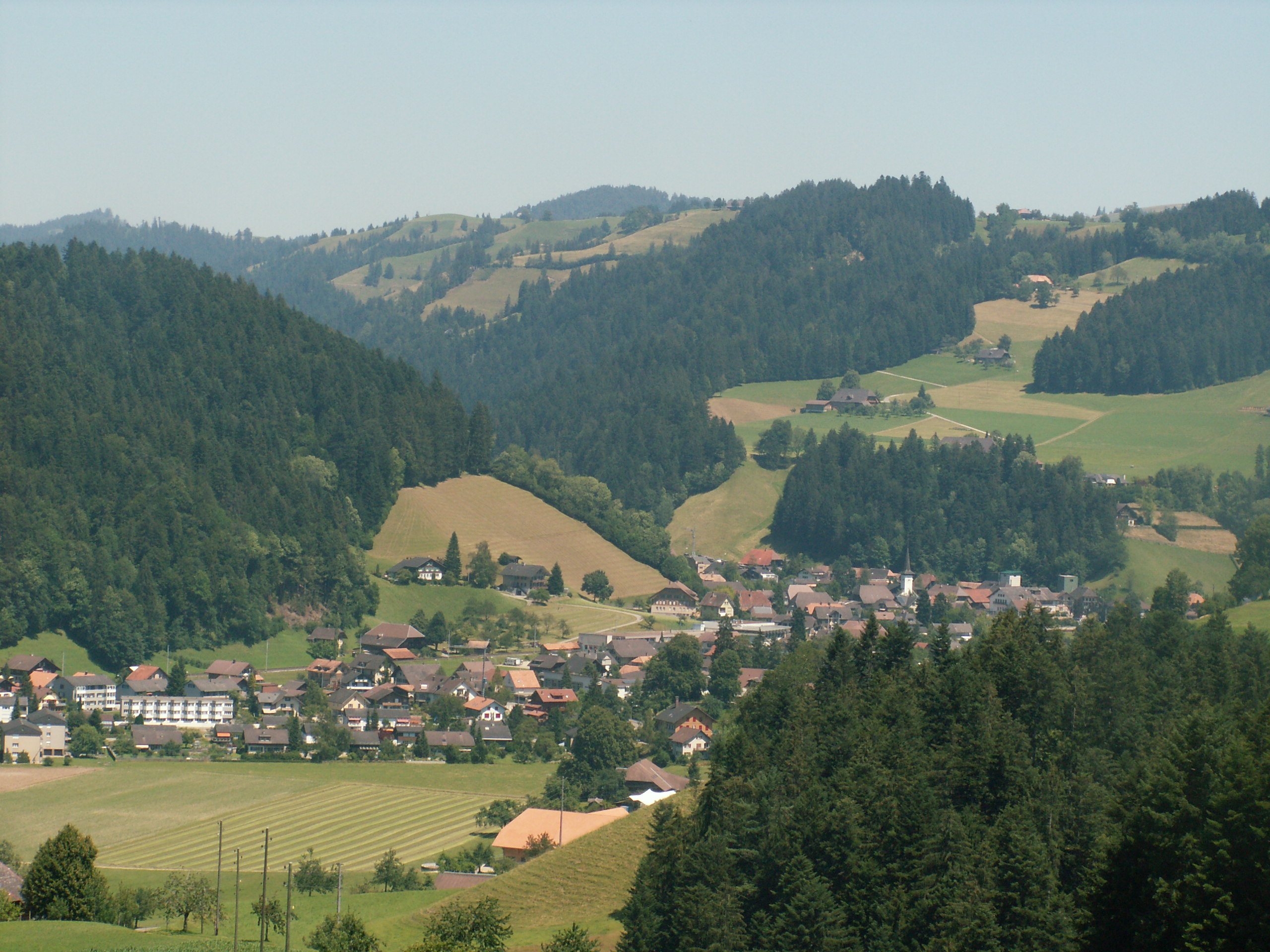
The village of Trubschachen

Trubschachen has an area of 15.65 km^{2} (6.04 sq mi). As of 2012, a total of 7.97 km^{2} (3.08 mi^{2}) or 51.0% is used for agricultural purposes, while 6.67 km^{2} (2.58 mi^{2}) or 42.7% is forested. The rest of the municipality is 0.77 km^{2} (0.30 mi^{2}) or 4.9% is settled (buildings or roads), 0.16 km^{2} (0.062 mi^{2}) or 1.0% is either rivers or lakes and 0.04 km^{2} (9.9 acres) or 0.3% is unproductive land.

During the same year, housing and buildings made up 2.6% and transportation infrastructure made up 1.8%. A total of 40.2% of the total land area is heavily forested and 2.5% is covered with orchards or small clusters of trees. Of the agricultural land, 5.6% is used for growing crops and 29.3% is pasturage and 15.4% is used for alpine pastures. All the water in the municipality is flowing water.

The municipality includes the confluence of the Trub into the Ilfis rivers, the land around the Ilfis and the peak of the Blapbach, at about 1,000 m (3,300 ft). It consists of the village of Trubschachen and scattered farm houses along the river and up the Blapbach.

On 31 December 2009 Amtsbezirk Signau, the municipality's former district, was dissolved. On the following day, 1 January 2010, it joined the newly created Verwaltungskreis Emmental.

== Coat of arms ==
The blazon of the municipal coat of arms is Per fess Or two Mullets Azure and of the last a Tau Cross couped of the first.

== Demographics ==
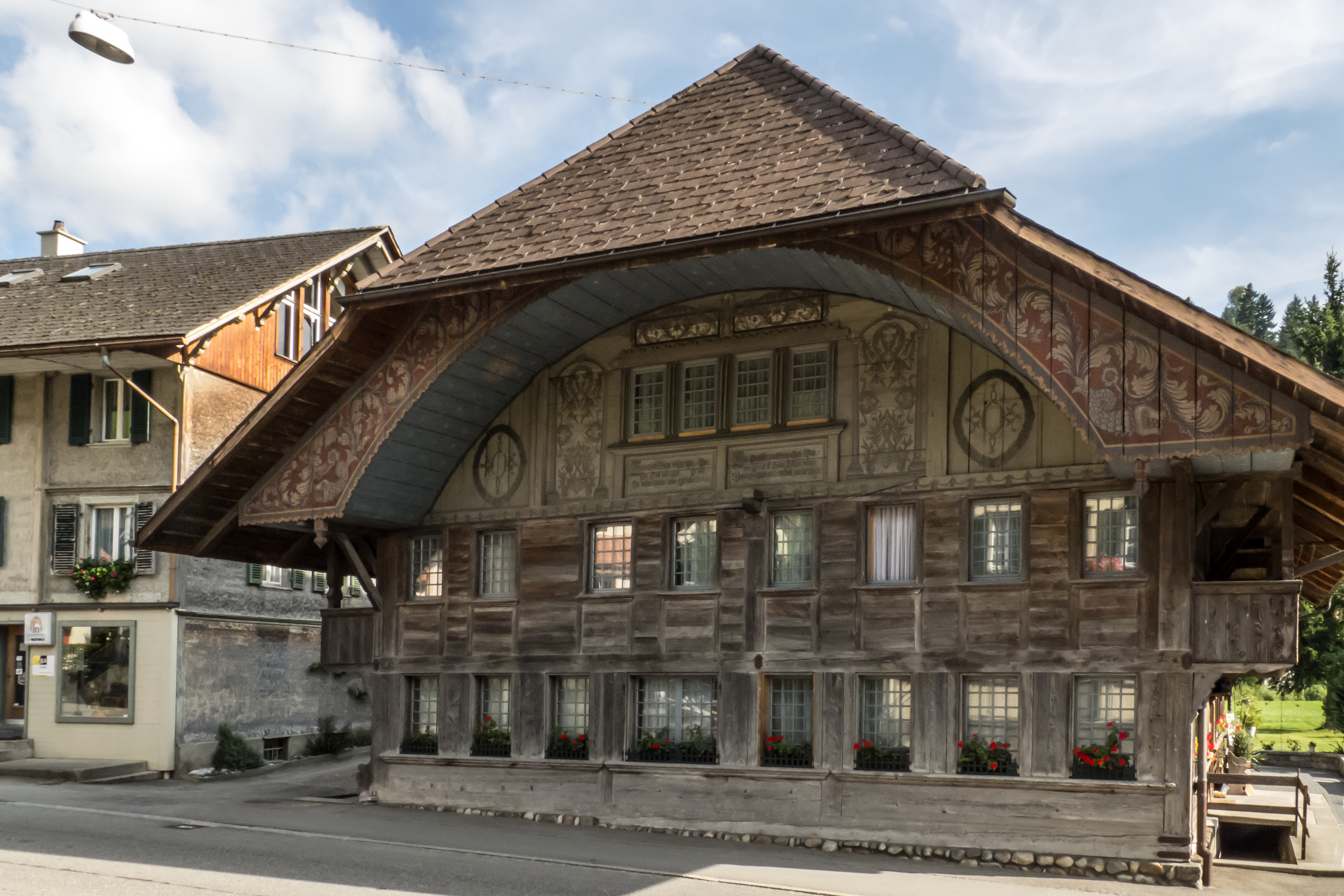
The farm house Himmelhaus in Trubschachen

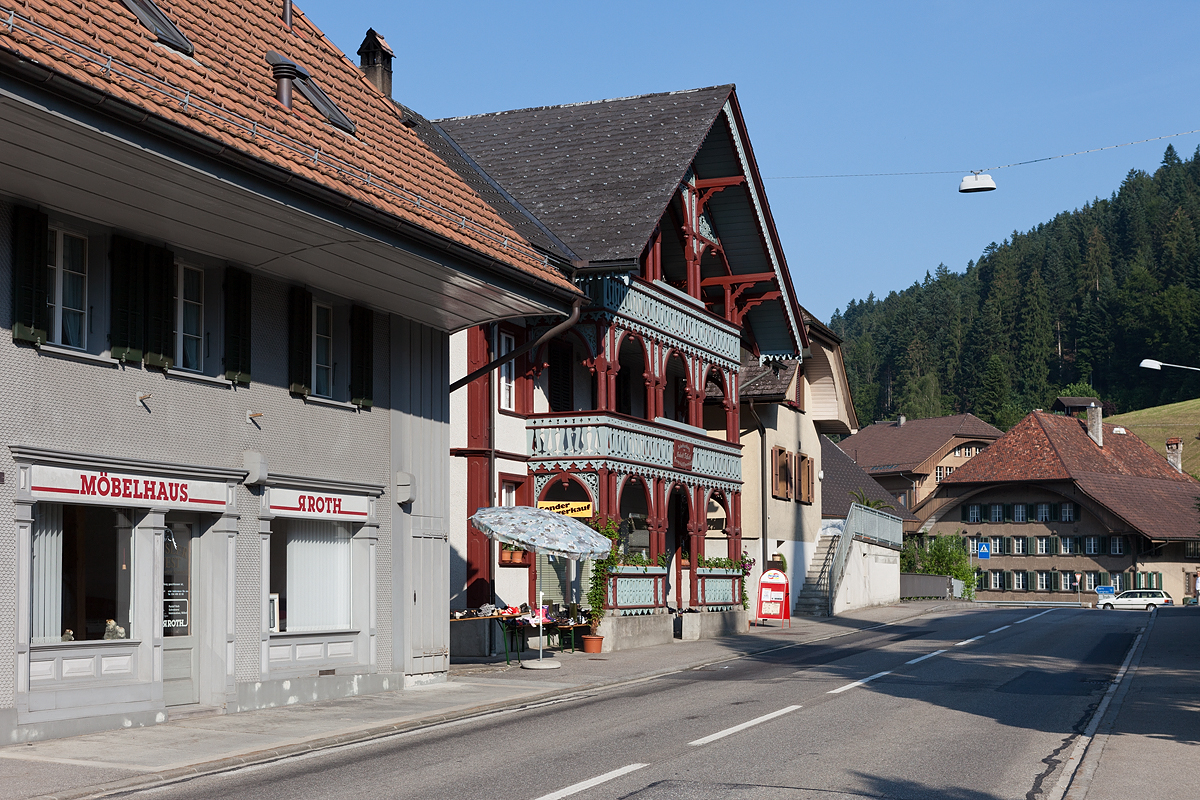
Main street in Trubschachen

Trubschachen has a population (as of December 2020) of 1,465. As of 2012, 9.5% of the population are resident foreign nationals. Between the last 2 years (2010-2012) the population changed at a rate of 1.1%. Migration accounted for 0.6%, while births and deaths accounted for -0.5%.

Most of the population (as of 2000) speaks German (1,437 or 92.0%) as their first language, Albanian is the second most common (28 or 1.8%) and Turkish is the third (8 or 0.5%). There are 3 people who speak French, 3 people who speak Italian.

As of 2008, the population was 49.4% male and 50.6% female. The population was made up of 636 Swiss men (45.3% of the population) and 58 (4.1%) non-Swiss men. There were 651 Swiss women (46.4%) and 59 (4.2%) non-Swiss women. Of the population in the municipality, 588 or about 37.6% were born in Trubschachen and lived there in 2000. There were 618 or 39.6% who were born in the same canton, while 161 or 10.3% were born somewhere else in Switzerland, and 144 or 9.2% were born outside of Switzerland.

As of 2012, children and teenagers (0–19 years old) make up 20.9% of the population, while adults (20–64 years old) make up 56.6% and seniors (over 64 years old) make up 22.6%.

As of 2000, there were 682 people who were single and never married in the municipality. There were 752 married individuals, 99 widows or widowers and 29 individuals who are divorced.

As of 2010, there were 184 households that consist of only one person and 49 households with five or more people. In 2000, a total of 580 apartments (89.4% of the total) were permanently occupied, while 37 apartments (5.7%) were seasonally occupied and 32 apartments (4.9%) were empty. As of 2012, the construction rate of new housing units was 9.2 new units per 1000 residents. The vacancy rate for the municipality, in 2013, was 1.3%. In 2012, single family homes made up 29.9% of the total housing in the municipality.

The historical population is given in the following chart:

== Economy ==
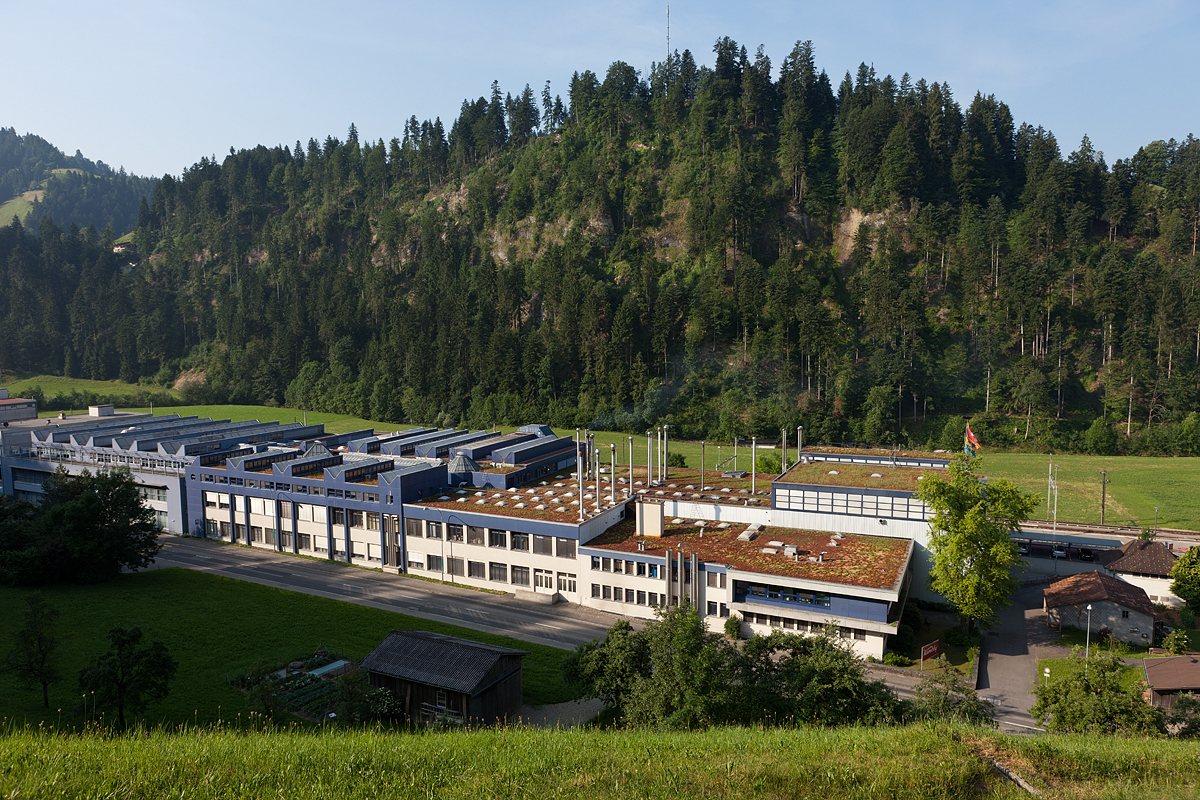
The Kambly Biscuit Factory in Trubschachen

As of 2011, Trubschachen had an unemployment rate of 1.29%. As of 2011, there were a total of 987 people employed in the municipality. Of these, there were 170 people employed in the primary economic sector and about 55 businesses involved in this sector. 540 people were employed in the secondary sector and there were 20 businesses in this sector. 277 people were employed in the tertiary sector, with 48 businesses in this sector. There were 821 residents of the municipality who were employed in some capacity, of which females made up 41.8% of the workforce.

In 2008 there were a total of 778 full-time equivalent jobs. The number of jobs in the primary sector was 104, all of which were in agriculture. The number of jobs in the secondary sector was 469 of which 407 or (86.8%) were in manufacturing and 62 (13.2%) were in construction. The number of jobs in the tertiary sector was 205. In the tertiary sector; 32 or 15.6% were in wholesale or retail sales or the repair of motor vehicles, 10 or 4.9% were in the movement and storage of goods, 38 or 18.5% were in a hotel or restaurant, 14 or 6.8% were technical professionals or scientists, 10 or 4.9% were in education and 75 or 36.6% were in health care.

In 2000, there were 527 workers who commuted into the municipality and 387 workers who commuted away. The municipality is a net importer of workers, with about 1.4 workers entering the municipality for every one leaving. A total of 434 workers (45.2% of the 961 total workers in the municipality) both lived and worked in Trubschachen. Of the working population, 11.4% used public transportation to get to work, and 40.2% used a private car.

The local and cantonal tax rate in Trubschachen is one of the lowest in the canton. In 2012 the average local and cantonal tax rate on a married resident, with two children, of Trubschachen making 150,000 CHF was 12.5%, while an unmarried resident's rate was 18.7%. For comparison, the average rate for the entire canton in 2011, was 14.2% and 22.0%, while the nationwide average was 12.3% and 21.1% respectively.

In 2010 there were a total of 577 tax payers in the municipality. Of that total, 124 made over 75,000 CHF per year. There were 6 people who made between 15,000 and 20,000 per year. The greatest number of workers, 177, made between 50,000 and 75,000 CHF per year. The average income of the over 75,000 CHF group in Trubschachen was 108,265 CHF, while the average across all of Switzerland was 131,244 CHF.

In 2011 a total of 2.0% of the population received direct financial assistance from the government.

== Politics ==
In the 2011 federal election the most popular party was the Swiss People's Party (SVP) which received 35.5% of the vote. The next three most popular parties were the Conservative Democratic Party (BDP) (30.8%), the Social Democratic Party (SP) (10.2%) and the Green Party (8.6%). In the federal election, a total of 559 votes were cast, and the voter turnout was 52.0%.

== Religion ==
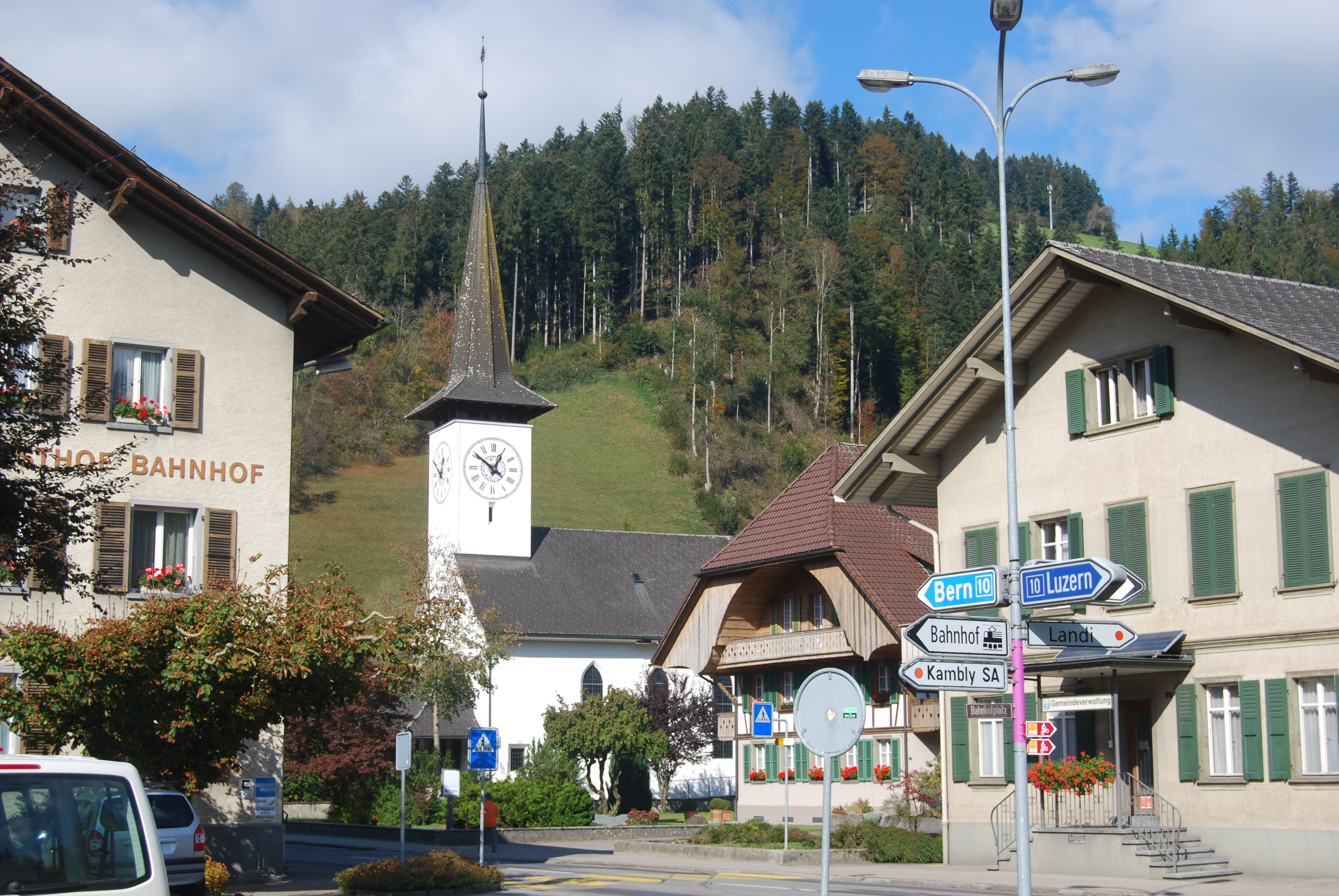
Swiss Reformed church in Trubschachen village

From the 2000 census, 1,163 or 74.5% belonged to the Swiss Reformed Church, while 80 or 5.1% were Roman Catholic. Of the rest of the population, there were 7 members of an Orthodox church (or about 0.45% of the population), and there were 83 individuals (or about 5.31% of the population) who belonged to another Christian church. There were 47 (or about 3.01% of the population) who were Muslim. There were 3 individuals who were Buddhist, 63 individuals who were Hindu and 4 individuals who belonged to another church. 48 (or about 3.07% of the population) belonged to no church, are agnostic or atheist, and 64 individuals (or about 4.10% of the population) did not answer the question.

== Education ==
In Trubschachen about 48.6% of the population have completed non-mandatory upper secondary education, and 11.5% have completed additional higher education (either university or a Fachhochschule). Of the 104 who had completed some form of tertiary schooling listed in the census, 74.0% were Swiss men, 18.3% were Swiss women, 4.8% were non-Swiss men.

The Canton of Bern school system provides one year of non-obligatory Kindergarten, followed by six years of Primary school. This is followed by three years of obligatory lower Secondary school where the students are separated according to ability and aptitude. Following the lower Secondary students may attend additional schooling or they may enter an apprenticeship.

During the 2012–13 school year, there were a total of 156 students attending classes in Trubschachen. There were a total of 24 students in the German language kindergarten classes in the municipality. Of the kindergarten students, 12.5% were permanent or temporary residents of Switzerland (not citizens) and 20.8% have a different mother language than the classroom language. The municipality's primary school had 95 students in German language classes. Of the primary students, 22.1% were permanent or temporary residents of Switzerland (not citizens) and 34.7% have a different mother language than the classroom language. During the same year, the lower secondary school had a total of 37 students. There were 16.2% who were permanent or temporary residents of Switzerland (not citizens) and 21.6% have a different mother language than the classroom language.

As of 2000, there were a total of 95 students attending any school in the municipality. Of those, 71 both lived and attended school in the municipality, while 24 students came from another municipality. During the same year, 154 residents attended schools outside the municipality.

== Sister Cities ==
The municipality of Trubschachen is a sister city with Midway, in the State of Utah, of the United States.

== Notable people ==
- Georges Huber (1910 in Trubschachen – 2003) a Swiss journalist who wrote many publications relating to the Catholic Church
