= Zell LU railway station =

Railway station in Zell, Switzerland

Zell LU
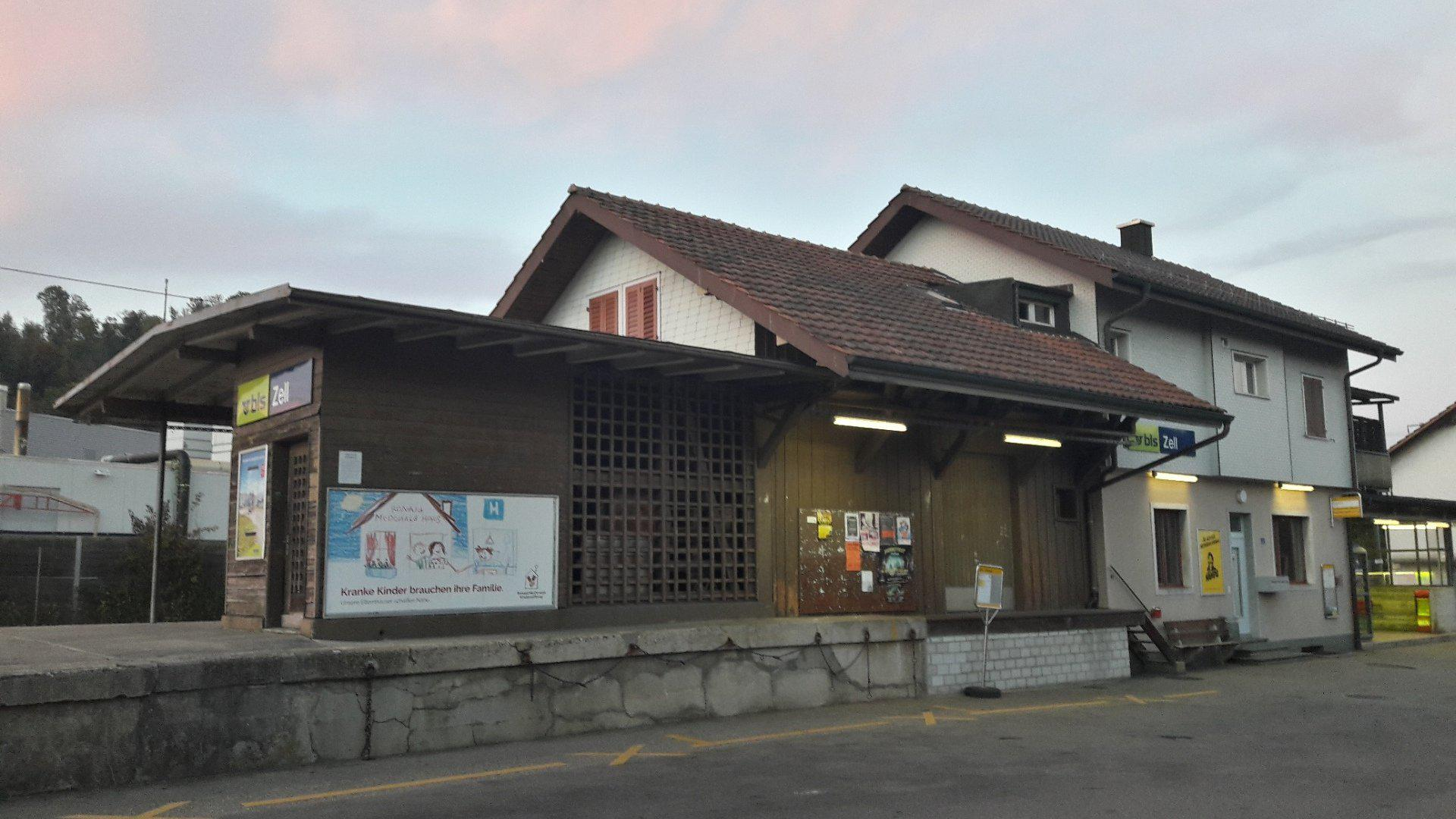
- The station building in 2018

General information
- Location: Zell; Switzerland
- Coordinates: 47°08′13″N 7°55′37″E
- Elevation: 588 m (1,929 ft)
- Owner: BLS AG
- Line: Huttwil–Wolhusen line
- Distance: 7.6 km (4.7 mi) from Huttwil
- Platforms: 2
- Tracks: 2
- Train operators: BLS AG
- Connections: PostAuto AG buses

Construction
- Parking: Yes (13 spaces)
- Accessible: No

Other information
- Station code: 8508293 (ZELL)
- Fare zone: 55 (Passepartout)

Passengers
- 2023: 680 per weekday (BLS)

Services
Preceding station	Lucerne S-Bahn	Following station
Hüswil towards Langenthal	S6	Gettnau towards Lucerne
Hüswil towards Langenthal	S7	Gettnau towards Lucerne
Location

Zell LU railway station (German: Bahnhof Zell LU) is a railway station in the municipality of Zell, in the Swiss canton of Lucerne. It is an intermediate stop on the standard gauge Huttwil–Wolhusen line of BLS AG.

== Services ==
As of the December 2024 timetable change, the following services stop at Zell LU:

- Lucerne S-Bahn S6/S7: half-hourly service (hourly on Sundays) between Langenthal and Lucerne. S7 trains operate combined with a RegioExpress between Wolhusen and Lucerne.

== Gallery ==
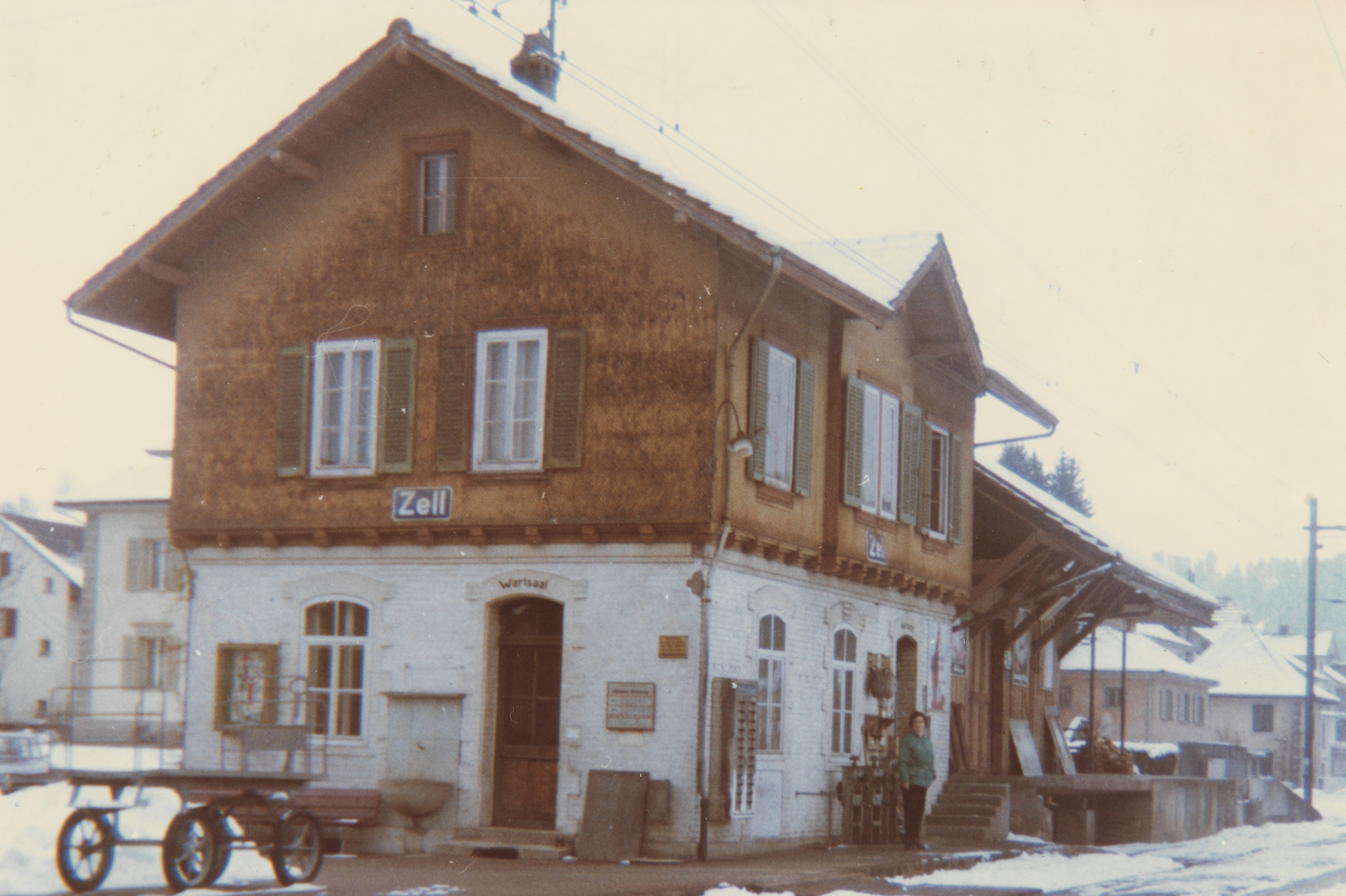
station building, 1973

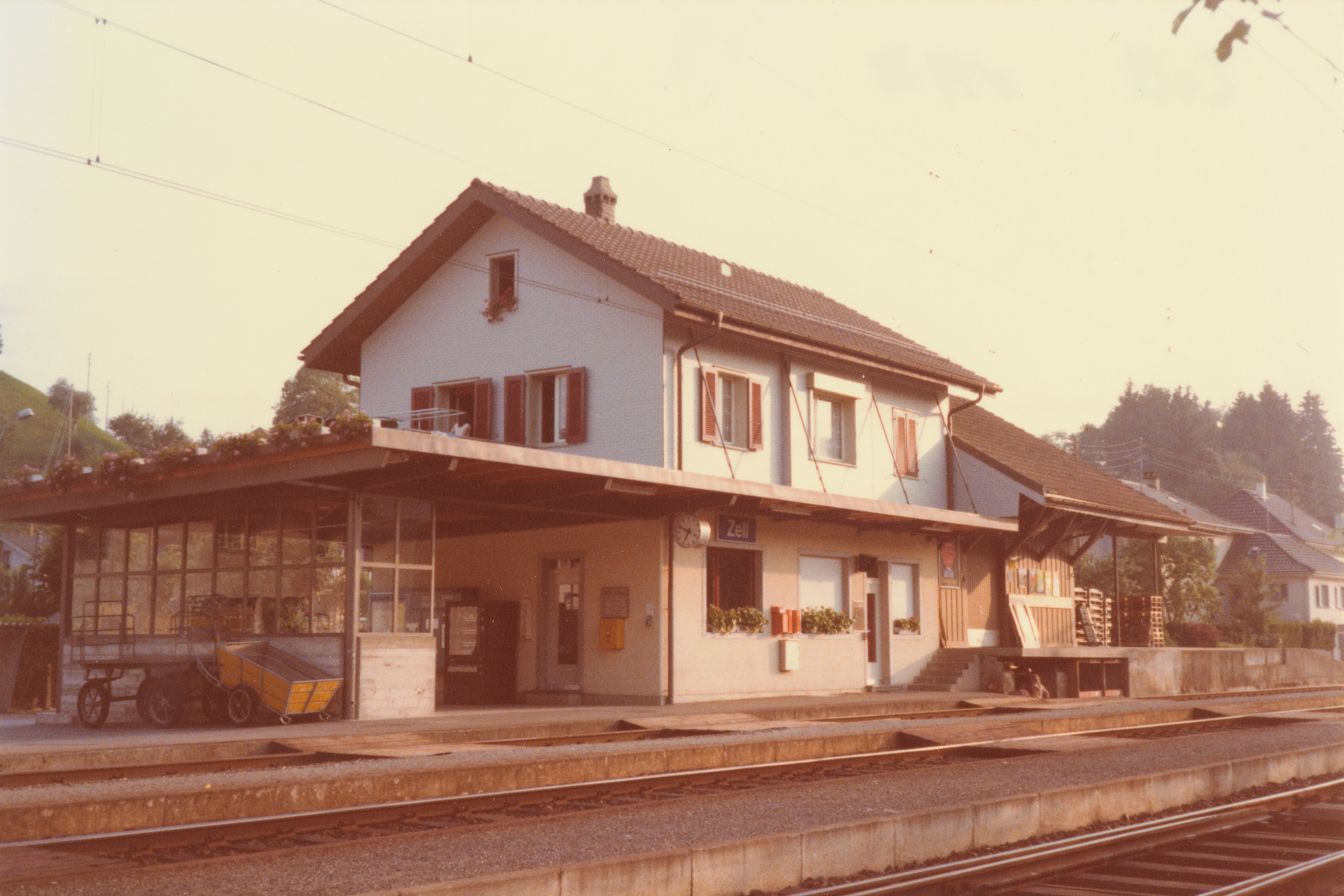
station building, 1979

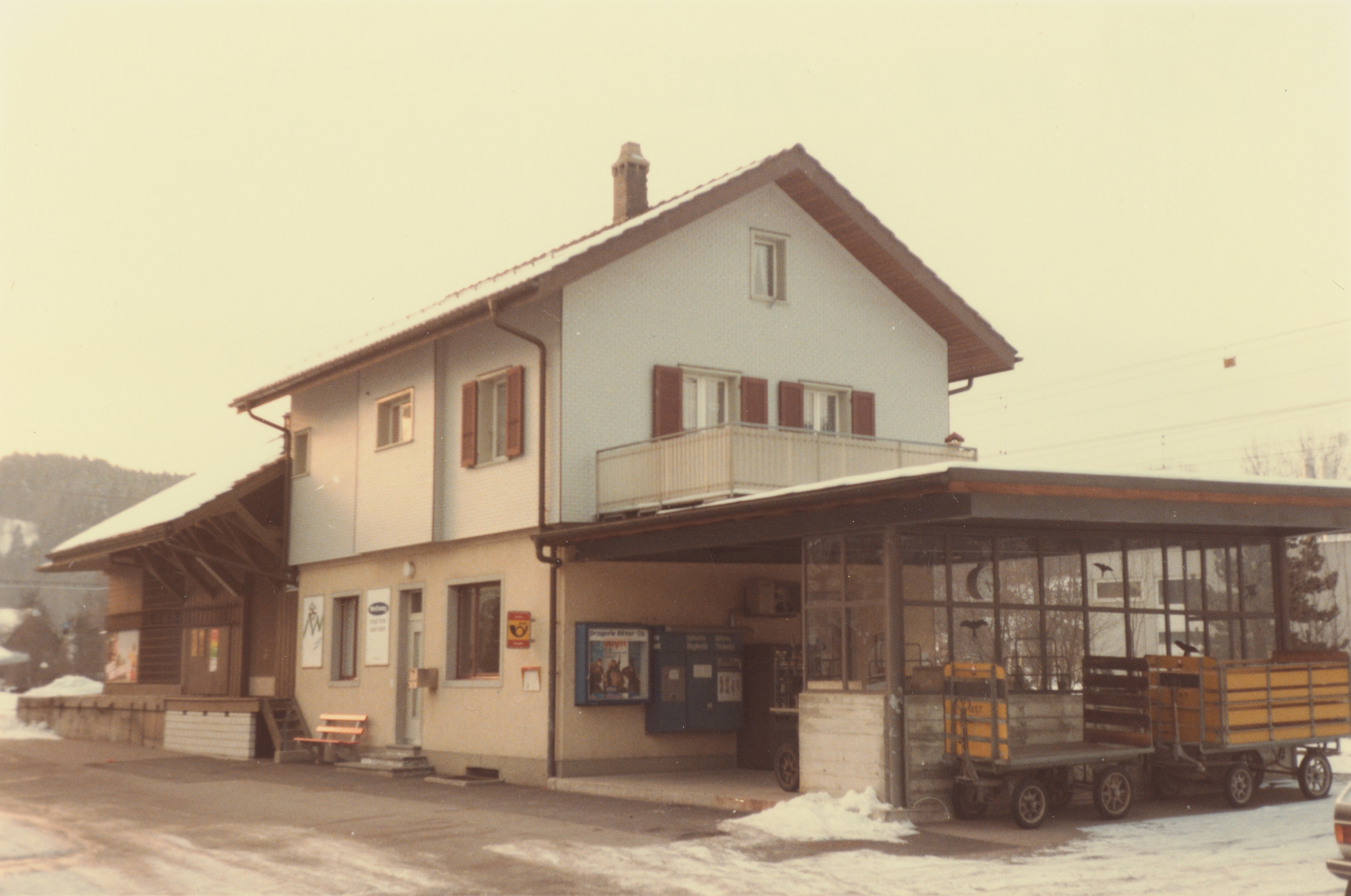
station building, 1986

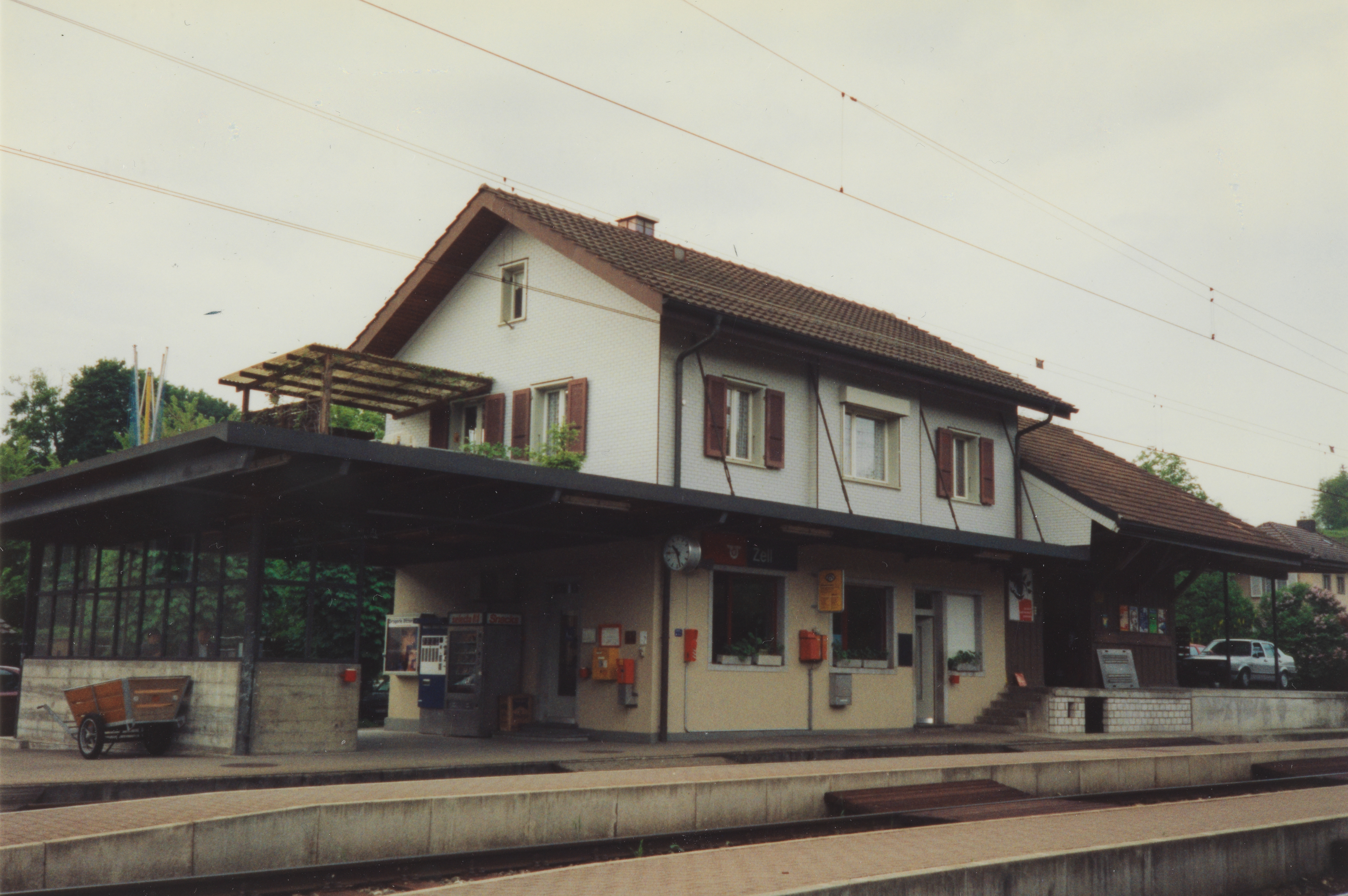
station building, 1996

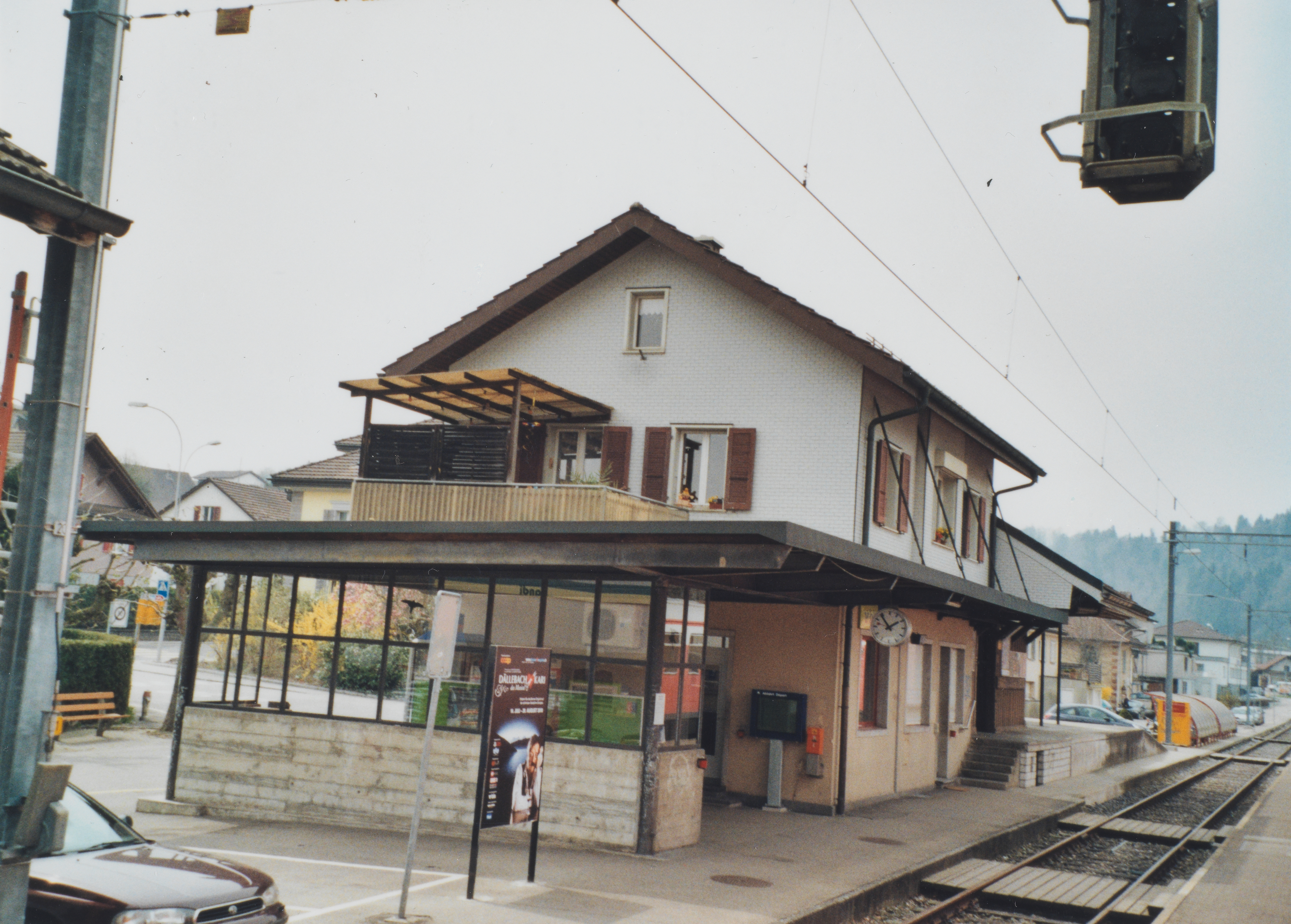
station building, 2010
