= Gettnau railway station =

Railway station in Gettnau, Switzerland

Gettnau
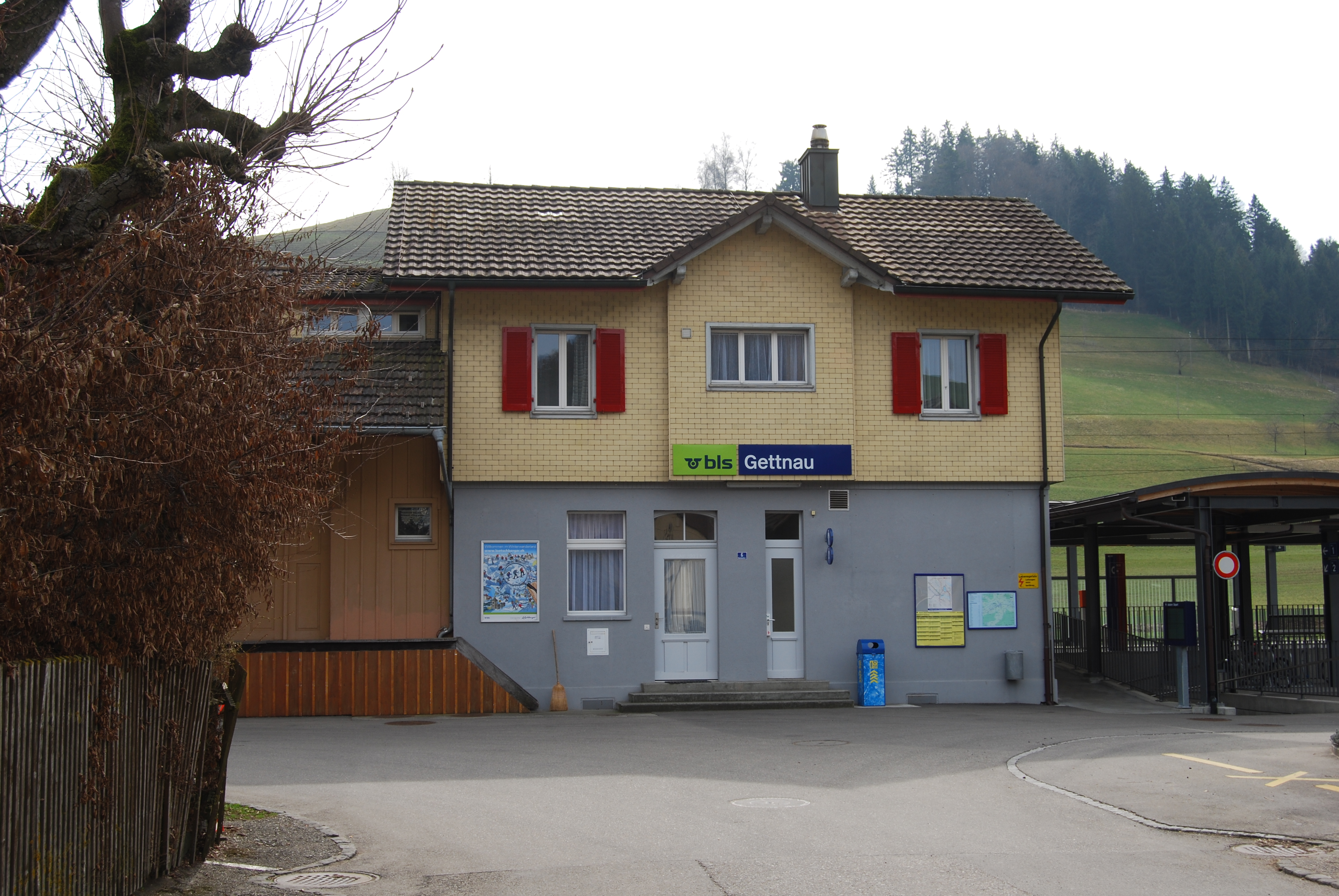
- The station building in 2012

General information
- Location: Gettnau; Switzerland
- Coordinates: 47°08′24″N 7°58′16″E
- Elevation: 545 m (1,788 ft)
- Owner: BLS AG
- Line: Huttwil–Wolhusen line
- Distance: 11.1 km (6.9 mi) from Huttwil
- Platforms: 2 side platforms
- Tracks: 2
- Train operators: BLS AG

Construction
- Parking: Yes (10 spaces)
- Accessible: Yes

Other information
- Station code: 8508294 (GET)
- Fare zone: 45 (Passepartout)

Passengers
- 2023: 250 per weekday (BLS)

Services
Preceding station	Lucerne S-Bahn	Following station
Zell LU towards Langenthal	S6	Willisau towards Lucerne
Zell LU towards Langenthal	S7	Willisau towards Lucerne
Location

Gettnau railway station (German: Bahnhof Gettnau) is a railway station in the municipality of Gettnau, in the Swiss canton of Lucerne. It is an intermediate stop on the standard gauge Huttwil–Wolhusen line of BLS AG.

== Services ==
As of the December 2024 timetable change, the following services stop at Gettnau:

- Lucerne S-Bahn S6/S7: half-hourly service (hourly on Sundays) between Langenthal and Lucerne. S7 trains operate combined with a RegioExpress between Wolhusen and Lucerne.

== Gallery ==
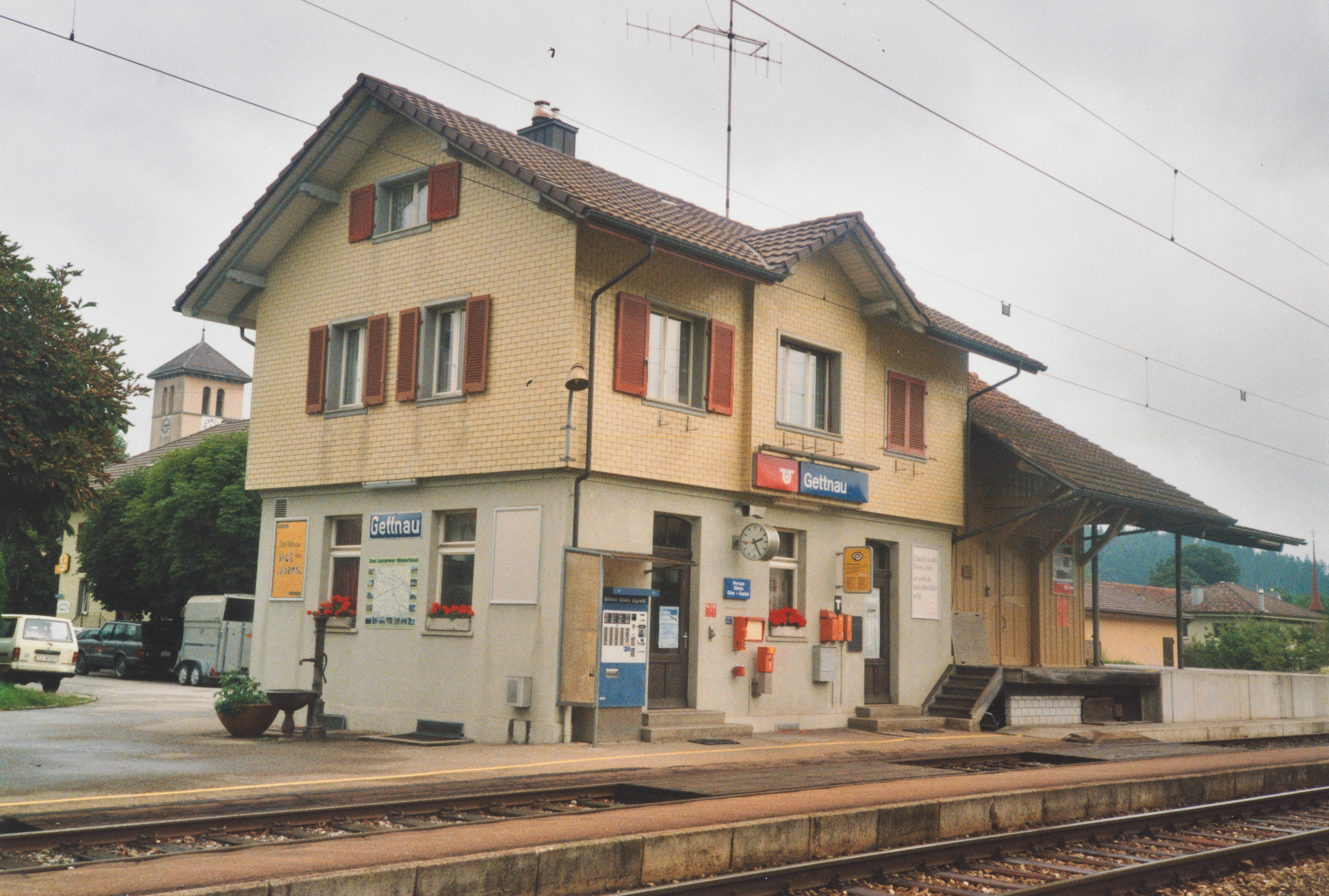
Station in 2000

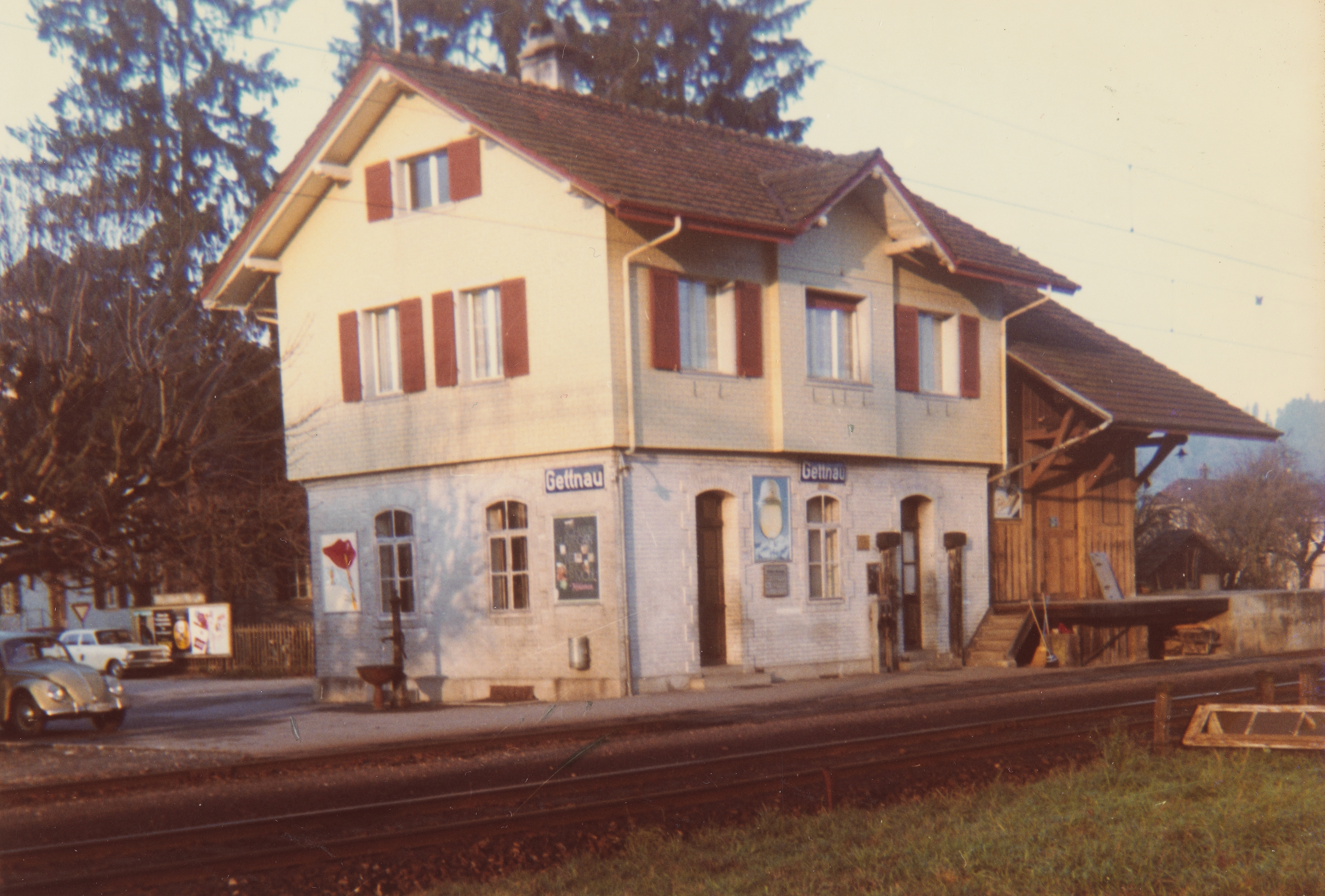
Station in c. 1970

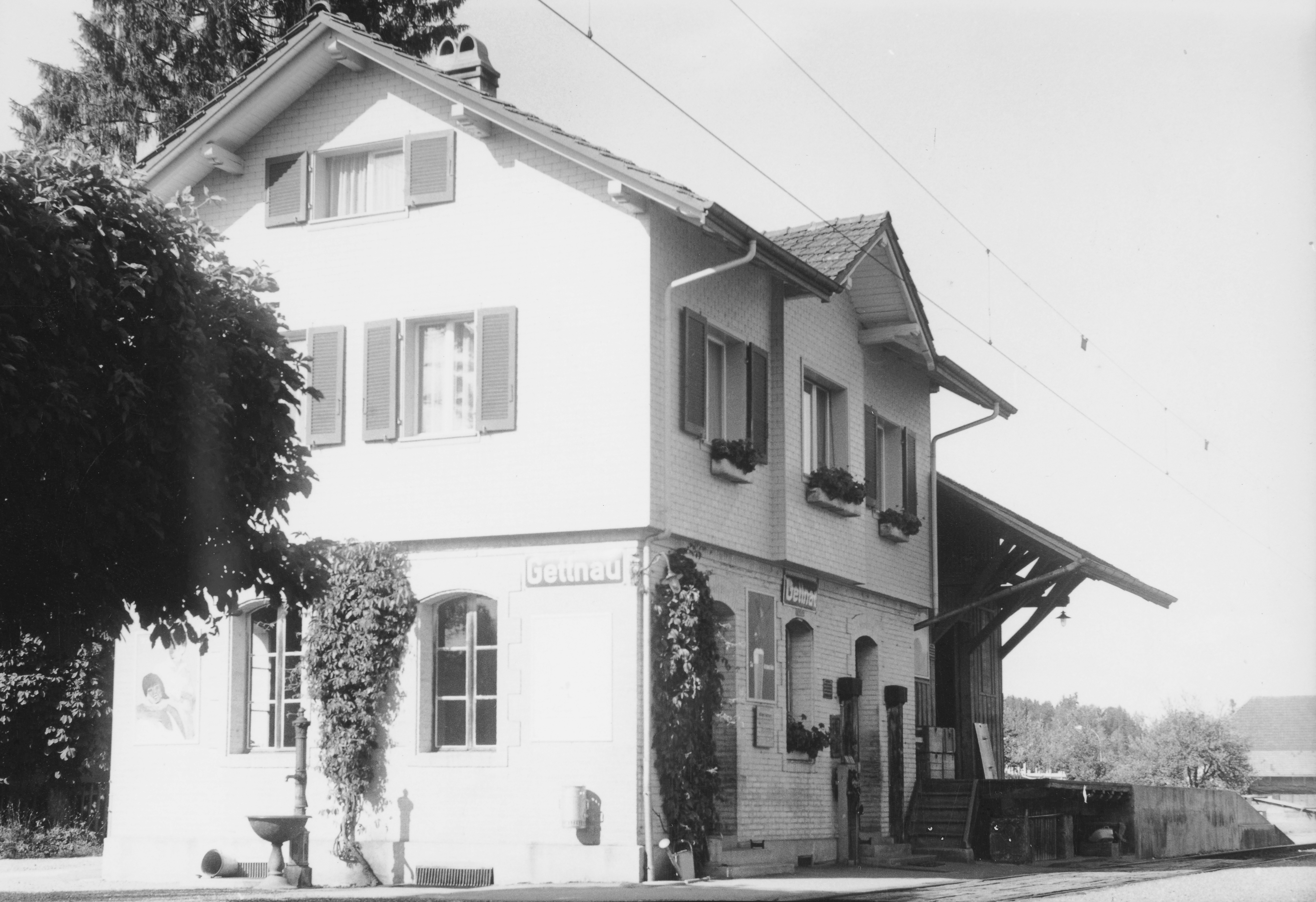
Station in 1965
