= Madiswil railway station =

Railway station in Madiswil, Switzerland

Madiswil
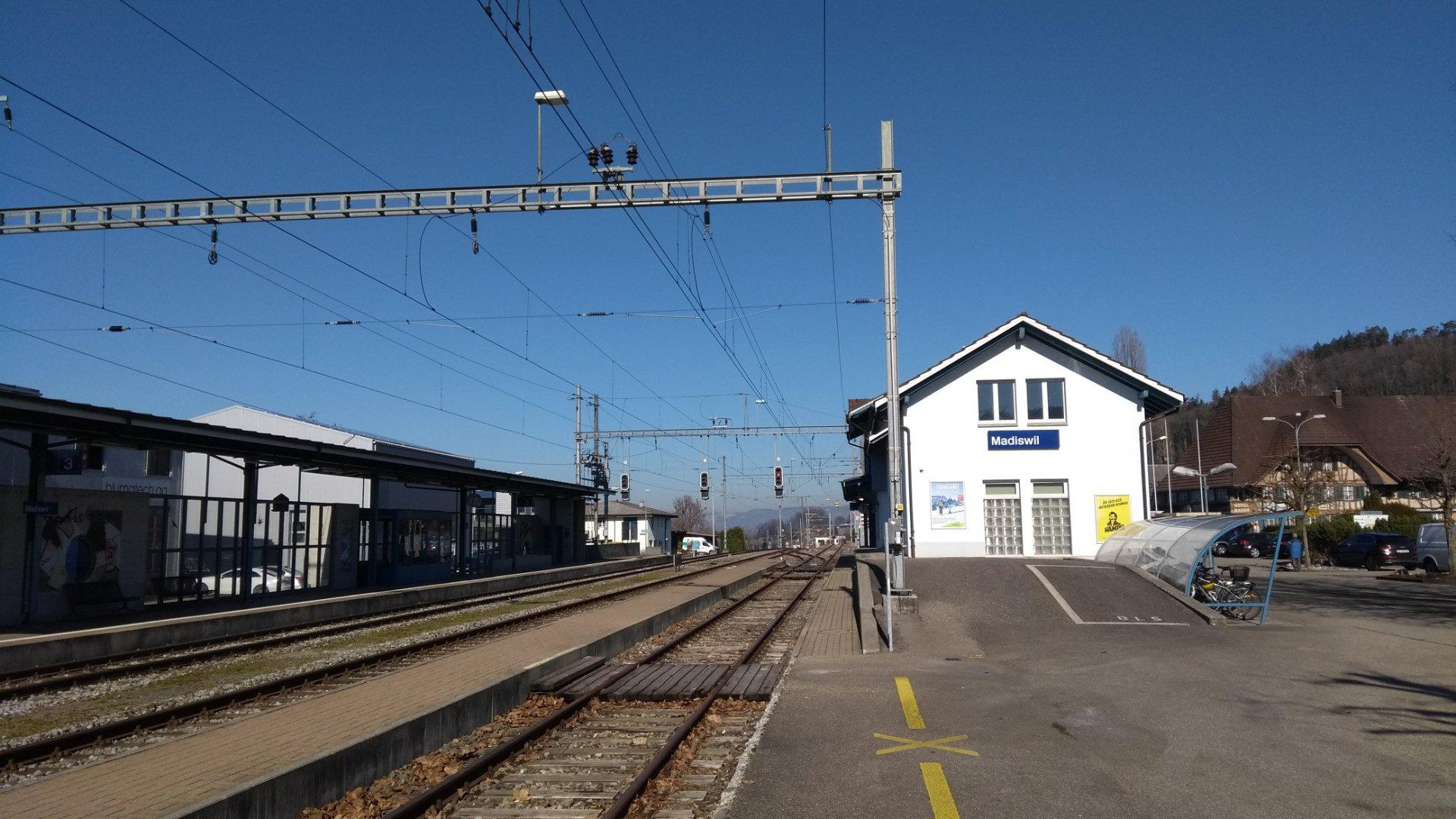
- The station building in 2018

General information
- Location: Madiswil; Switzerland
- Coordinates: 47°10′01″N 7°47′46″E
- Elevation: 534 m (1,752 ft)
- Owner: BLS AG
- Line: Langenthal–Huttwil line
- Distance: 6.0 km (3.7 mi) from Langenthal
- Platforms: 2 side platforms
- Tracks: 2
- Train operators: BLS AG

Construction
- Parking: Yes (13 spaces)
- Accessible: Yes

Other information
- Station code: 8508183 (MADI)
- Fare zone: 192 (Libero)

Passengers
- 2023: 540 per weekday (BLS)

Services
Preceding station	Lucerne S-Bahn	Following station
Gutenburg towards Langenthal	S6	Lindenholz towards Lucerne
Gutenburg towards Langenthal	S7	Lindenholz towards Lucerne
Location

Madiswil railway station (German: Bahnhof Madiswil) is a railway station in the municipality of Madiswil, in the Swiss canton of Bern. It is an intermediate stop on the standard gauge Langenthal–Huttwil line of BLS AG.

== Services ==
As of the December 2024 timetable change, the following services stop at Madiswil:

- Lucerne S-Bahn S6/S7: half-hourly service (hourly on Sundays) between Langenthal and Lucerne. S7 trains operate combined with a RegioExpress between Wolhusen and Lucerne.
