= Lindenholz railway station =

Railway station in Madiswil, Switzerland

Lindenholz
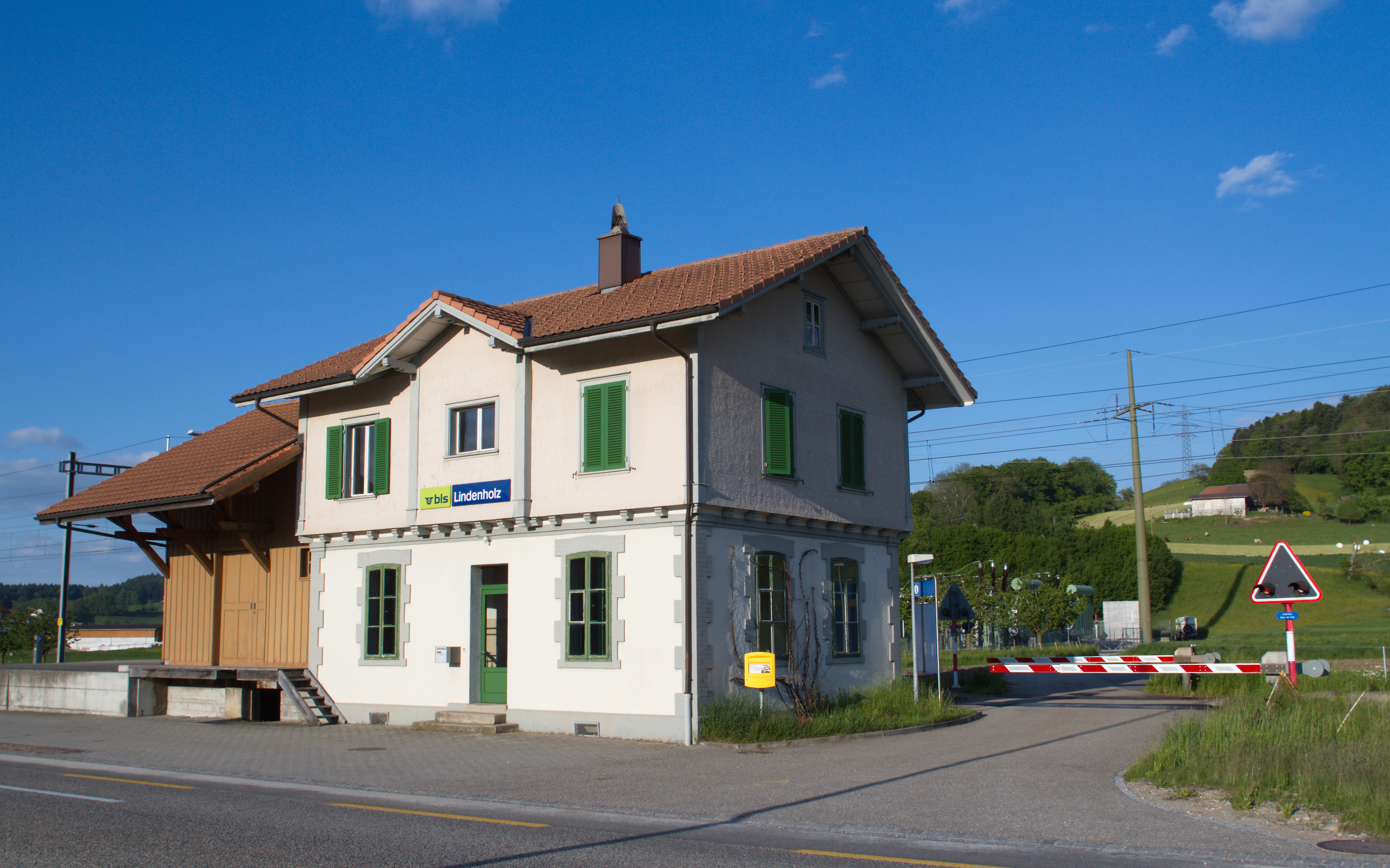
- The station building in 2012

General information
- Location: Madiswil; Switzerland
- Coordinates: 47°09′18″N 7°47′28″E
- Elevation: 545 m (1,788 ft)
- Owner: BLS AG
- Line: Langenthal–Huttwil line
- Distance: 7.5 km (4.7 mi) from Langenthal
- Platforms: 1 island platform
- Tracks: 2
- Train operators: BLS AG

Construction
- Parking: Yes (12 spaces)
- Accessible: No

Other information
- Station code: 8508184 (LHO)
- Fare zone: 194 (Libero)

Passengers
- 2023: Fewer than 50 persons per day (BLS)

Services
Preceding station	Lucerne S-Bahn	Following station
Madiswil towards Langenthal	S6	Kleindietwil towards Lucerne
Madiswil towards Langenthal	S7	Kleindietwil towards Lucerne
Location

Lindenholz railway station (German: Bahnhof Lindenholz) is a railway station in the municipality of Madiswil, in the Swiss canton of Bern. It is an intermediate stop and a request stop on the standard gauge Langenthal–Huttwil line of BLS AG.

== Services ==
As of the December 2024 timetable change, the following services stop at Lindenholz:

- Lucerne S-Bahn S6/S7: half-hourly service (hourly on Sundays) between Langenthal and Lucerne. S7 trains operate combined with a RegioExpress between Wolhusen and Lucerne.
