= Rohrbach railway station =

Railway station in Rohrbach, Switzerland

Rohrbach
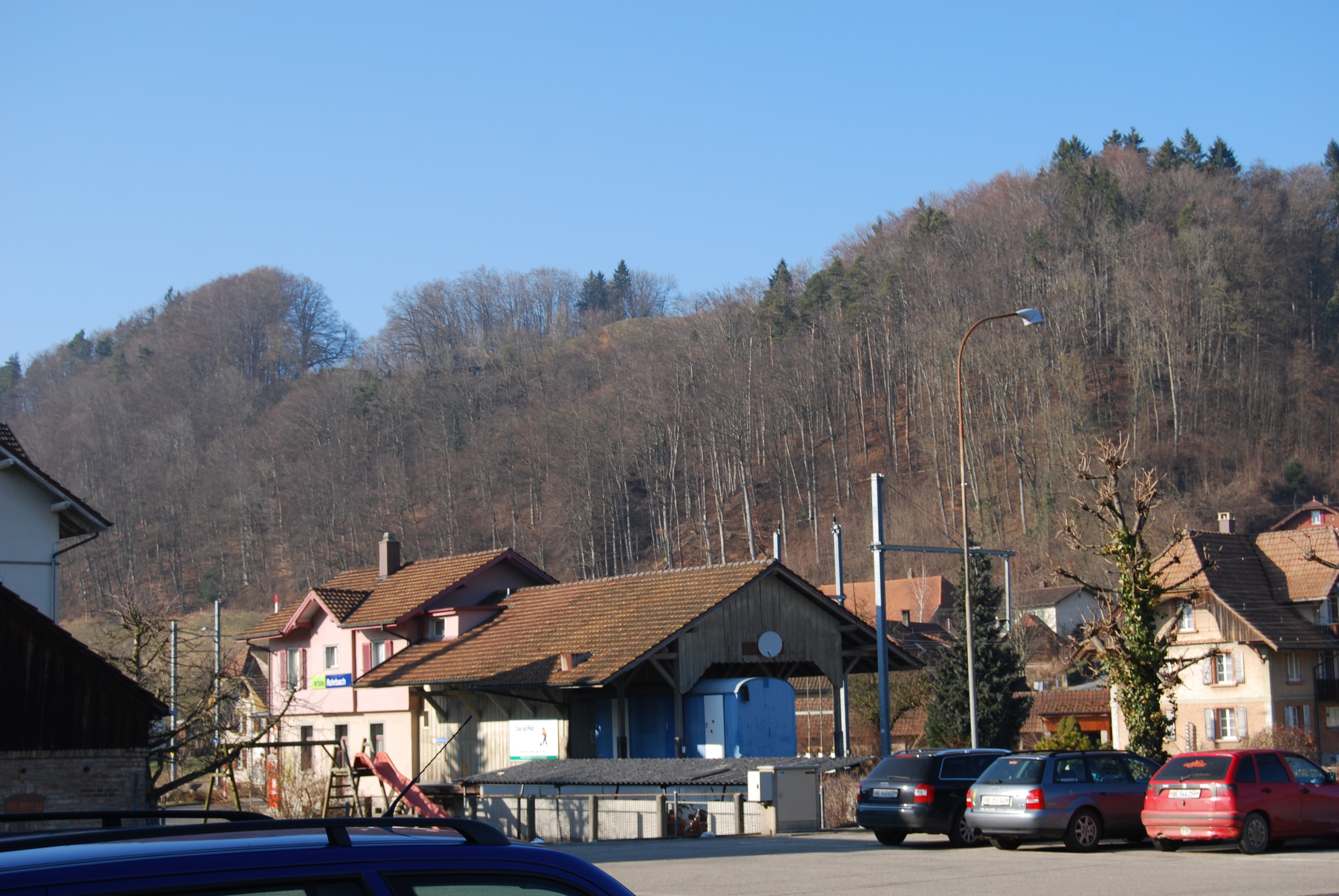
- The station building in 2012

General information
- Location: Rohrbach; Switzerland
- Coordinates: 47°08′13″N 7°48′50″E
- Elevation: 584 m (1,916 ft)
- Owner: BLS AG
- Line: Langenthal–Huttwil line
- Distance: 10.5 km (6.5 mi) from Langenthal
- Platforms: 1 side platform
- Tracks: 2
- Train operators: BLS AG

Construction
- Parking: Yes (16 spaces)
- Accessible: Yes

Other information
- Station code: 8508186 (RBA)
- Fare zone: 194 (Libero)

Passengers
- 2023: 480 per weekday (BLS)

Services
Preceding station	Lucerne S-Bahn	Following station
Kleindietwil towards Langenthal	S6	Huttwil towards Lucerne
Kleindietwil towards Langenthal	S7	Huttwil towards Lucerne
Location

Rohrbach railway station (German: Bahnhof Rohrbach) is a railway station in the municipality of Rohrbach, in the Swiss canton of Bern. It is an intermediate stop on the standard gauge Langenthal–Huttwil line of BLS AG.

== Services ==
As of the December 2024 timetable change, the following services stop at Rohrbach:

- Lucerne S-Bahn S6/S7: half-hourly service (hourly on Sundays) between Langenthal and Lucerne. S7 trains operate combined with a RegioExpress between Wolhusen and Lucerne.
