= Lotzwil railway station =

Railway station in Lotzwil, Switzerland

Lotzwil
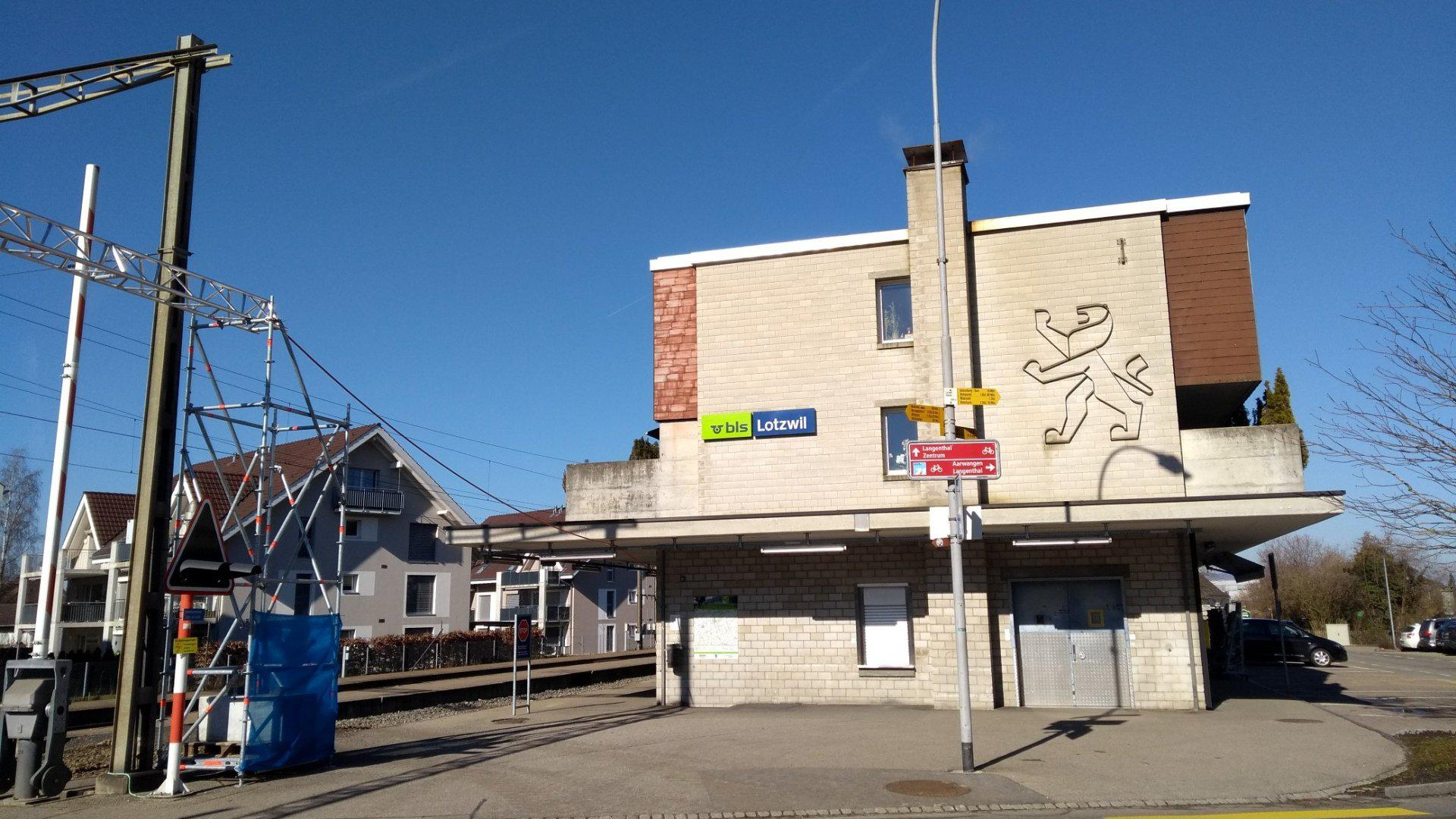
- The station building in 2018

General information
- Location: Lotzwil; Switzerland
- Coordinates: 47°11′20″N 7°47′17″E
- Elevation: 502 m (1,647 ft)
- Owner: BLS AG
- Line: Langenthal–Huttwil line
- Distance: 3.4 km (2.1 mi) from Langenthal
- Platforms: 2 side platforms
- Tracks: 2
- Train operators: BLS AG

Construction
- Parking: Yes (22 spaces)
- Accessible: Yes

Other information
- Station code: 8508182 (LOTZ)
- Fare zone: 190 (Libero)

Passengers
- 2023: 480 per weekday (BLS)

Services
| Preceding station | Lucerne S-Bahn | Following station |
|---|---|---|
| Langenthal Süd towards Langenthal | S6 | Gutenburg towards Lucerne |
| Langenthal Süd towards Langenthal | S7 | Gutenburg towards Lucerne |
Location

Lotzwil railway station (German: Bahnhof Lotzwil) is a railway station in the municipality of Lotzwil, in the Swiss canton of Bern. It is an intermediate stop on the standard gauge Langenthal–Huttwil line of BLS AG.

== Services ==
As of the December 2024 timetable change, the following services stop at Lotzwil:

- Lucerne S-Bahn S6/S7: half-hourly service (hourly on Sundays) between Langenthal and Lucerne. S7 trains operate combined with a RegioExpress between Wolhusen and Lucerne.
