= Kleindietwil railway station =

Railway station in Madiswil, Switzerland

Kleindietwil
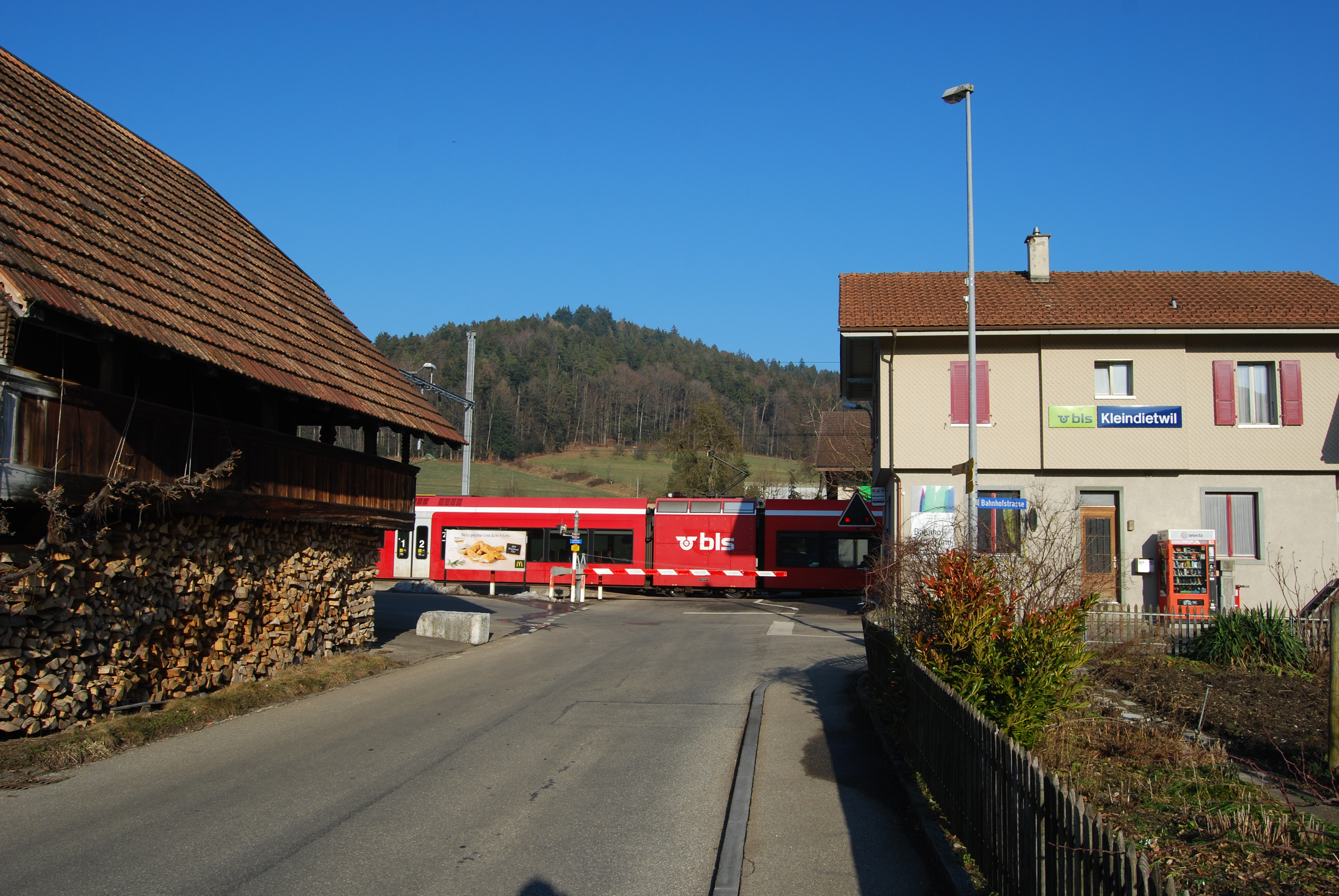
- The station building in 2012

General information
- Location: Madiswil; Switzerland
- Coordinates: 47°08′46″N 7°47′28″E
- Elevation: 558 m (1,831 ft)
- Owner: BLS AG
- Line: Langenthal–Huttwil line
- Distance: 8.4 km (5.2 mi) from Langenthal
- Platforms: 1 side platform
- Tracks: 1
- Train operators: BLS AG
- Connections: Bürgerbus Oeschebach - Ursenbach - Walterswil BE

Construction
- Parking: Yes (14 spaces)
- Accessible: Yes

Other information
- Station code: 8508185 (KDI)
- Fare zone: 194 (Libero)

Passengers
- 2023: 220 per weekday (BLS)

Services
Preceding station	Lucerne S-Bahn	Following station
Lindenholz towards Langenthal	S6	Rohrbach towards Lucerne
Lindenholz towards Langenthal	S7	Rohrbach towards Lucerne
Location

Kleindietwil railway station (German: Bahnhof Kleindietwil) is a railway station in the municipality of Madiswil, in the Swiss canton of Bern. It is an intermediate stop on the standard gauge Langenthal–Huttwil line of BLS AG.

== Services ==
As of the December 2024 timetable change, the following services stop at Kleindietwil:

- Lucerne S-Bahn S6/S7: half-hourly service (hourly on Sundays) between Langenthal and Lucerne. S7 trains operate combined with a RegioExpress between Wolhusen and Lucerne.
