= Gutenburg railway station =

Railway station in Lotzwil, Switzerland

Gutenburg
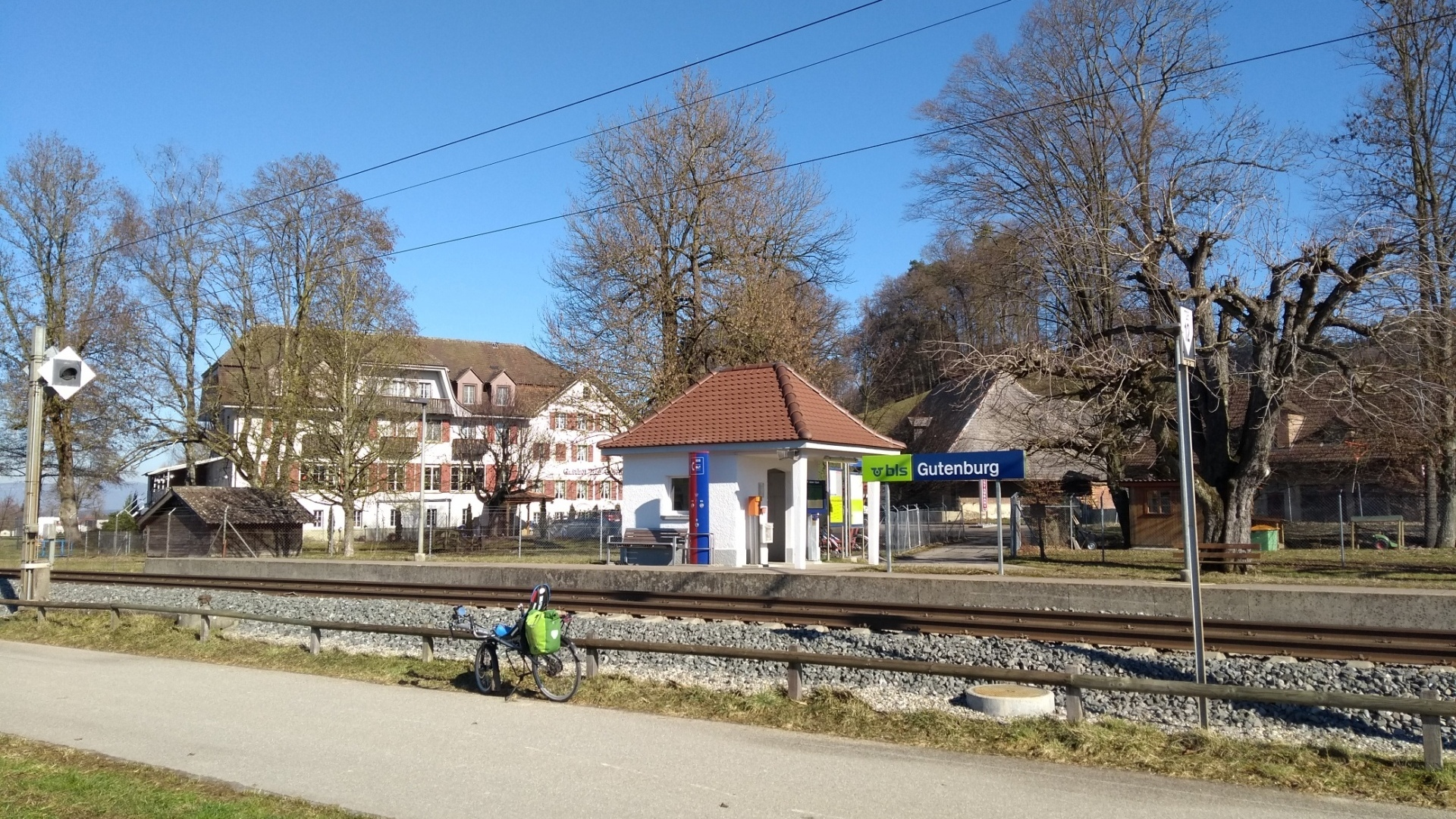
- The station in 2018

General information
- Location: Lotzwil; Switzerland
- Coordinates: 47°10′55″N 7°47′35″E
- Elevation: 512 m (1,680 ft)
- Owner: BLS AG
- Line: Langenthal–Huttwil line
- Distance: 4.4 km (2.7 mi) from Langenthal
- Platforms: 1 side platform
- Tracks: 1
- Train operators: BLS AG

Construction
- Accessible: Yes

Other information
- Station code: 8508174 (GUBU)
- Fare zone: 192 (Libero)

Passengers
- 2023: Fewer than 50 persons per day (BLS)

Services
Preceding station	Lucerne S-Bahn	Following station
Lotzwil towards Langenthal	S6	Madiswil towards Lucerne
Lotzwil towards Langenthal	S7	Madiswil towards Lucerne
Location

Gutenburg railway station (German: Bahnhof Gutenburg) is a railway station in the municipality of Lotzwil, in the Swiss canton of Bern. It is an intermediate stop and a request stop on the standard gauge Langenthal–Huttwil line of BLS AG.

== Services ==
As of the December 2024 timetable change, the following services stop at Gutenburg:

- Lucerne S-Bahn S6/S7: half-hourly service (hourly on Sundays) between Langenthal and Lucerne. S7 trains operate combined with a RegioExpress between Wolhusen and Lucerne.
