= Hüswil railway station =

Railway station in Zell, Switzerland

Hüswil
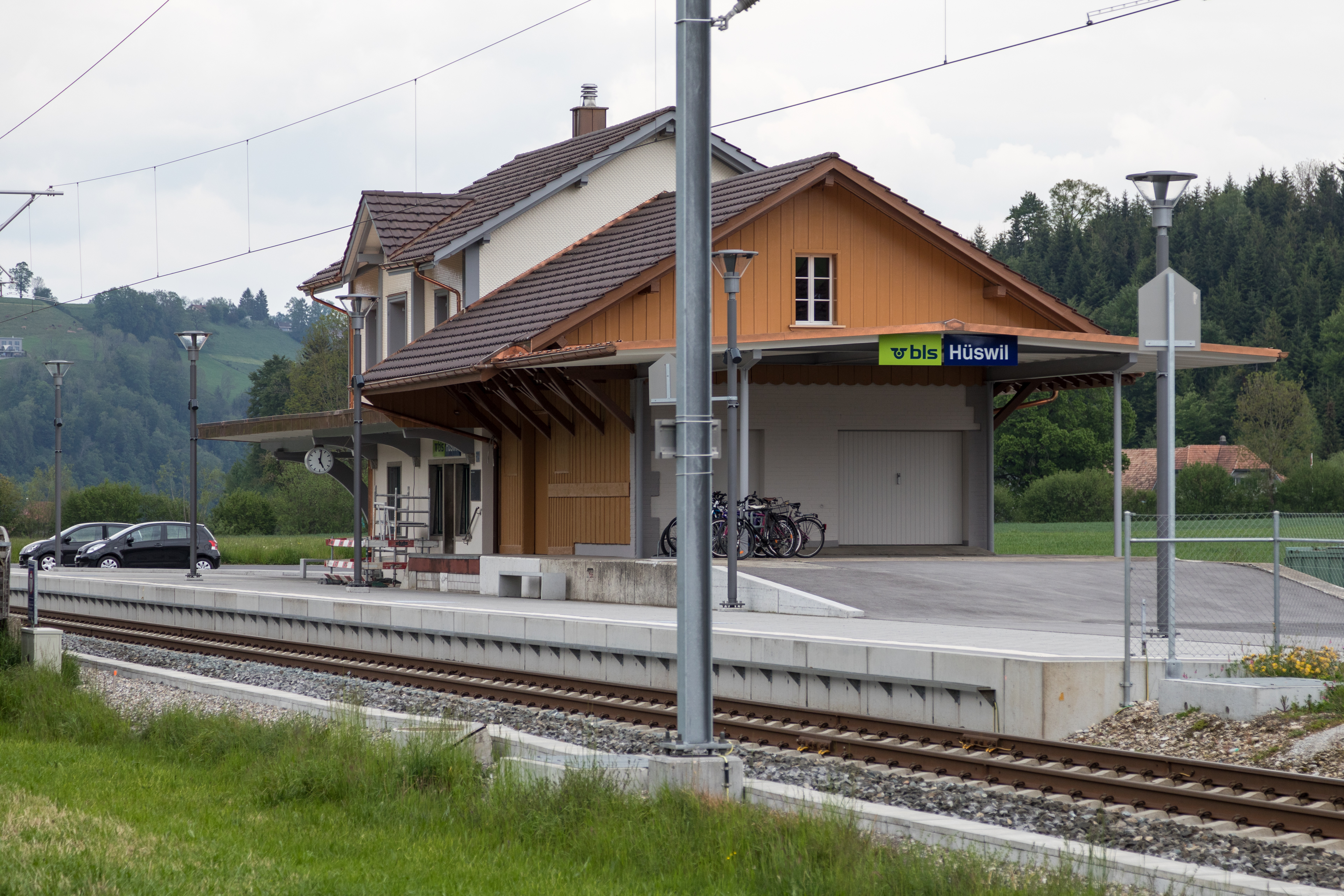
- The station building in 2019

General information
- Location: Zell; Switzerland
- Coordinates: 47°07′44″N 7°54′22″E
- Elevation: 613 m (2,011 ft)
- Owner: BLS AG
- Line: Huttwil–Wolhusen line
- Distance: 5.7 km (3.5 mi) from Huttwil
- Platforms: 1 side platform
- Tracks: 1
- Train operators: BLS AG
- Connections: PostAuto AG buses

Construction
- Parking: Yes (13 spaces)
- Accessible: Yes

Other information
- Station code: 8508292 (HUE)
- Fare zone: 55 (Passepartout); 180 (Libero)

Passengers
- 2023: 50 per weekday (BLS)

Services
Preceding station	Lucerne S-Bahn	Following station
Huttwil towards Langenthal	S6	Zell LU towards Lucerne
Huttwil towards Langenthal	S7	Zell LU towards Lucerne
Location

Hüswil railway station (German: Bahnhof Hüswil) is a railway station in the municipality of Zell, in the Swiss canton of Lucerne. It is an intermediate stop and a request stop on the standard gauge Huttwil–Wolhusen line of BLS AG.

== Services ==
As of the December 2024 timetable change, the following services stop at Hüswil:

- Lucerne S-Bahn S6/S7: hourly service between Langenthal and Lucerne. S7 trains operate combined with a RegioExpress between Wolhusen and Lucerne.

== Gallery ==
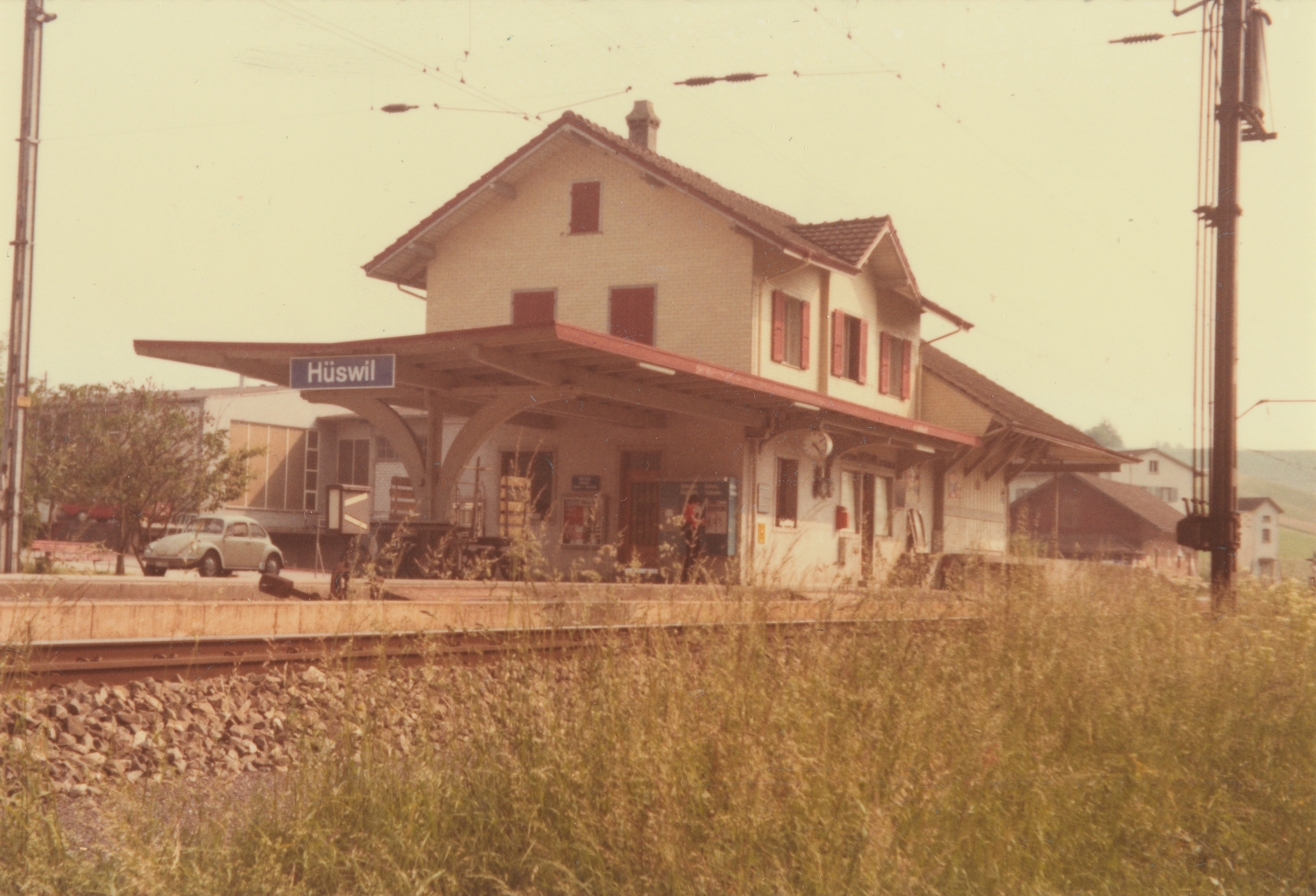
station building, ca. 1977

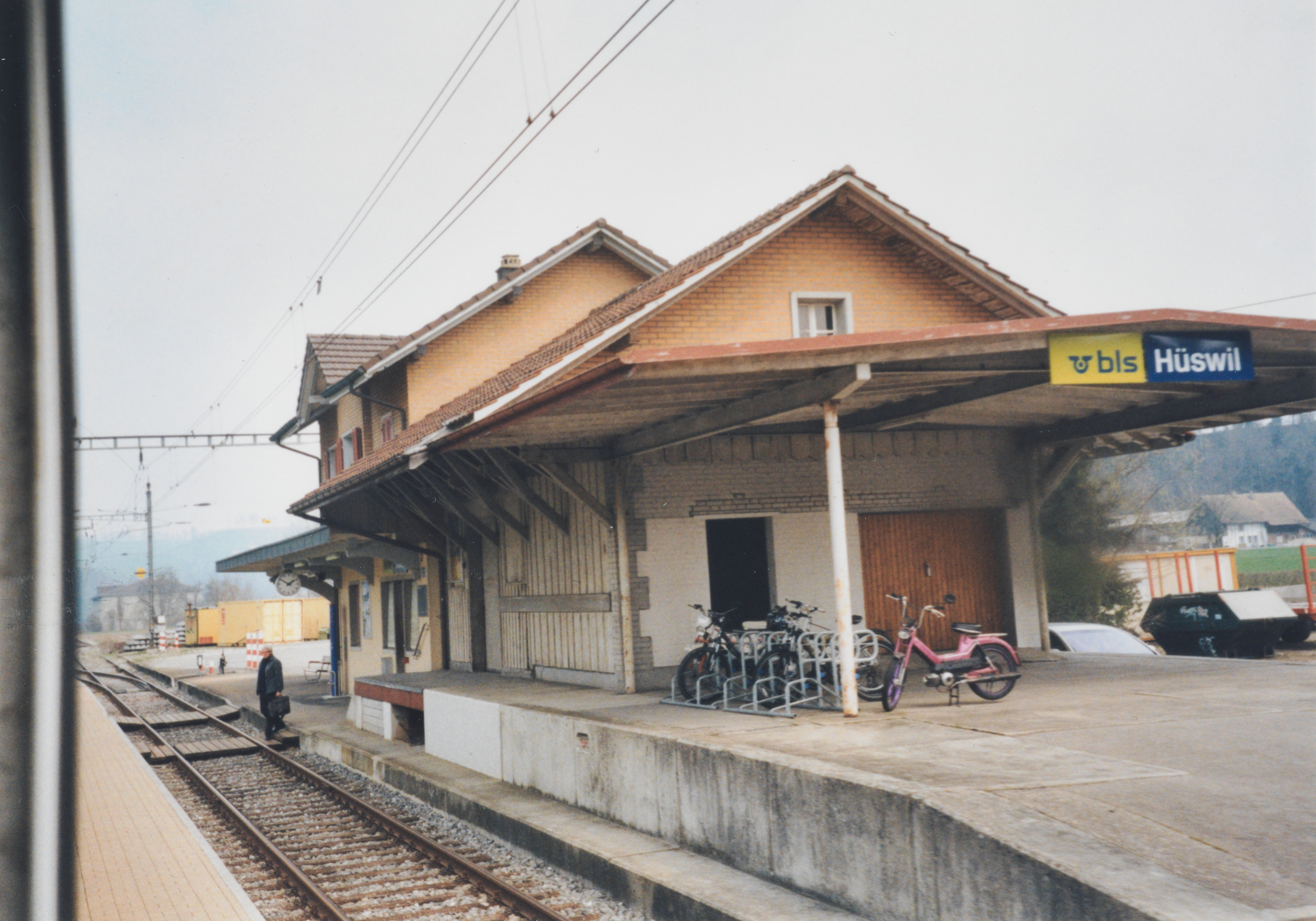
station building, 2010
