= BLS RABe 525 =

Swiss electric multiple unit train

RABe 525
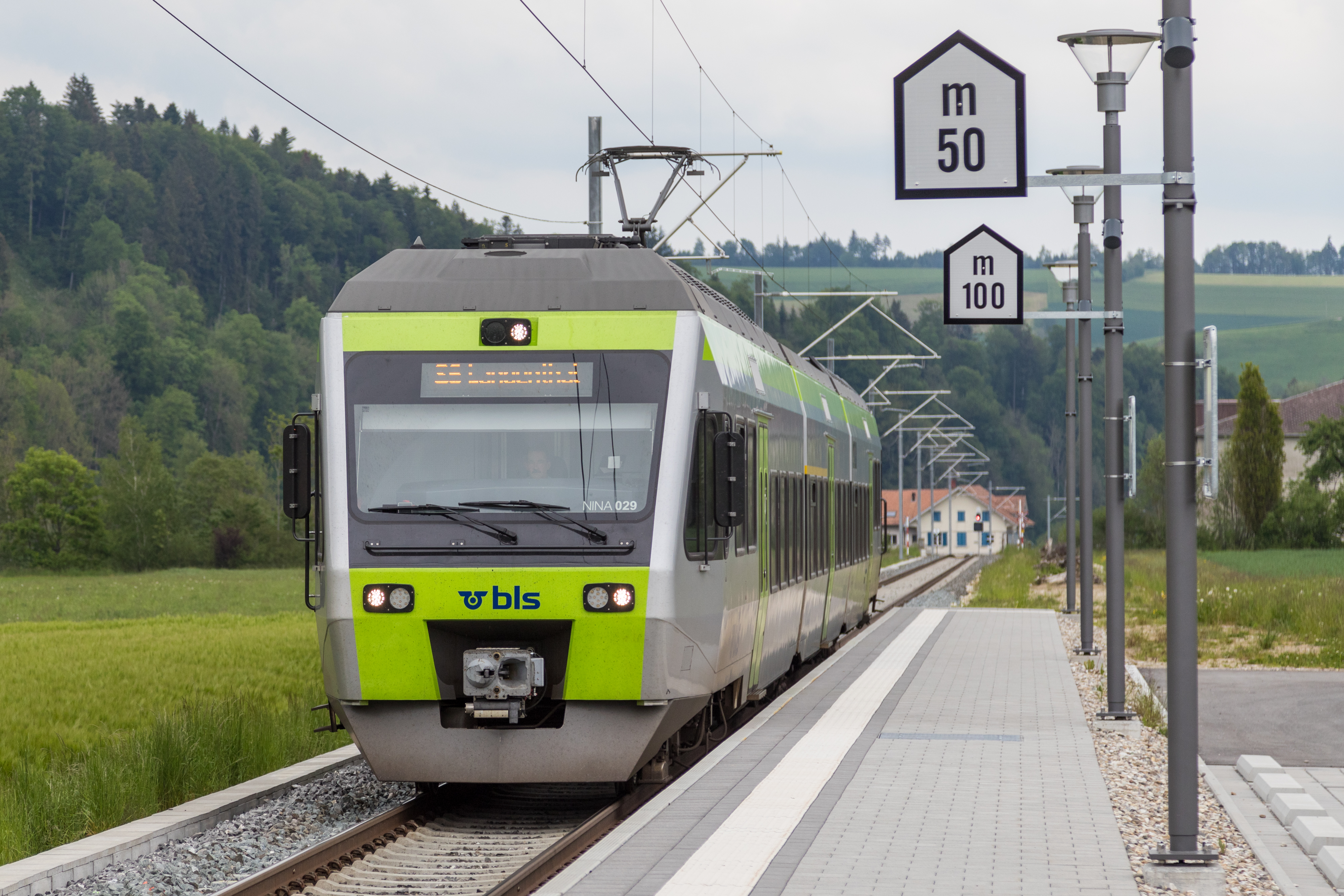
- BLS No. 029 at Hüswil in 2019
- Stock type: Electric multiple unit
- In service: 1998–present
- Manufacturers: Vevey Technologies (1998–2001); Bombardier (from 2001); Alstom/Traxis (formerly Holec)
- Refurbished: 2015-2019
- Number built: 37
- Number in service: 36
- Number scrapped: 1
- Fleet numbers: 001–014, 028–030, 032–037 (3 car units); 015-027 (4 car units)
- Capacity: 134 seated + 70 standees (3 car unit); 179 seated + 85 standees (4 car unit)
- Operator: BLS AG

Specifications
- Train length: 47.7 m (156 ft) (3 car unit); 61.9 m (203 ft) (4 car unit)
- Width: 3,030 mm (9.94 ft)
- Height: 4,315 mm (14.157 ft)
- Articulated sections: 3 or 4
- Wheel diameter: powered: 750/680 mm non-powered: 630/560 mm
- Wheelbase: powered: 2500 mm non-powered: 2700 mm
- Maximum speed: 140 km/h (87 mph)
- Weight: 79 t (3 car unit); 96 t (4 car unit)
- Traction system: 3-phase (IGBT-VVVF)
- Traction motors: 4-pole asynchronous 3-phase motor
- Power output: 4× 256 kW
- Tractive effort: 105 kN
- Gear ratio: 1 : 4,376
- Acceleration: 1,2 m/s^{2}
- Deceleration: 1,3 - 1,9 m/s^{2}
- Electric system: 15 kV 16.7 Hz AC
- UIC classification: Bo'2'2'Bo' / Bo'2'2'2'Bo'
- Minimum turning radius: 100 m
- Track gauge: 1,435 mm (4 ft 8 1/2 in)

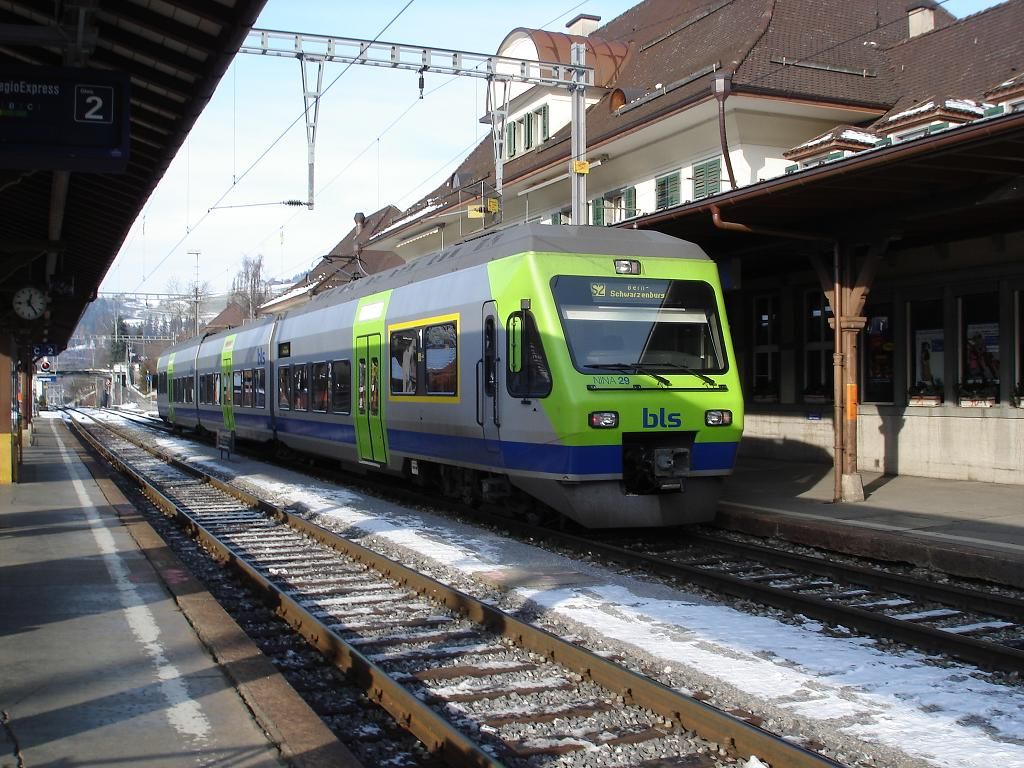
A BLS RABe 525 Nina train in Langnau im Emmental railway station

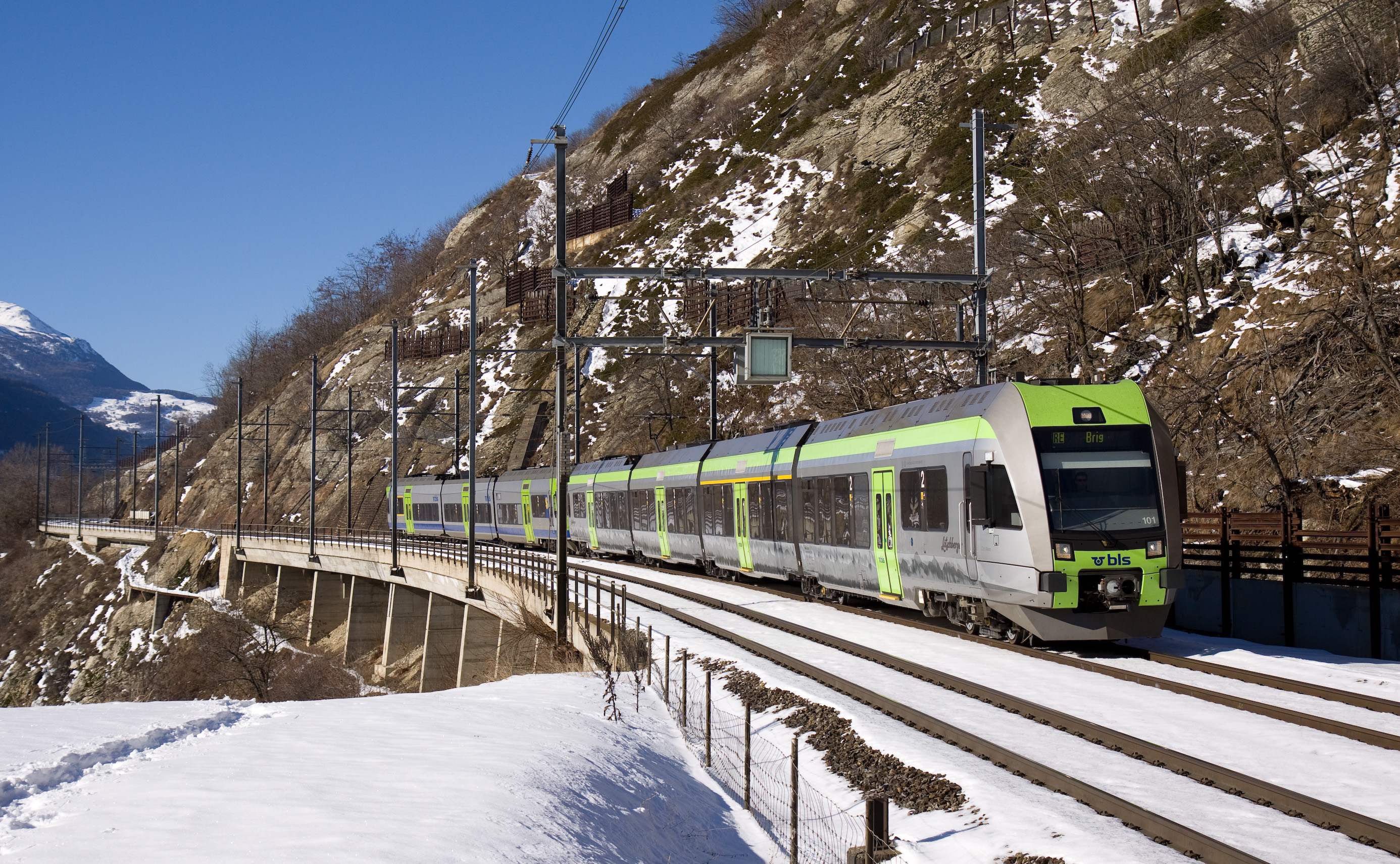
A BLS RABe 535 Lötschberger in multiple unit with a Nina

The BLS RABe 525, also known as NINA or Nina, is a Swiss electric multiple unit built by Bombardier Transportation with electrical equipment by Alstom. The train is principally used by the BLS AG on Bern S-Bahn services, four units (525 038-041) belong to RegionAlps. An updated version exists as the BLS RABe 535, also known as Lötschberger, also exists with a revised front end and an interior intended for longer distance services.

== Design ==
The articulated trainset was designed to be built with from two to six sections and with two to six motorized axles. The 3 car units have a length of 47.7 metres (156 ft 6 in), they are 3,030 millimetres (9 ft 11 in) wide and 4,315 millimetres (14 ft 1.9 in) tall. It has 20 first class seats and 114 second class seats as well as 70 standing places. The 4 car units have a length of 61.9 metres (203 ft 1 in), they are 3,030 millimetres (9 ft 11 in) wide and 4,315 millimetres (14 ft 1.9 in) tall. It has 20 first class seats and 159 second class seats as well as 85 standing places. The design speed is 140 km/h (87 mph). The RABe 525 and 535 are technically equal in terms of traction equipment.

== Operation ==
The RABe 525 is used on the following routes:

- S36 Lyss–Büren an der Aare
- S42 Hasle-Rüegsau–Konolfingen–Thun
- S44/S45 Thun–Belp–Bern–Burgdorf–Ramsei-Sumiswald-Grünen
- S46 Solothurn–Burgdorf–Ostermundigen
- S5 Bern–Kerzers–Neuchâtel + Murten/Morat–Payerne
- S6/S7 Lucerne–Wolhusen–Huttwil–Langenthal
- S77 Lucerne–Wolhusen–Willisau
- RE2 Domodossola–Brig–Visp

== Refit program ==
Between 2015 and 2019, BLS modernised its entire Nina fleet. The 1st class is no longer in the high-floor compartment, but has been moved to the low-floor area. The lighting has also been adapted so that all compartments are well lit. The toilets were also be slightly adapted. A standing area was created in 2nd class and the colour scheme inside and outside the vehicles was standardised so that all trains have the same design. The refit was completed in June 2019.

== Named units ==
BLS initially named the NINA after bodies of water. Later, "Wankdorf" was added as a stop and "Konolfingen" was the first place with a coat of arms. After the refit, two more NINAs were baptised with the coats of arms of towns.

Only the baptised vehicles are listed:

Unit	Name	Image
525 001	La Thielle/Zihl ^{[1]}	BLS RABe 525 001
525 002	Schwarzwasser ^{[1]}	BLS RABe 525 002
525 003	Emme ^{[1]}	BLS RABe 525 003
525 004	La Broye ^{[1]}	BLS RABe 525 004
525 005	Aare ^{[1]}	BLS RABe 525 005
525 005	Menznau ^{[2]}	BLS RABe 525 005
525 006	Gürbe ^{[1]}	BLS RABe 525 006
525 006	Willisau ^{[2]}	BLS RABe 525 006
525 007	Gäbelbach ^{[1]}	BLS RABe 525 007
525 007	Huttwil ^{[2]}	BLS RABe 525 007
525 008	La Sarine/Saane ^{[1]}	BLS RABe 525 008
525 009	Schwarzsee ^{[1]}	BLS RABe 525 009
525 010	Gerzensee ^{[1]}	BLS RABe 525 010
525 010	LINA	BLS RABe 525 010

Unit	Name	Image
525 011	Müntschemier ^{[2]}	BLS RABe 525 011
525 012	Mühleberg ^{[2]}	BLS RABe 525 012
525 013	Konolfingen ^{[1]} ^{[2]}	BLS RABe 525 013
525 014	Wohlensee ^{[1]}	BLS RABe 525 014
525 017	Grabebach ^{[1]}	BLS RABe 525 017
525 018	Thunersee ^{[1]}	BLS RABe 525 018
525 020	Scherlibach ^{[1]}	BLS RABe 525 020
525 022	Worble ^{[1]}	BLS RABe 525 022
525 026	Chräbsbach ^{[1]}	BLS RABe 525 026
525 027	Glütschbach ^{[1]}	BLS RABe 525 027
525 028	La Bibera/Bibere ^{[1]}	BLS RABe 525 028
525 033	Wankdorf ^{[1]} ^{[3]}	BLS RABe 525 033

^{1} Baptism name removed after modernisation
^{2} Municipal coat of arms instead of rivers
^{3} Station instead of river

== Bibliography ==
- Josef Stöckli, Hans Vorburger: Die Niederflur-Nahverkehrs-Pendelzüge RABe 525 „NINA“ der BLS, TMR und TRN. In: Eisenbahn-Revue International, Heft 2/2003, ISSN 1421-2811, S. 68–79.
