= Langenthal Süd railway station =

Railway station in Langenthal, Switzerland

Langenthal Süd
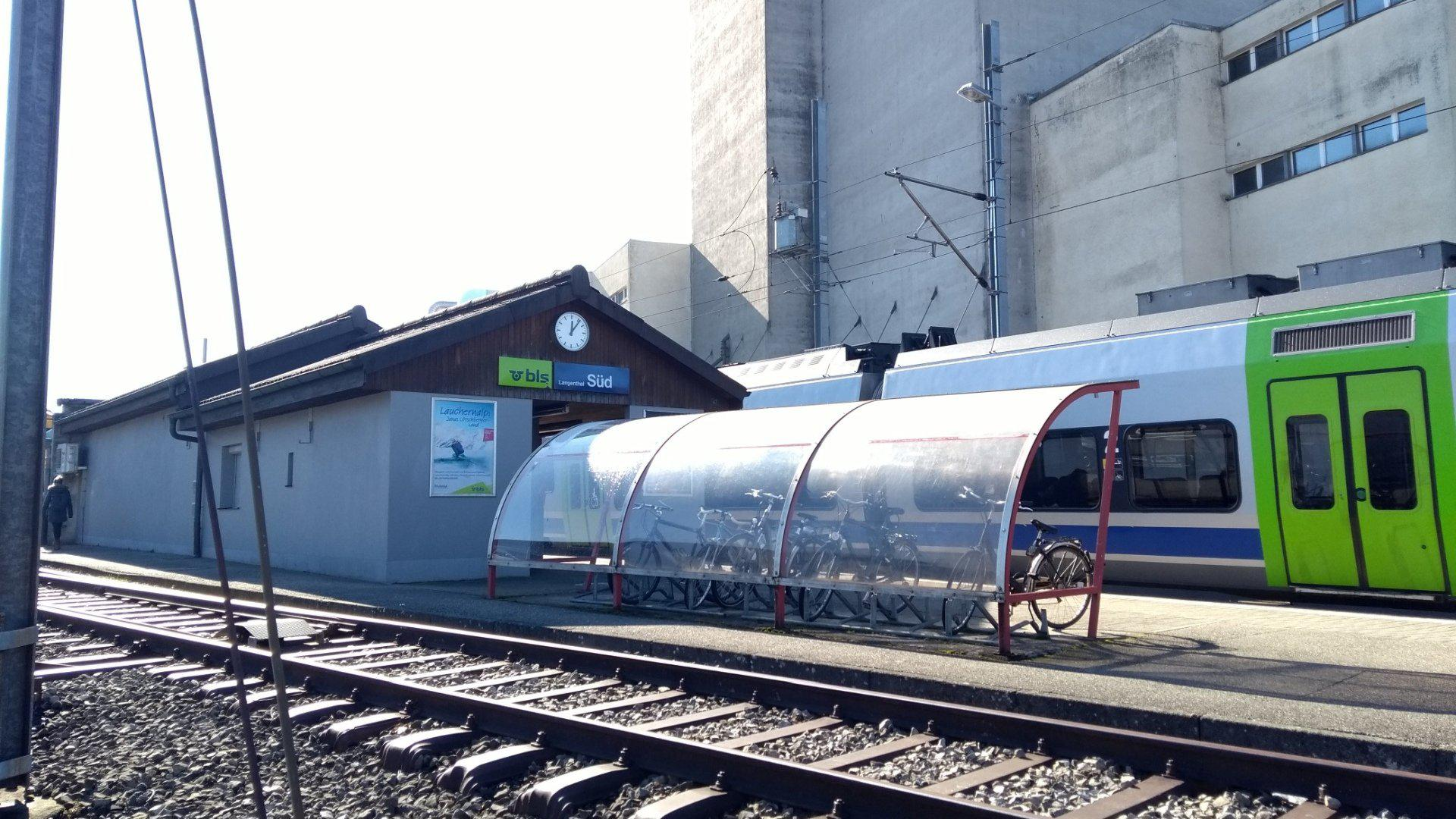
- The station in 2018

General information
- Location: Langenthal; Switzerland
- Coordinates: 47°12′18″N 7°46′48″E
- Elevation: 483 m (1,585 ft)
- Owner: BLS AG
- Line: Langenthal–Huttwil line
- Distance: 1.6 km (0.99 mi) from Langenthal
- Platforms: 1 side platform
- Tracks: 1
- Train operators: BLS AG
- Connections: Aare Seeland mobil bus line

Construction
- Accessible: No

Other information
- Station code: 8508181 (LTHS)
- Fare zone: 190 (Libero)

Passengers
- 2023: 300 per weekday (BLS)

Services
| Preceding station | Lucerne S-Bahn | Following station |
|---|---|---|
| Langenthal Terminus | S6 | Lotzwil towards Lucerne |
| Langenthal Terminus | S7 | Lotzwil towards Lucerne |
Location

Langenthal Süd railway station (German: Bahnhof Langenthal Süd) is a railway station in the municipality of Langenthal, in the Swiss canton of Bern. It is an intermediate stop on the standard gauge Langenthal–Huttwil line of BLS AG.

== Services ==
As of the December 2024 timetable change, the following services stop at Langenthal Süd:

- Lucerne S-Bahn S6/S7: half-hourly service (hourly on Sundays) between Langenthal and Lucerne. S7 trains operate combined with a RegioExpress between Wolhusen and Lucerne.
