= Huttwil railway station =

Railway station in Huttwil, Switzerland

Huttwil
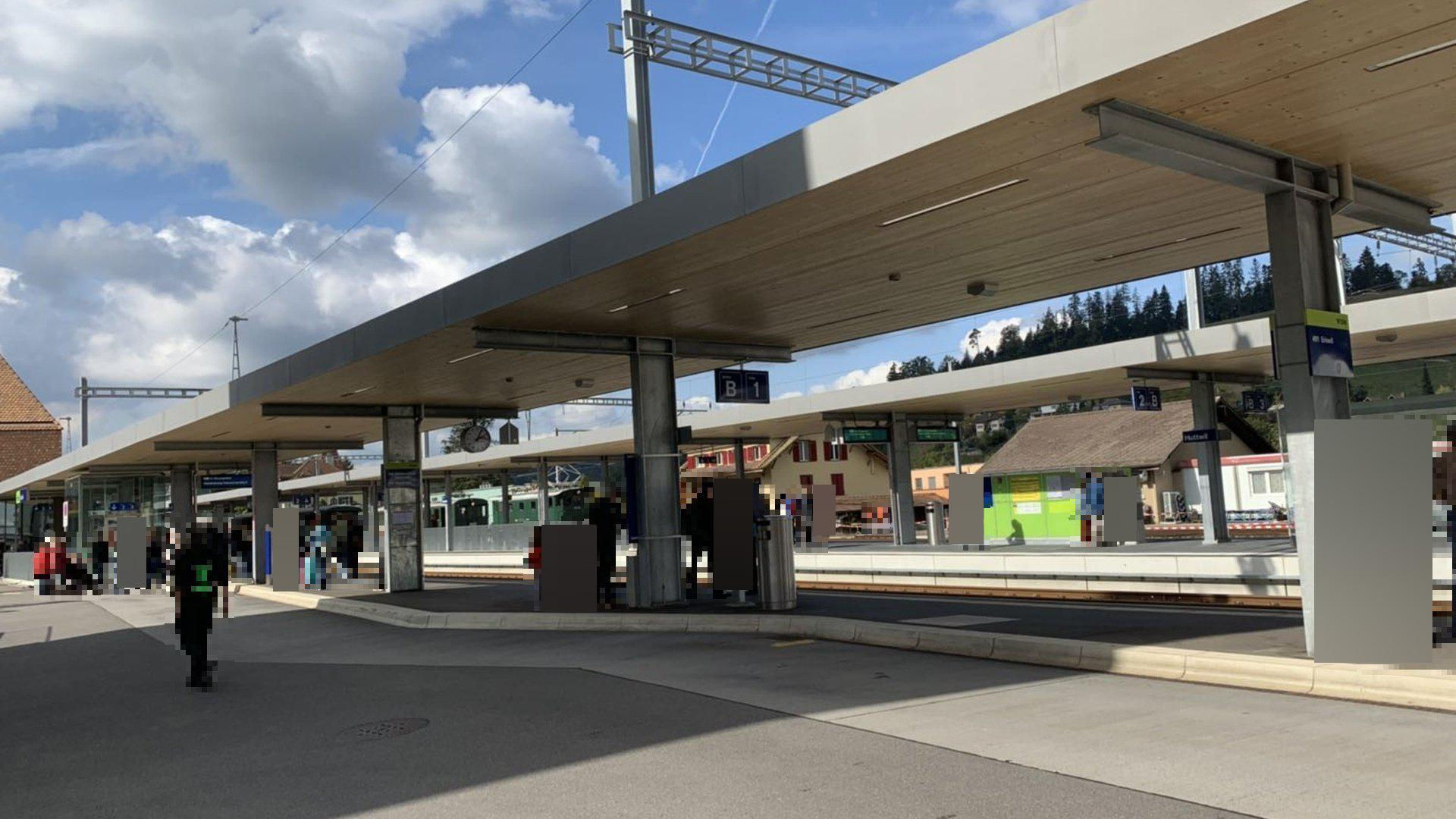
- The station platforms in 2018

General information
- Location: Huttwil; Switzerland
- Coordinates: 47°06′54″N 7°50′35″E
- Elevation: 638 m (2,093 ft)
- Owner: BLS AG
- Lines: Huttwil–Wolhusen line; Langenthal–Huttwil line; Ramsei–Huttwil line
- Distance: 14.09 km (8.76 mi) from Langenthal; 19.46 km (12.09 mi) from Ramsei
- Platforms: 3: 1 island platform; 1 side platform
- Tracks: 3
- Train operators: BLS AG; Dampfbahn Bern
- Connections: Busland AG buses; Bürgerbus Gondiswil-Huttwil-Ufhusen

Construction
- Accessible: Yes

Other information
- Station code: 8508187 (HWIL)
- Fare zone: 180 (Libero)

Passengers
- 2023: 1'500 per weekday (BLS)

Services
Preceding station	Lucerne S-Bahn	Following station
Rohrbach towards Langenthal	S6	Hüswil towards Lucerne
Rohrbach towards Langenthal	S7	Hüswil towards Lucerne
Preceding station	Dampfbahn Bern	Following station
Huttwil Sportzentrum towards Sumiswald-Grünen	Sumiswald-Grünen to Huttwil	Terminus
Location

Huttwil railway station (German: Bahnhof Huttwil) is a railway station in the municipality of Huttwil, in the Swiss canton of Bern. It is located at the junction of three standard gauge railway lines of BLS AG: Huttwil–Wolhusen, Langenthal–Huttwil, and Ramsei–Huttwil. Combined, the first two lines form the main line between Langenthal and Wolhusen, and on to Lucerne. The Ramsei–Huttwil line sees no service except for seasonal service to Sumiswald-Grünen operated by the Dampfbahn Bern heritage railway.

== Services ==
As of the December 2024 timetable change, the following services stop at Huttwil:

- Lucerne S-Bahn S6/S7: half-hourly service (hourly on Sundays) between Langenthal and Lucerne. S7 trains operate combined with a RegioExpress between Wolhusen and Lucerne.
- Dampfbahn Bern: two round-trips one Sunday per month between June and October to Sumiswald-Grünen.
