= Huttwil–Wolhusen railway line =

Railway line in Switzerland

Huttwil–Wolhusen
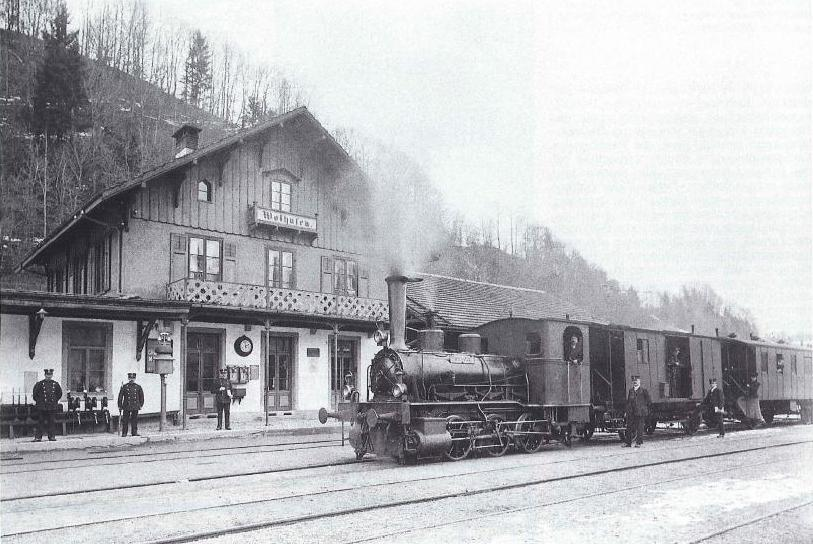
- HWB train hauled by locomotive No. 2 of the LHB in Wolhusen

Overview
- Owner: BLS
- Line number: 440
- Termini: Huttwil; Wolhusen

Technical
- Line length: 25.23 km (15.68 mi)
- Number of tracks: 1
- Track gauge: 1,435 mm (4 ft 8 1/2 in)
- Electrification: 15 kV 16.7 Hz AC overhead catenary
- Maximum incline: 2.5%

The Huttwil–Wolhusen railway line is a single-track standard-gauge railway line in Switzerland and currently operated by BLS AG. It was built by the Huttwil-Wolhusen-Bahn (HWB), based in Willisau, and opened on 9 May 1895. Operations were managed by the Langenthal-Huttwil-Bahn (LHB), which owned and operated the Langenthal–Huttwil railway. On 1 January 1944, the HWB was merged into the Vereinigte Huttwil-Bahnen (United Huttwil Railways, VHB), which was later merged into BLS AG.

== History ==
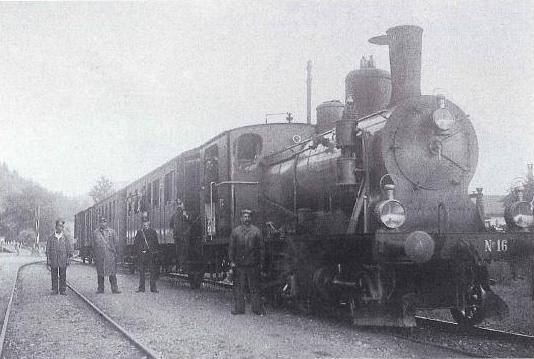
HWB train hauled by locomotive Ed 3/4 16 in about 1920 in Menznau

The initiators of the Huttwil-Wolhusen-Bahn, which were mainly politicians from the Willisau District, saw their project in the 1870s as part of through route that would have connected France and the Gotthard Railway (Gotthardbahn, GB) at Altdorf by the shortest route via Delle, Delémont, Balsthal, Langenthal, Huttwil, Wolhusen, Lucerne and Stans. However, the Jura-Gotthard-Bahn (Jura-Gotthard Railway) project was not completed.

Shortly after the opening of the Langenthal–Huttwil railway by the Langenthal-Huttwil-Bahn, a new initiative committee received a concession for the Huttwil–Wolhusen line on 10 April 1890. The main investor in the railway company, which was founded on 29 March 1893, was the Canton of Lucerne. In addition, the Canton of Bern and various communities participated in the railway. The HWB transferred the operation and maintenance of the Huttwil–Wolhusen line under contract to the LHB on 23/24 June 1894. This allowed the rolling stock of the two railway companies to be used over the whole Langenthal–Wolhusen line. Construction began in the summer of 1893. The opening, which was originally planned for 1 March 1895, was delayed and operations did not begin until 9 May 1895.

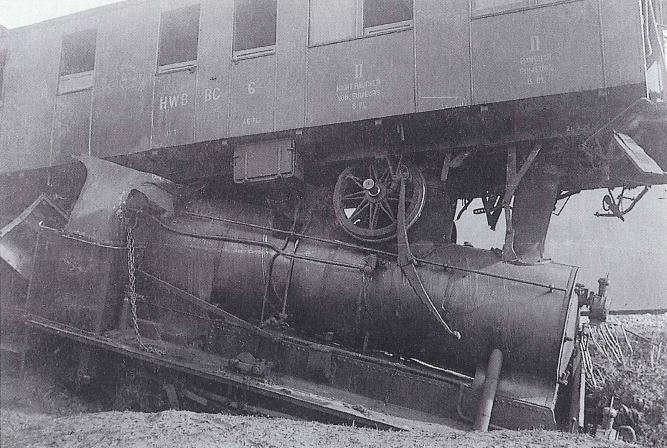
Railway accident in Willisau on 20 March 1923 with locomotive Ed 3/4 22 of the RSHB and second/third class carriage BC 6 of the HWB

The HWB acquired steam locomotive Eb 3/4, listed as number 4, from the Bern-Neuenburg-Bahn (Bern-Neuchâtel Railway) in 1930. However, it proved unsuitable and was scrapped in 1937. Steam locomotive Ec 3/3 5, which was built as a tram engine, began operations in 1936. This high-performance machine, known as the Motorlokomotive was operated by one man and allowed very economical operations. After electrification, it was sold to Sulzer, where it was used as a factory locomotive. Today it is owned by the Historic Heritage Foundation of the Swiss Federal Railways (SBB Historic).

In order to obtain federal aid for rail electrification, the HWB merged with the LHB and the Ramsei-Sumiswald-Huttwil-Bahn (RSHB) on 1 January 1944 to form the United Huttwil Railways (Vereinigten Huttwil-Bahnen, VHB), which immediately formed a joint venture called the EBT Group with the Emmental-Burgdorf-Thun-Bahn (EBT) and the Solothurn-Münster Bahn (SMB). The VHB commenced electrical operations on the Huttwil–Hüswil section at 15 kV AC 16 2/3 Hz on 6 August 1945. Electric trains have run on the whole line to Wolhusen since 7 December 1945. The VHB merged with the other railways of the EBT Group in 1997 to form the Regionalverkehr Mittelland (RM), which was merged in turn with the BLS AG in 2006.

== Operations ==
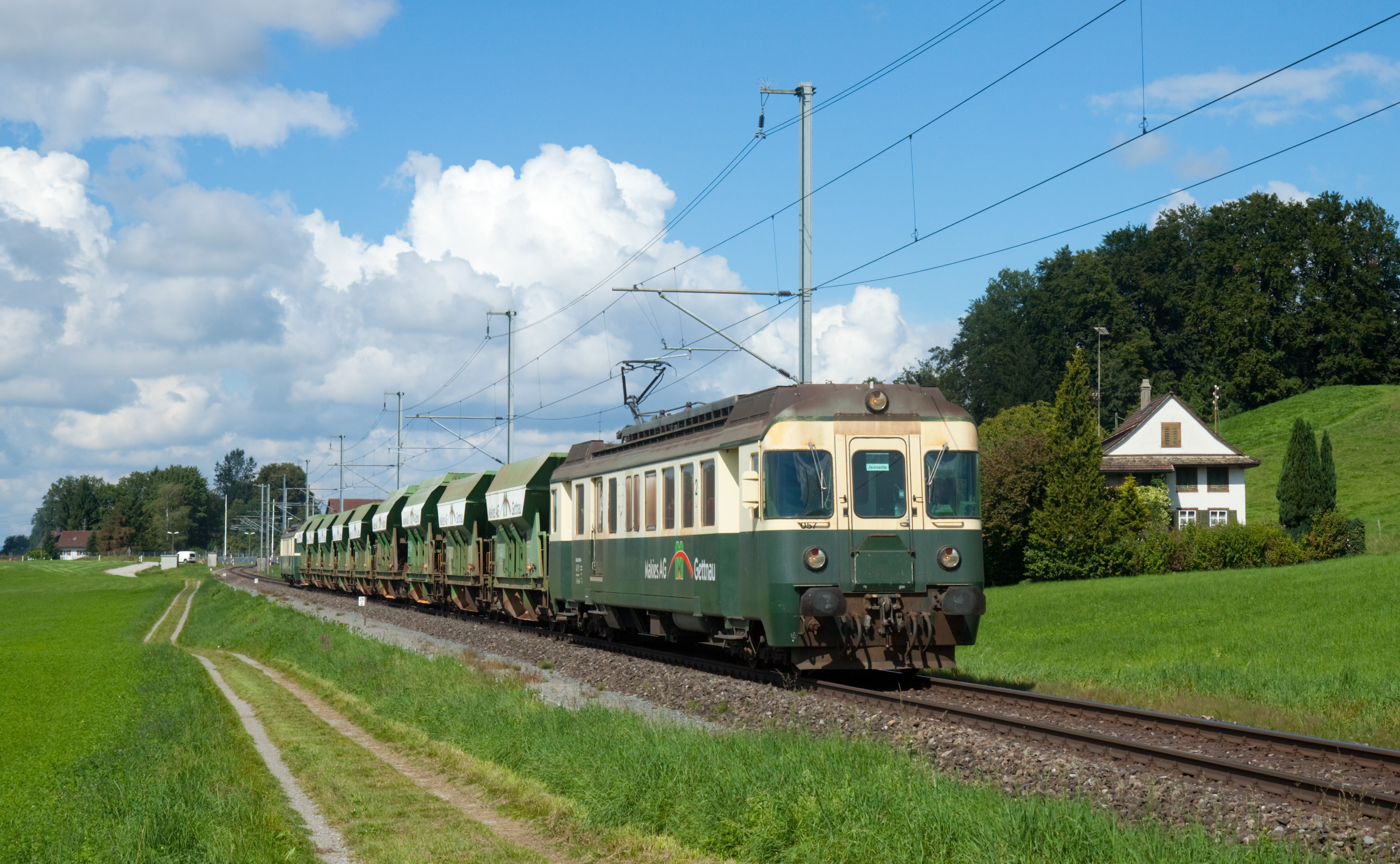
Makies gravel train propelled by BDe 576 057 and 056 railcars. The railcars are of the same design as the BDe 4/4 251 and 252 railcars procured in 1966, but have a somewhat different front.

The Wolhusen–Huttwil line has been served hourly by three-part NINA EMUs since the timetable change in 2013. It is part of line S6 of the Lucerne S-Bahn, which runs between Lucerne and Langenthal as part of a portion worked train. The other half of the train runs from Wolhusen to Langnau. On the Wolhusen–Willisau section the timetable is complemented by S7 services, which run every half hour at peak times to Langenthal. It uses the same rolling stock as the S6.

Feight traffic still also plays an important role. The Makies company transports gravel from Zell to the gravel works in Gettnau. It acquired four BDe 4/4 railcars from the Südostbahn (SOB) for this role, with one serving as a source of spare parts. A double-track section between Gettnau and Gettnau freight yard has facilitated operations since 8 December 2006.
