= Langenthal–Huttwil railway =

Railway line in Switzerland

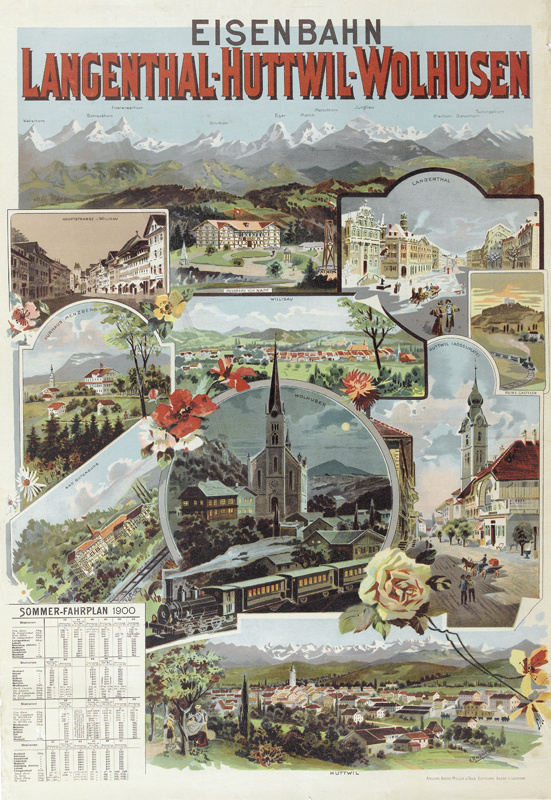
- Poster advertising the Langenthal–Huttwil–Wolhusen line

Overview
- Owner: BLS
- Line number: 440
- Termini: Langenthal; Huttwil

Technical
- Line length: 25.60 km (15.91 mi)
- Number of tracks: 1 (2: Madiswil–Lindenholz)
- Track gauge: 1,435 mm (4 ft 8 1/2 in)
- Electrification: 15 kV 16.7 Hz AC overhead catenary

The Langenthal–Huttwil railway is a single-track standard-gauge line in Switzerland and currently operated by BLS AG. It was built by the Langenthal-Huttwil-Bahn (LHB) and opened in 1889. On 1 January 1944, the LHB was merged into the Vereinigte Huttwil-Bahnen (United Huttwil Railways, VHB), which was later merged into BLS AG.

== Project and opening ==
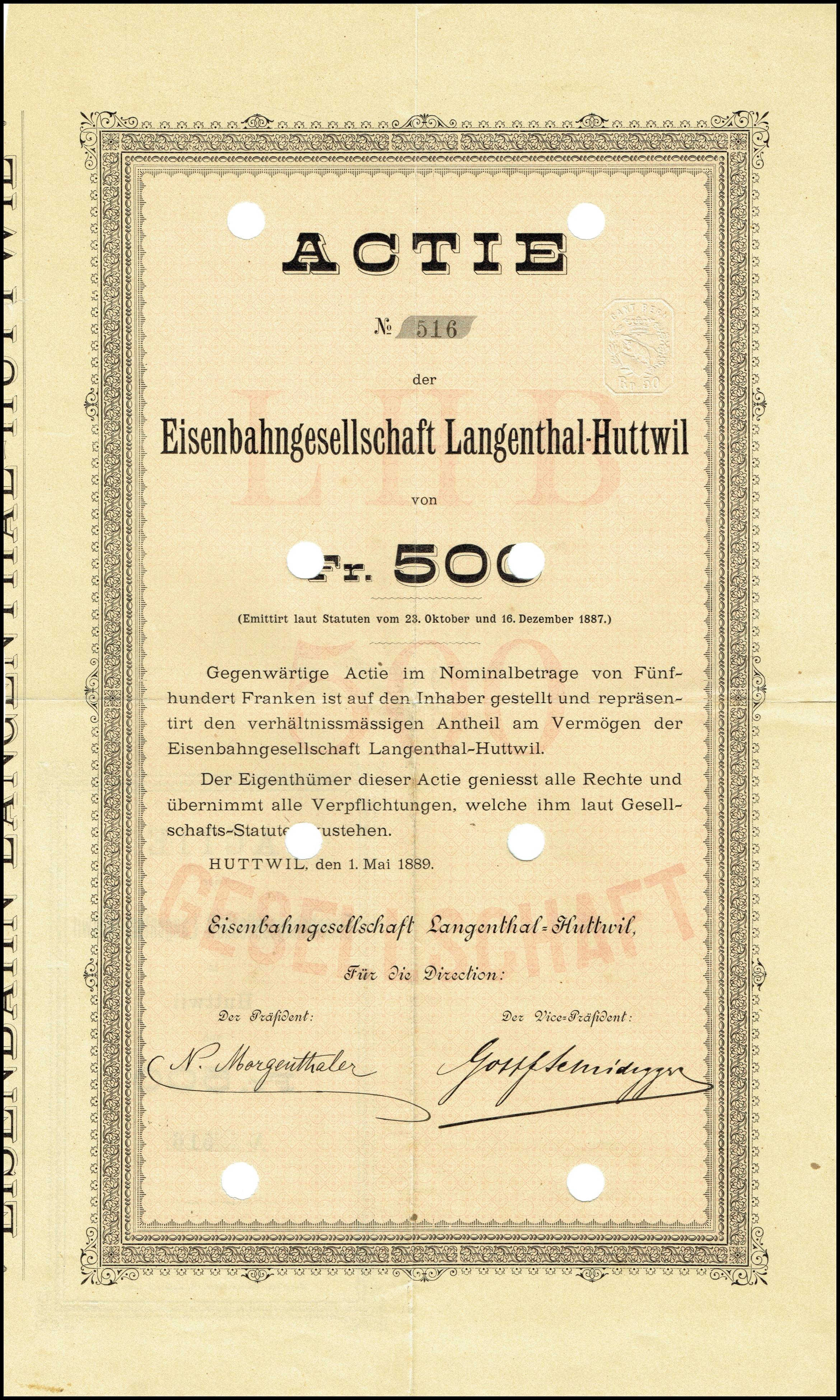
Share of the Eisenbahngesellschaft Langenthal-Huttwil, issued 1 May 1889

The Langenthal–Huttwil railway was originally conceived as part of an ambitious plan in the 1870s. The Jura-Gotthard-Bahn (Jura-Gotthard Railway) would have been a through route that would have connected France and the Gotthard Railway (Gotthardbahn, GB) at Altdorf by the shortest route via Delle, Delémont, Balsthal, Langenthal, Huttwil, Wolhusen, Lucerne and Stans. The LHB was able to commence operations on its standard gauge line from Langenthal to Huttwil on 1 November 1889. The first trip took place the day before, although the operating permit was not received until the evening.

== Operations ==
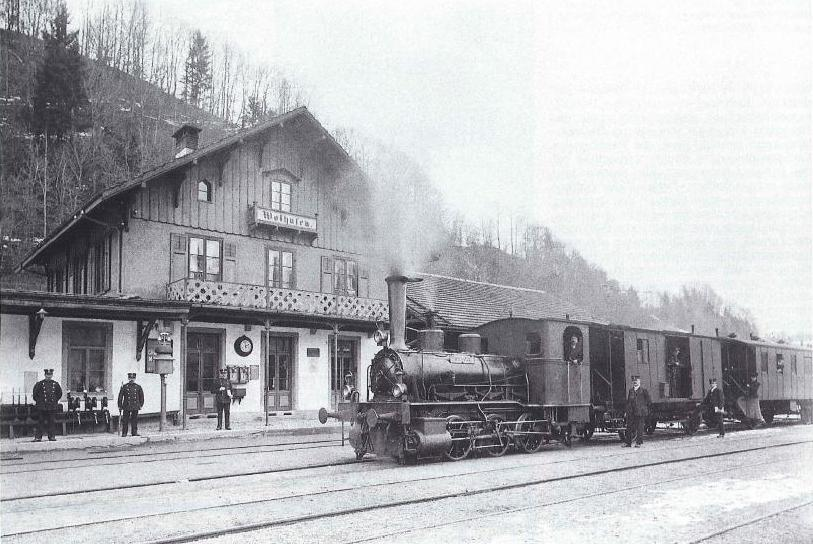
Locomotive No. 2 of the LHB in Wolhusen

From its opening on 9 May 1895, the LHB also operated services on the Huttwil–Wolhusen railway on behalf of the Huttwil-Wolhusen-Bahn (HWB). The rolling stock of the two railway companies could thus be used over the whole route from Langenthal to Wolhusen. Operations on the Ramsei–Huttwil railway, opened on 1 June 1908 by the Ramsei-Sumiswald-Huttwil-Bahn (RSHB), were also the responsibility of the LHB.

On 1 January 1927, the LHB merged with the Huttwil-Eriswil-Bahn (HEB); the LHB had been responsible for its operations since its opening on 1 September 1915, The frugal steam railcars of the HEB also operated on the Langenthal–Wolhusen route.

== Operating results ==
Although the LHB was never more than a local railway, it always had positive operating results. Until the First World War, the income from passenger and freight traffic was roughly balanced.

== Merger with the United Huttwil Railways ==
In order to obtain federal aid for rail electrification, the LHB merged with the HWB and the RSHB on 1 January 1944 to form the United Huttwil Railways (Vereinigten Huttwil-Bahnen, VHB), which immediately formed a joint venture called the EBT Group with the Emmental-Burgdorf-Thun-Bahn (EBT) and the Solothurn-Münster Bahn (SMB). The VHB commenced electrical operations on the Langenthal–Huttwil line at 15 kV AC 16 2/3 Hertz on 8 July 1945. The double-track section between Madiswil and Lindenholz was placed into operation on 18 June 1996. The VHB merged with the other railways of the EBT Group in 1997 to form the Regionalverkehr Mittelland (RM), which was merged in turn with the BLS AG in 2006.

== Current operations ==
The Langenthal–Huttwil line is served hourly by line S6 of the Lucerne S-Bahn, which runs between Lucerne and Langenthal as part of a portion worked train. The other half of the train runs from Wolhusen to Langnau. With the additional S7 service operating on working days, the timetable operates at half-hourly intervals. During the peak hour, the S7 service runs continuously between Langenthal and Lucerne. It is portion worked in Wolhusen, with the other half of the train operated as a RegioExpress service to Bern. The S6 and S7 services use low-floor trains of the Nina class. The line between Langenthal and Wolhusen is also important for freight traffic consisting of gravel and timber.
