= Langenthal railway station =

Railway station in Langenthal, Switzerland

Langenthal
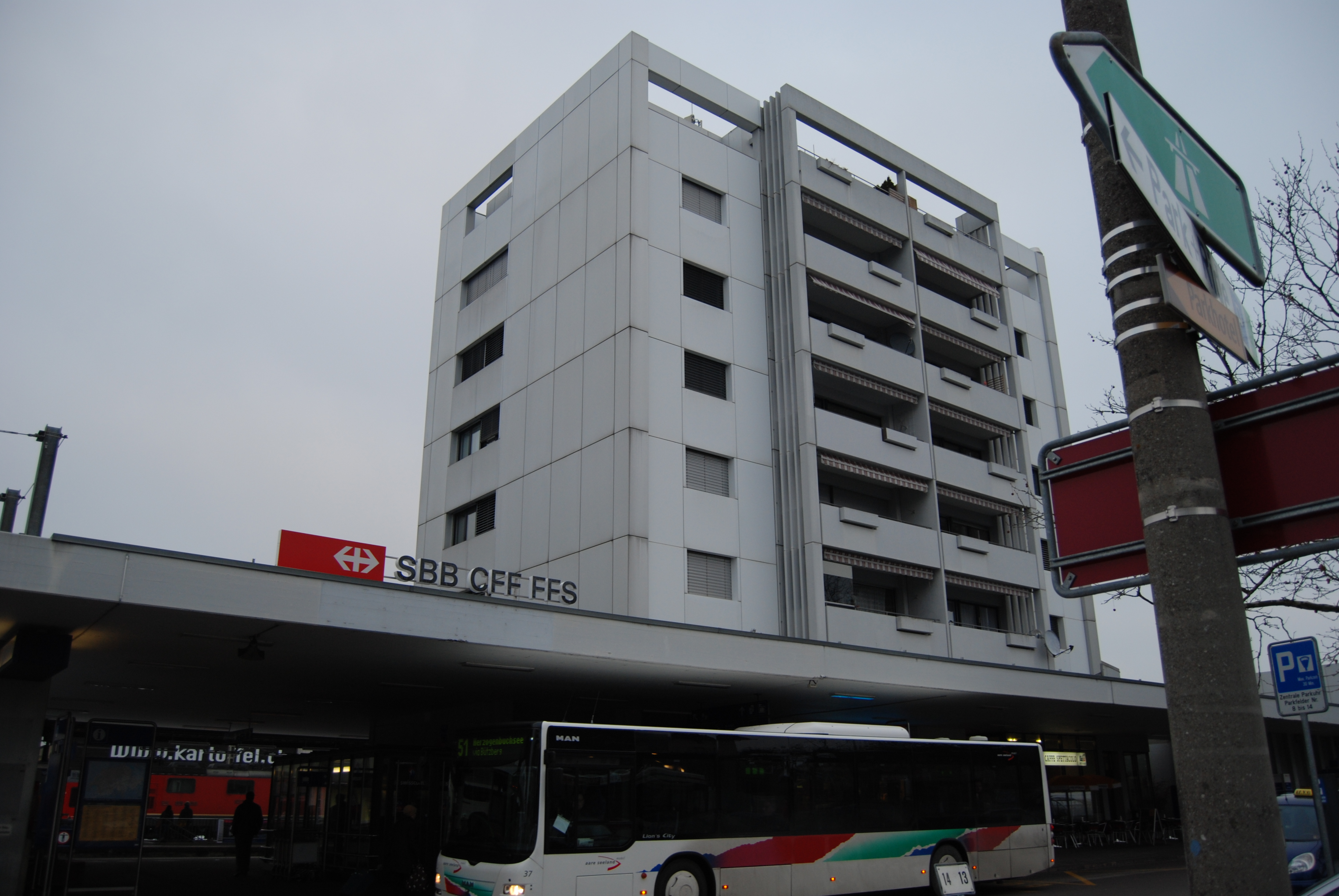
- The station in 2010

General information
- Location: Langenthal; Switzerland
- Coordinates: 47°13′02″N 7°47′05″E
- Elevation: 472 m (1,549 ft)
- Owner: Swiss Federal Railways
- Lines: Langenthal–Huttwil line; Langenthal–Oensingen line; Langenthal–Melchnau line; Olten–Bern line
- Tracks: 7
- Train operators: Aare Seeland mobil; BLS AG; Südostbahn; Swiss Federal Railways
- Connections: Aare Seeland mobil buses

Construction
- Parking: Yes (93 spaces)
- Cycle facilities: Yes
- Accessible: Yes

Other information
- Station code: 8508100 (LTH)
- Fare zone: 190 (Libero)

Passengers
- 2025: 10,500 per day (BLS, SBB, SOB (excludes asm))
- Rank: 73 out of 1,095

Services
Preceding station	Südostbahn	Following station
Herzogenbuchsee towards Bern	IR 35 Aare Linth	Olten towards Chur
Preceding station	BLS	Following station
Herzogenbuchsee towards Bern	IR 17	Olten Terminus
Preceding station	Aare Seeland mobil	Following station
Langenthal Gaswerk towards Solothurn	S11	Terminus
Langenthal Gaswerk towards St. Urban Ziegelei	S12	Terminus
Preceding station	Aargau S-Bahn	Following station
Terminus	S23	Roggwil-Wynau towards Baden
Preceding station	Lucerne S-Bahn	Following station
Terminus	S6	Langenthal Süd towards Lucerne
Terminus	S7	Langenthal Süd towards Lucerne
Location

Langenthal railway station (German: Bahnhof Langenthal) is a railway station in the municipality of Langenthal, in the Swiss canton of Bern. It is located at the junction of the standard gauge Langenthal–Huttwil line of BLS AG and Olten–Bern line of Swiss Federal Railways. The station is also the junction of the 1,000 mm (3 ft 3 3/8 in) gauge Langenthal–Oensingen and Langenthal–Melchnau lines of Aare Seeland mobil.

== Services ==
As of the December 2024 timetable change, the following services stop at Langenthal:

- InterRegio: half-hourly service between Olten and Bern and hourly service from Olten to Chur via Zürich Hauptbahnhof.
- S11: half-hourly service to Solothurn.
- S12: half-hourly service to St. Urban; every other train continues from St. Urban to St. Urban Ziegelei.
- Lucerne S-Bahn S6/S7: half-hourly service (hourly on Sundays) to Lucerne. S7 trains operate combined with a RegioExpress between Wolhusen and Lucerne.
- Aargau S-Bahn S23: half-hourly service to Olten; every other train continues to Baden.
