= Rothenburg Station railway station =

Swiss railway station

Rothenburg Station
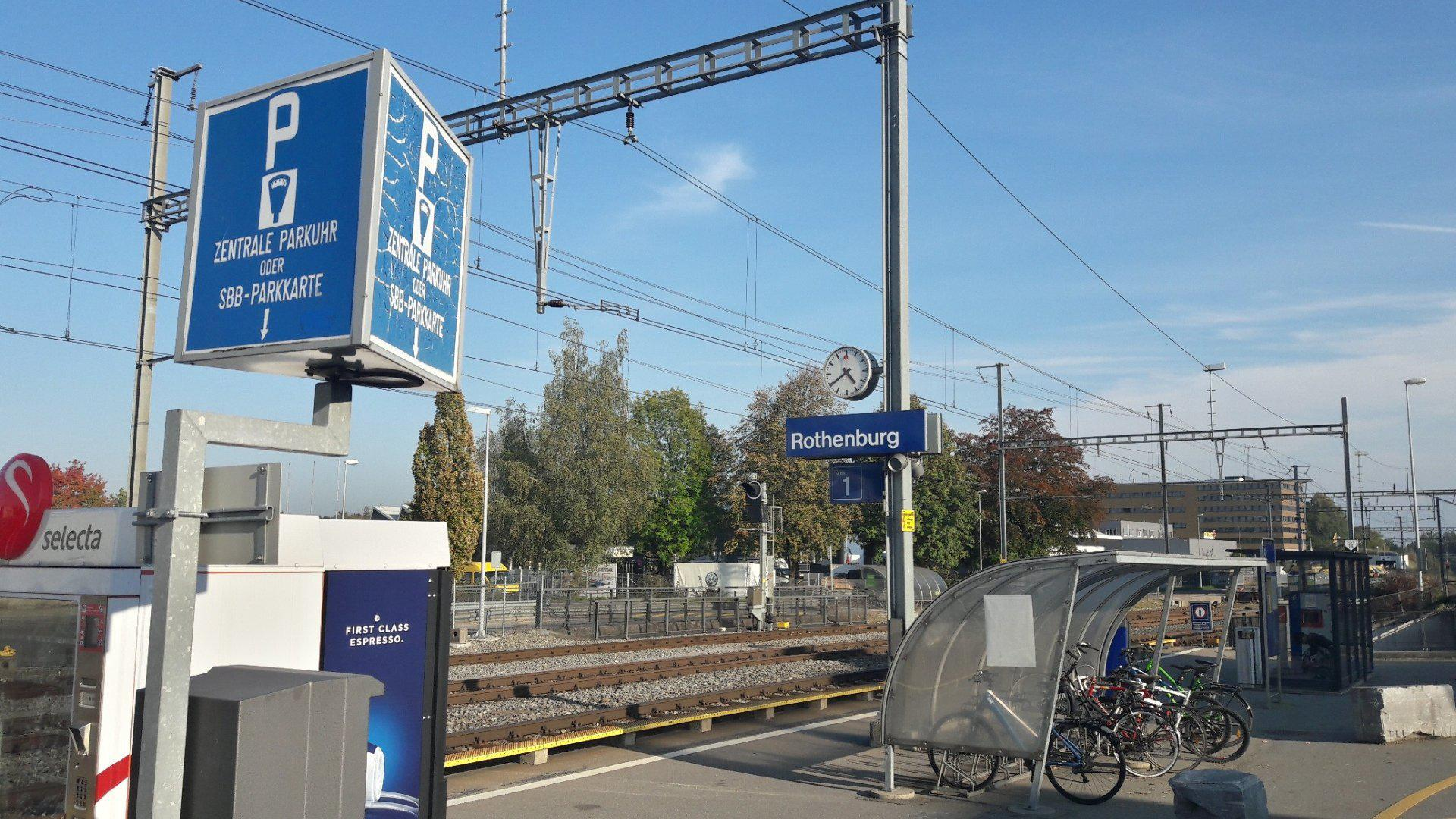
- The station platform in 2018

General information
- Location: Rothenburg; Switzerland
- Coordinates: 47°05′N 8°15′E
- Owner: Swiss Federal Railways
- Line: Olten–Lucerne line
- Train operators: Swiss Federal Railways

History
- Former names: Rothenburg

Services
Preceding station	SBB CFF FFS	Following station
Sempach-Neuenkirch towards Olten	RE24	Emmenbrücke towards Lucerne
Preceding station	Lucerne S-Bahn	Following station
Sempach-Neuenkirch towards Sursee	S1	Emmenbrücke Kapf towards Baar
Location

Rothenburg Station railway station (German: Bahnhof Rothenburg Station) is a railway station in the municipality of Rothenburg, in the Swiss canton of Lucerne. It is an intermediate stop on the standard gauge Olten–Lucerne line of Swiss Federal Railways. Until the December 2022 timetable change, the station was named Rothenburg. It is located south-west of the village of Rothenburg.

== Services ==
As of the December 2022 timetable change, the following services stop at Rothenburg Station:

- Lucerne S-Bahn S1: half-hourly service between Sursee and Baar.
