= Nottwil railway station =

Swiss railway station

Nottwil
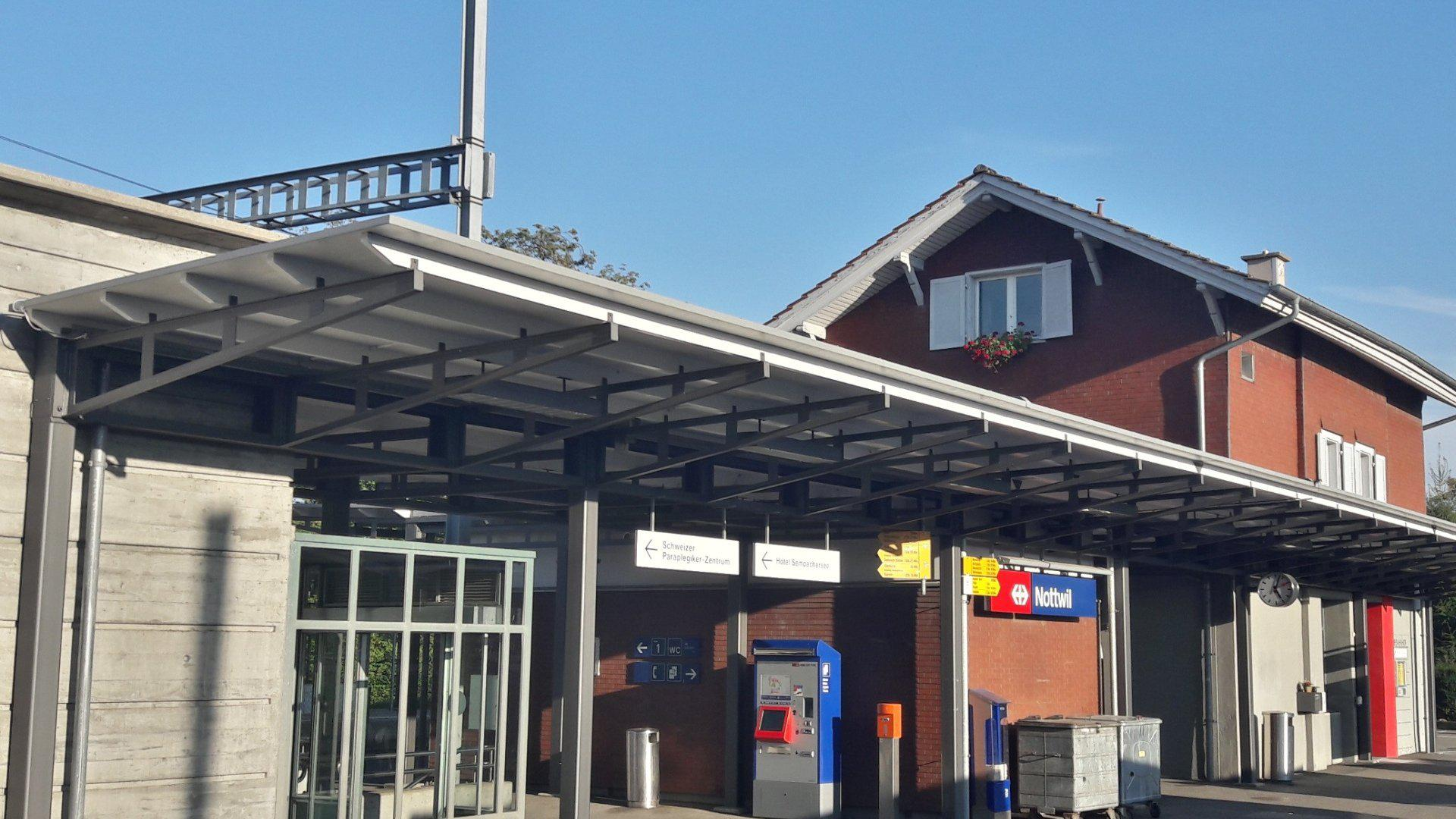
- The station building in 2018

General information
- Location: Nottwil; Switzerland
- Coordinates: 47°08′N 8°08′E
- Owner: Swiss Federal Railways
- Line: Olten–Lucerne line
- Train operators: Swiss Federal Railways

Services
Preceding station	Lucerne S-Bahn	Following station
Oberkirch towards Sursee	S1	Sempach-Neuenkirch towards Baar
Location
- Location within Switzerland Location within Canton of Lucerne

Nottwil railway station (German: Bahnhof Nottwil) is a railway station in the municipality of Nottwil, in the Swiss canton of Lucerne. It is an intermediate stop on the standard gauge Olten–Lucerne line of Swiss Federal Railways.

== Services ==
The following services stop at Nottwil:

- Lucerne S-Bahn S1: half-hourly service between Sursee and Baar.
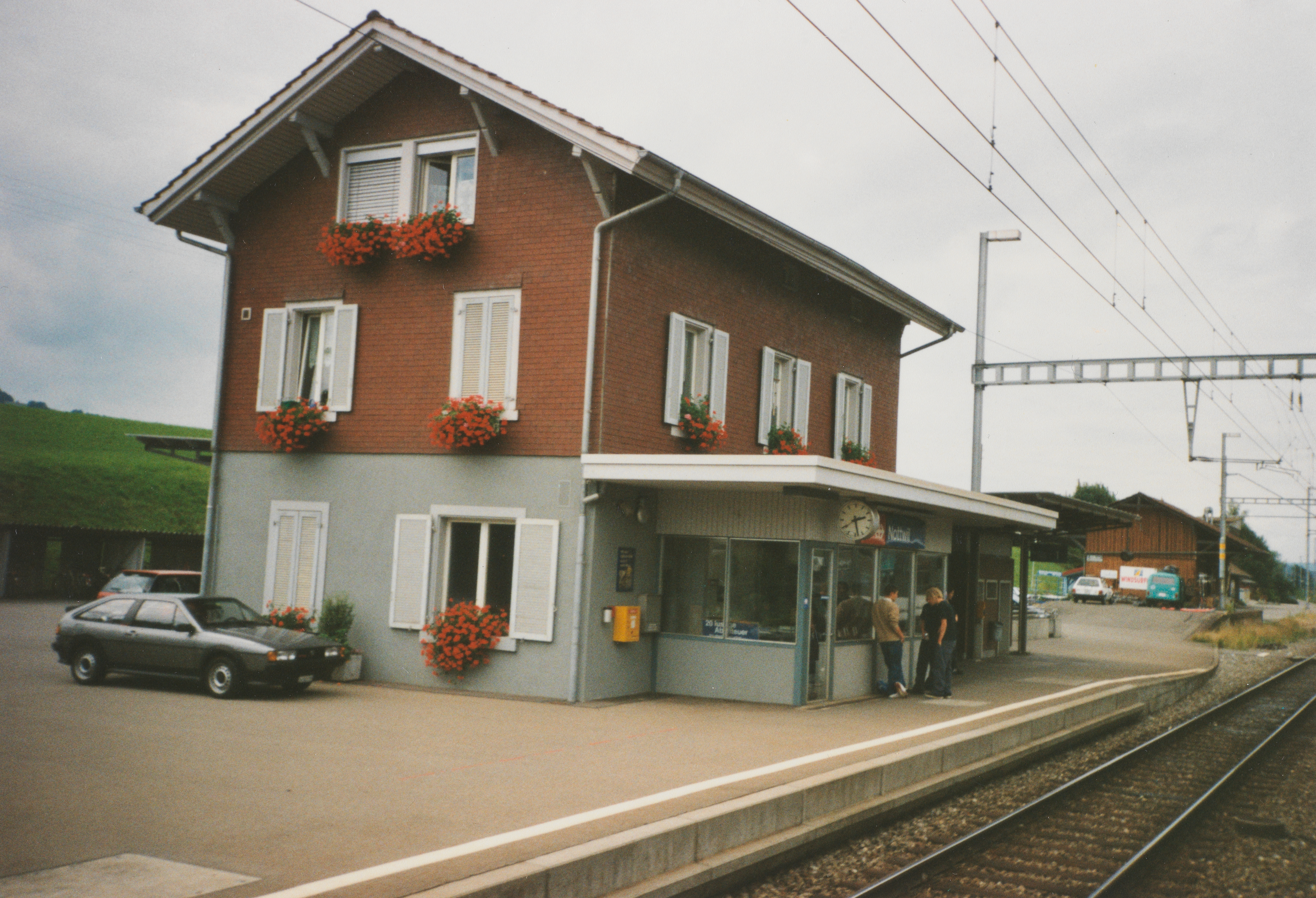
station building, 1999

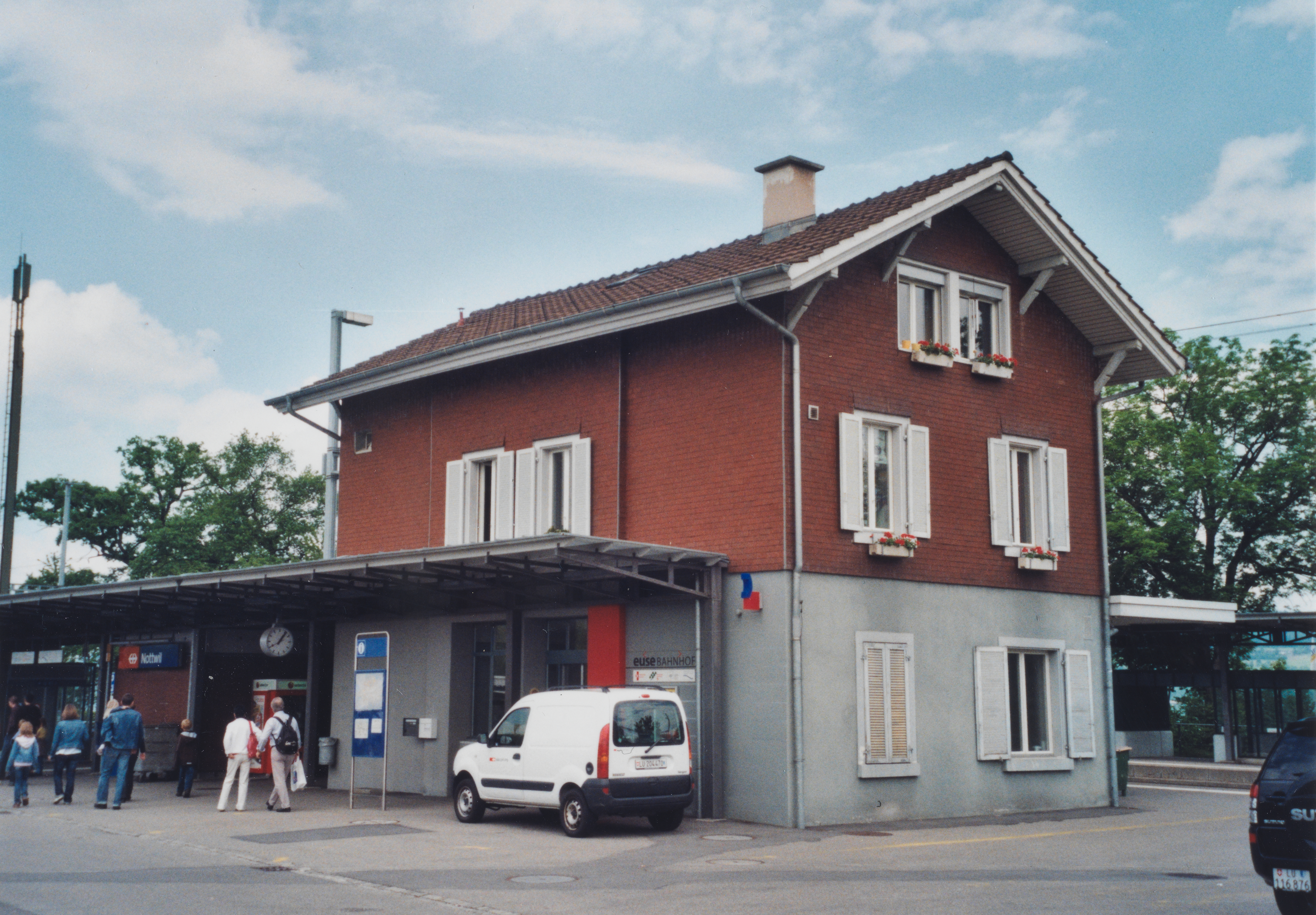
station building, 2010
