= Brittnau-Wikon railway station =

Railway station in Switzerland

Brittnau-Wikon
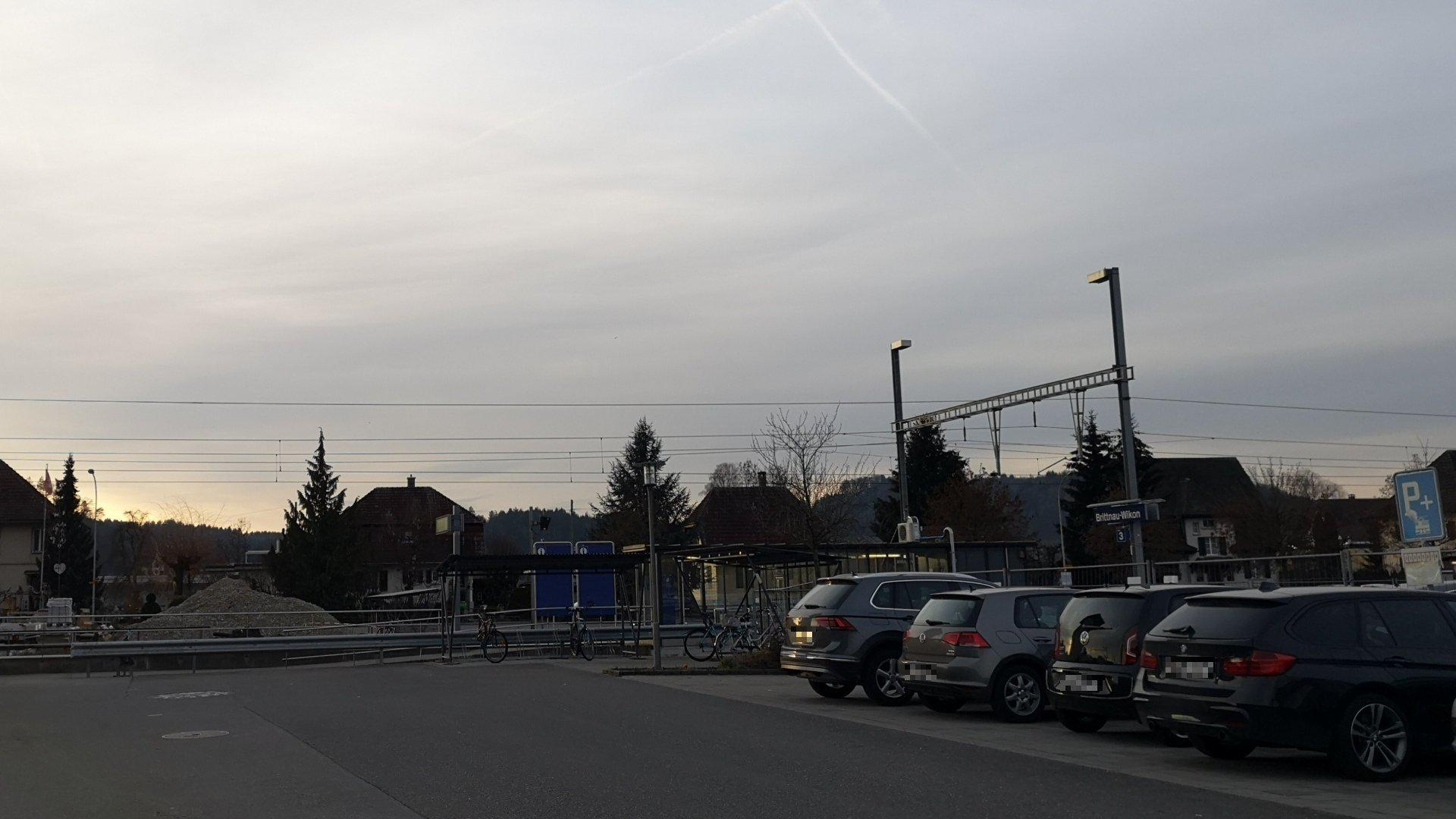
- The station in 2018

General information
- Location: Wikon; Switzerland
- Coordinates: 47°16′N 7°58′E
- Owner: Swiss Federal Railways
- Line: Olten–Lucerne line
- Distance: 50.5 km (31.4 mi) from Basel SBB
- Train operators: Swiss Federal Railways
- Connections: Aargau Verkehr buses

Passengers
- 2018: 220 per weekday

Services
Preceding station	Aargau S-Bahn	Following station
Zofingen towards Turgi	S29	Reiden towards Sursee
Location
- Location within Switzerland Location within Canton of Lucerne

Brittnau-Wikon railway station (German: Bahnhof Brittnau-Wikon) is a railway station in the municipality of Wikon, in the Swiss canton of Lucerne. It is an intermediate stop on the standard gauge Olten–Lucerne line of Swiss Federal Railways.

== Services ==
The following services stop at Brittnau-Wikon:

- Aargau S-Bahn S29: hourly service between Sursee and Turgi.
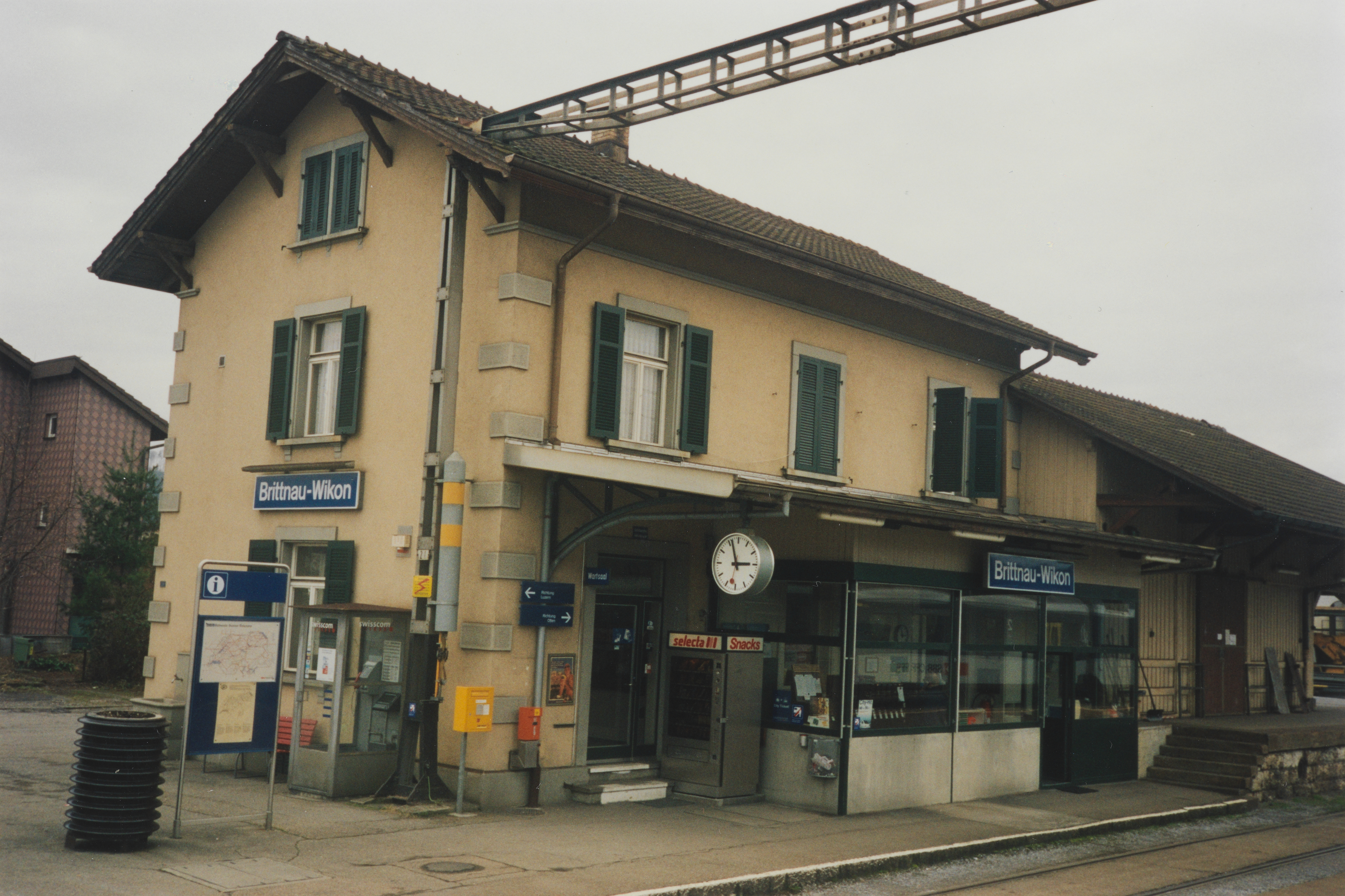
Old station building in 2000
