= Reiden railway station =

Railway station in Switzerland

Reiden
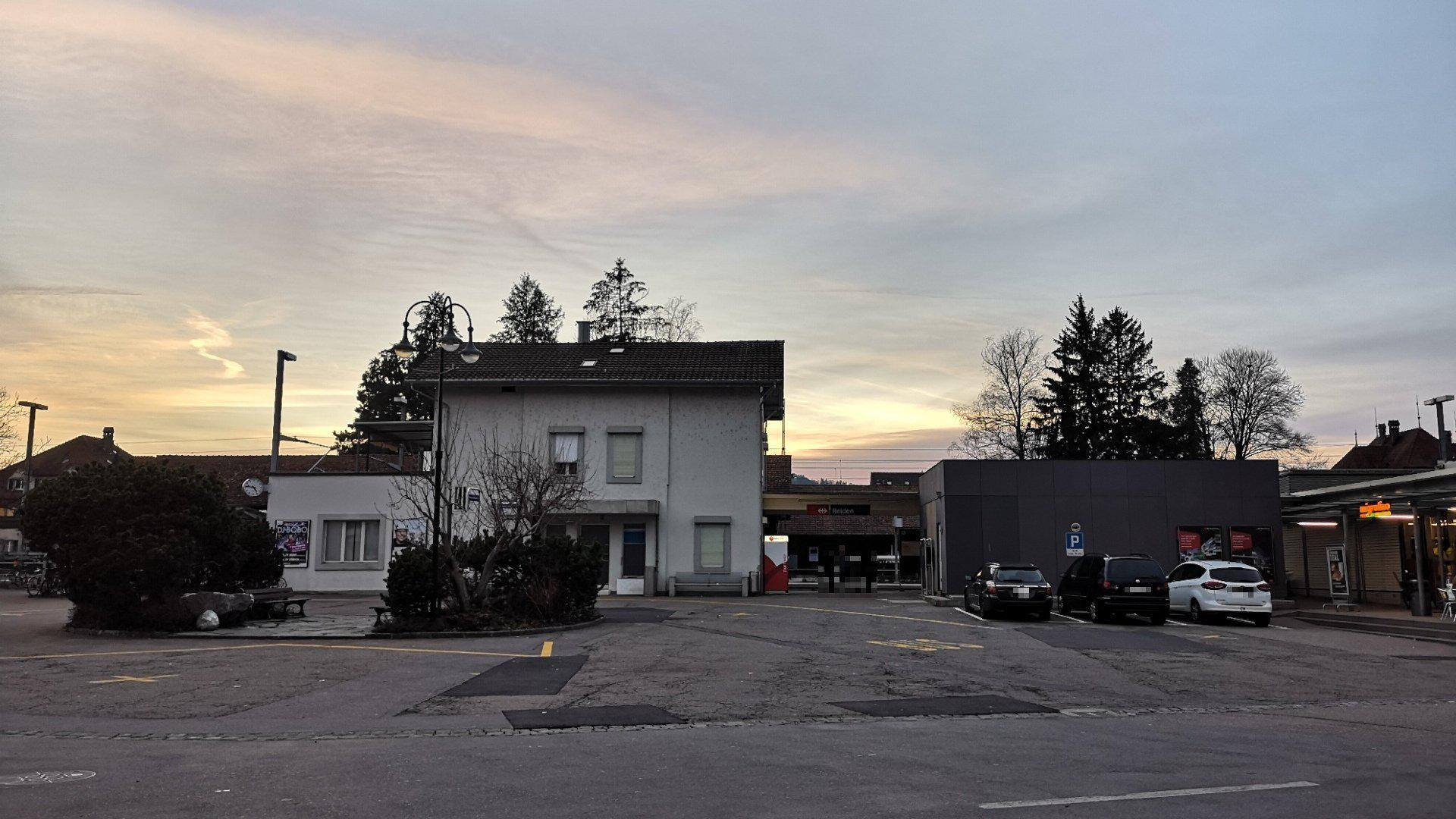
- The station building in 2018

General information
- Location: Reiden; Switzerland
- Coordinates: 47°14′28″N 7°58′08″E
- Owner: Swiss Federal Railways
- Line: Olten–Lucerne line
- Distance: 53.0 km (32.9 mi) from Basel SBB
- Train operators: Swiss Federal Railways
- Connections: Aargau Verkehr buses

Passengers
- 2018: 1800 per weekday

Services
Preceding station	SBB CFF FFS	Following station
Zofingen towards Olten	RE24	Dagmersellen towards Lucerne
Preceding station	Aargau S-Bahn	Following station
Brittnau-Wikon towards Turgi	S29	Dagmersellen towards Sursee
Location
- Location within Switzerland Location within Canton of Lucerne

Reiden railway station (German: Bahnhof Reiden) is a railway station in the municipality of Reiden, in the Swiss canton of Lucerne. It is an intermediate stop on the standard gauge Olten–Lucerne line of Swiss Federal Railways.

== Services ==
The following services stop at Reiden:

- RegioExpress: hourly service between Olten and Lucerne.
- Aargau S-Bahn S29: hourly service between Sursee and Turgi.

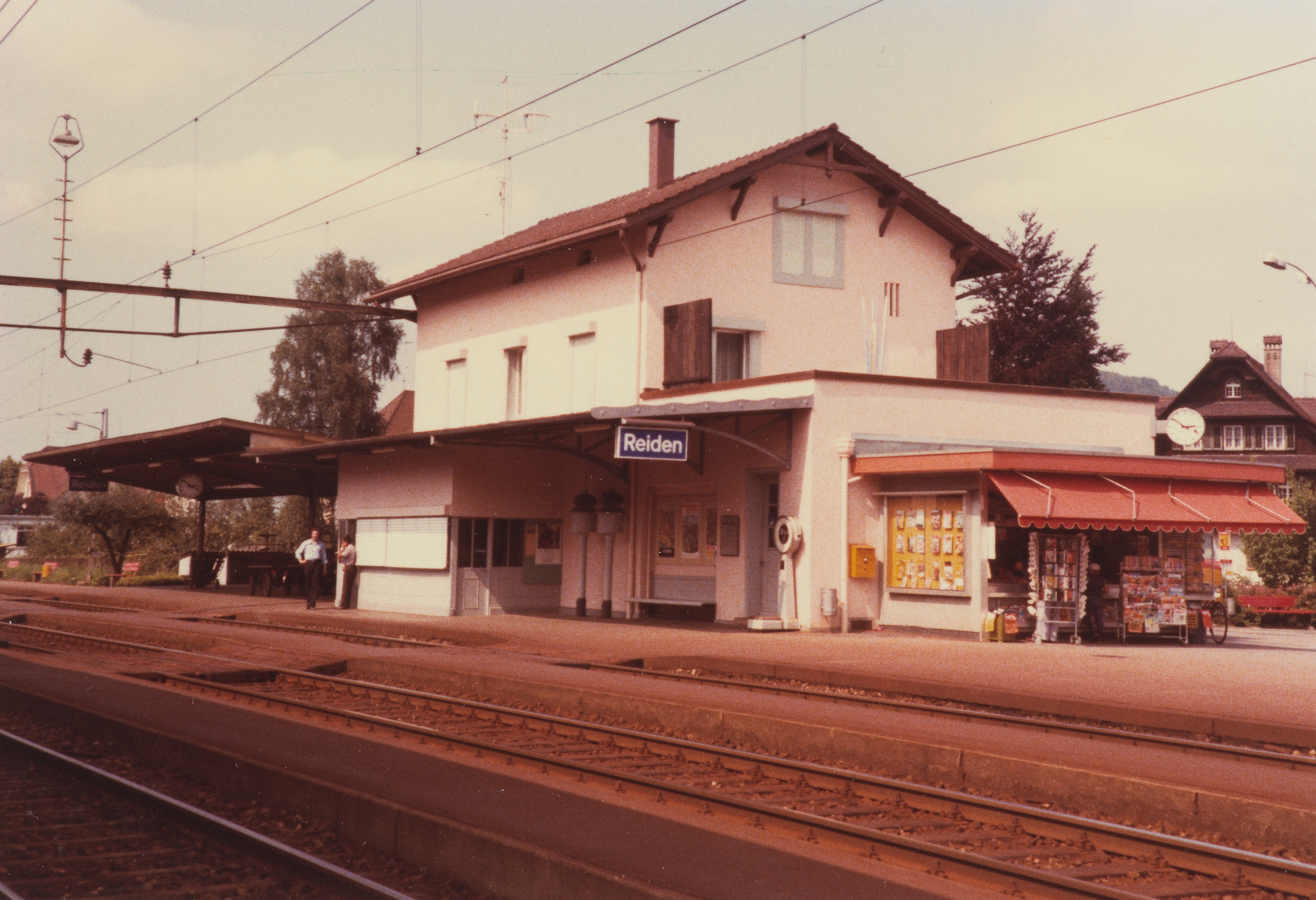
station building, 1978

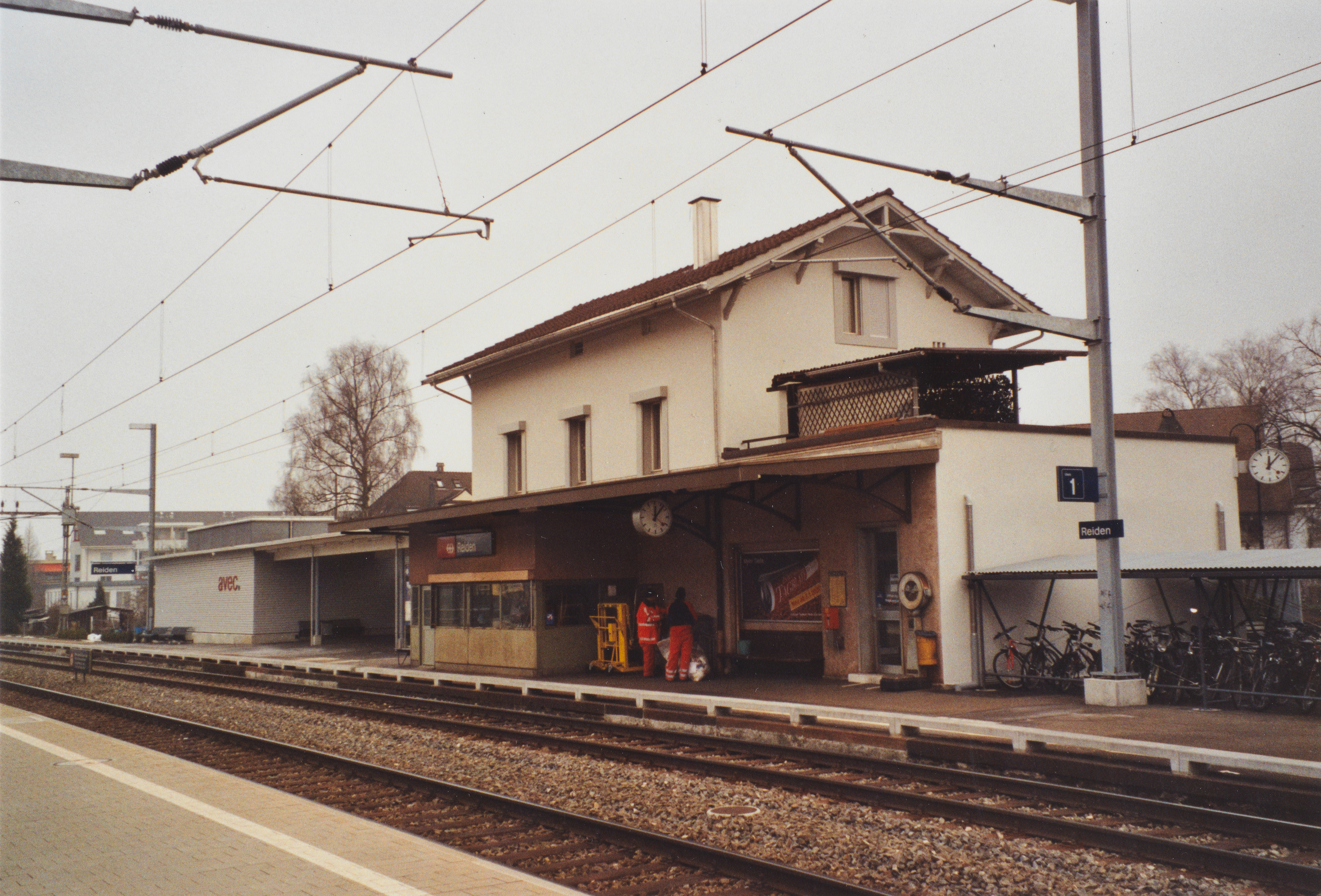
station building, 2002
