= Nebikon railway station =

Railway station in Switzerland

Nebikon
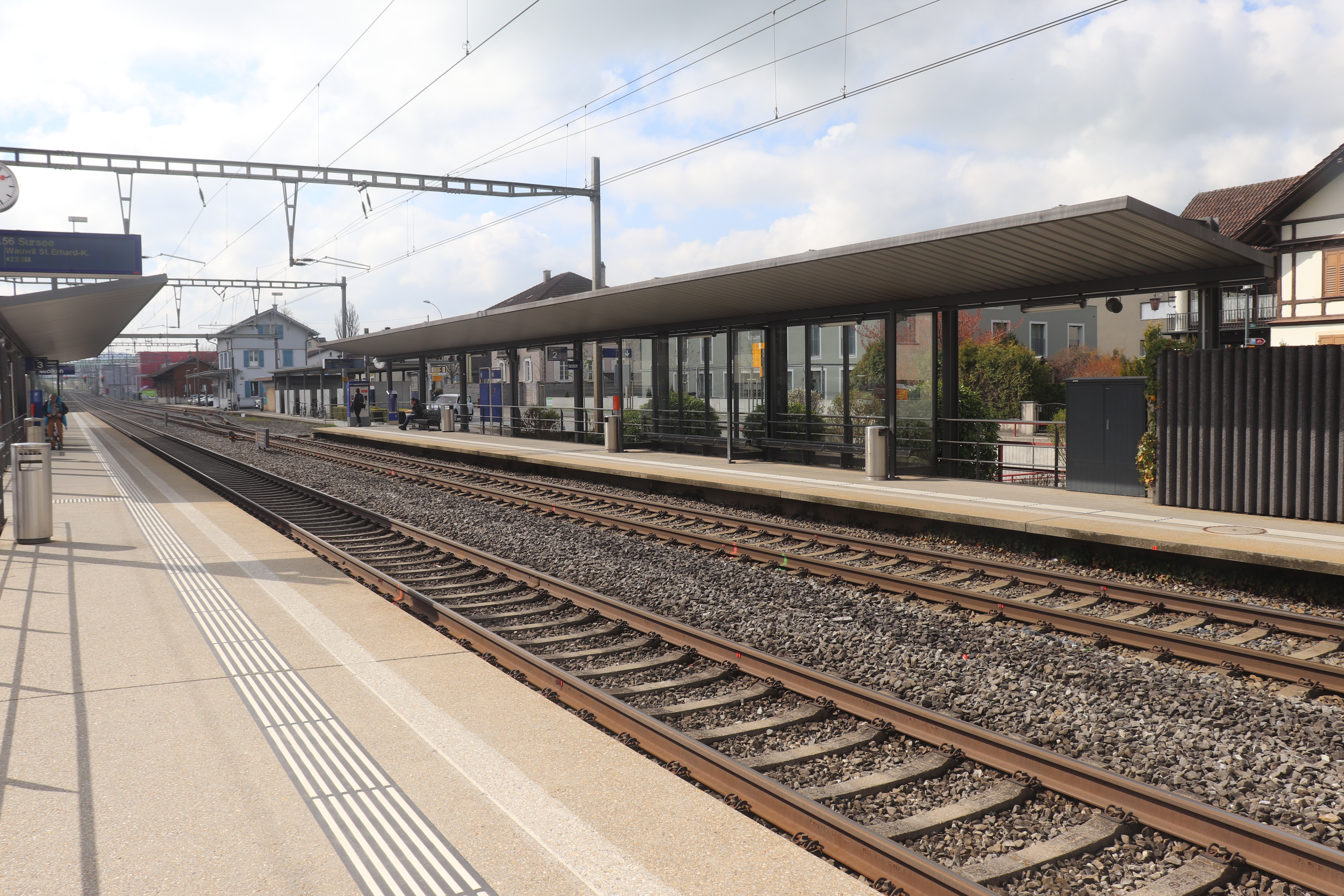
- The station platforms in 2019

General information
- Location: Nebikon; Switzerland
- Coordinates: 47°11′N 7°59′E
- Owner: Swiss Federal Railways
- Line: Olten–Lucerne line
- Distance: 58.7 km (36.5 mi) from Basel SBB
- Train operators: Swiss Federal Railways
- Connections: PostAuto Schweiz buses

Passengers
- 2018: 1600 per weekday

Services
Preceding station	SBB CFF FFS	Following station
Dagmersellen towards Olten	RE24	Wauwil towards Lucerne
Preceding station	Aargau S-Bahn	Following station
Dagmersellen towards Turgi	S29	Wauwil towards Sursee
Location
- Location within Switzerland Location within Canton of Lucerne

Nebikon railway station (German: Bahnhof Nebikon) is a railway station in the municipality of Nebikon, in the Swiss canton of Lucerne. It is an intermediate stop on the standard gauge Olten–Lucerne line of Swiss Federal Railways.

== Services ==
The following services stop at Nebikon:

- RegioExpress: hourly service between Olten and Lucerne.
- Aargau S-Bahn S29: hourly service between Sursee and Turgi.
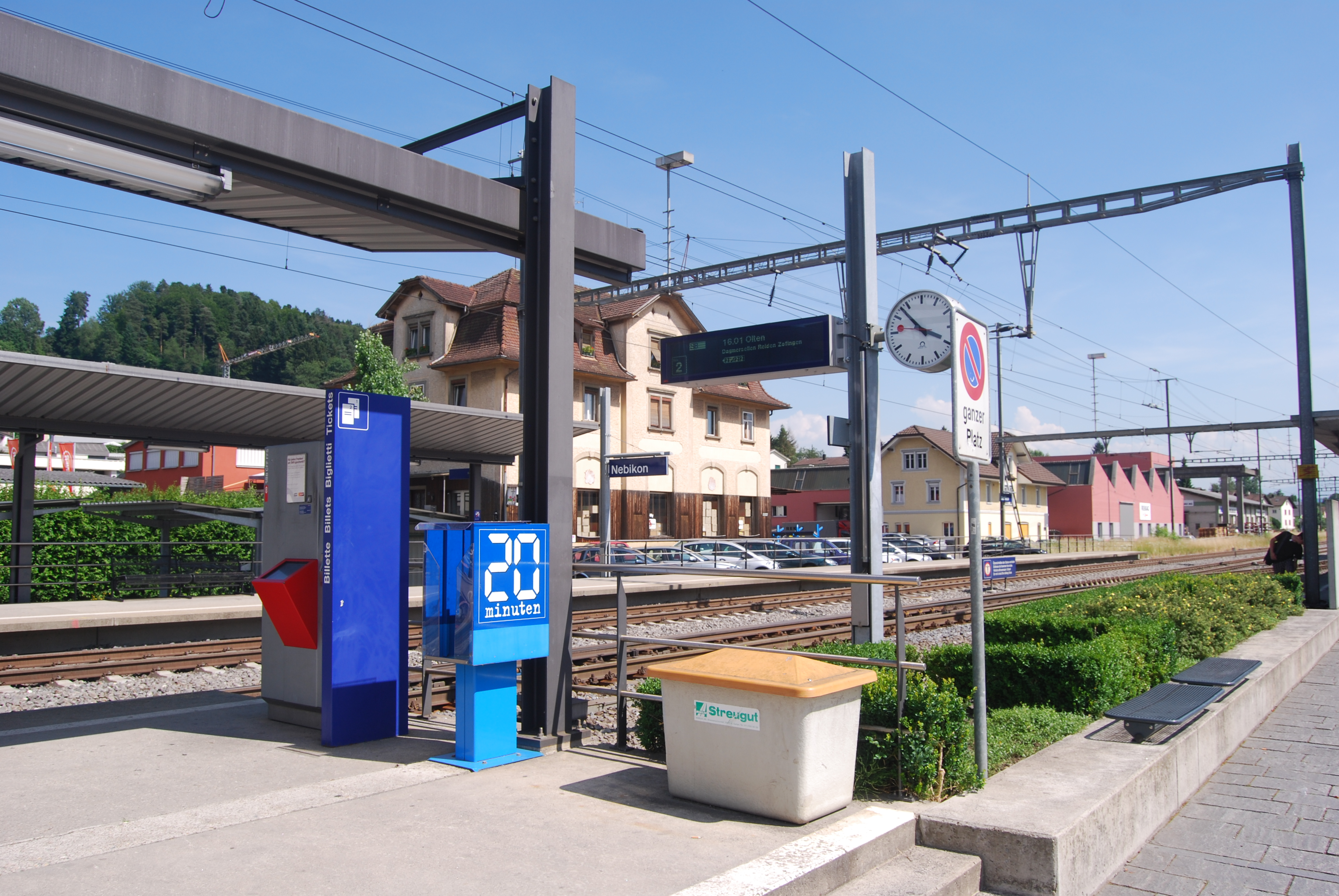
platform in 2010

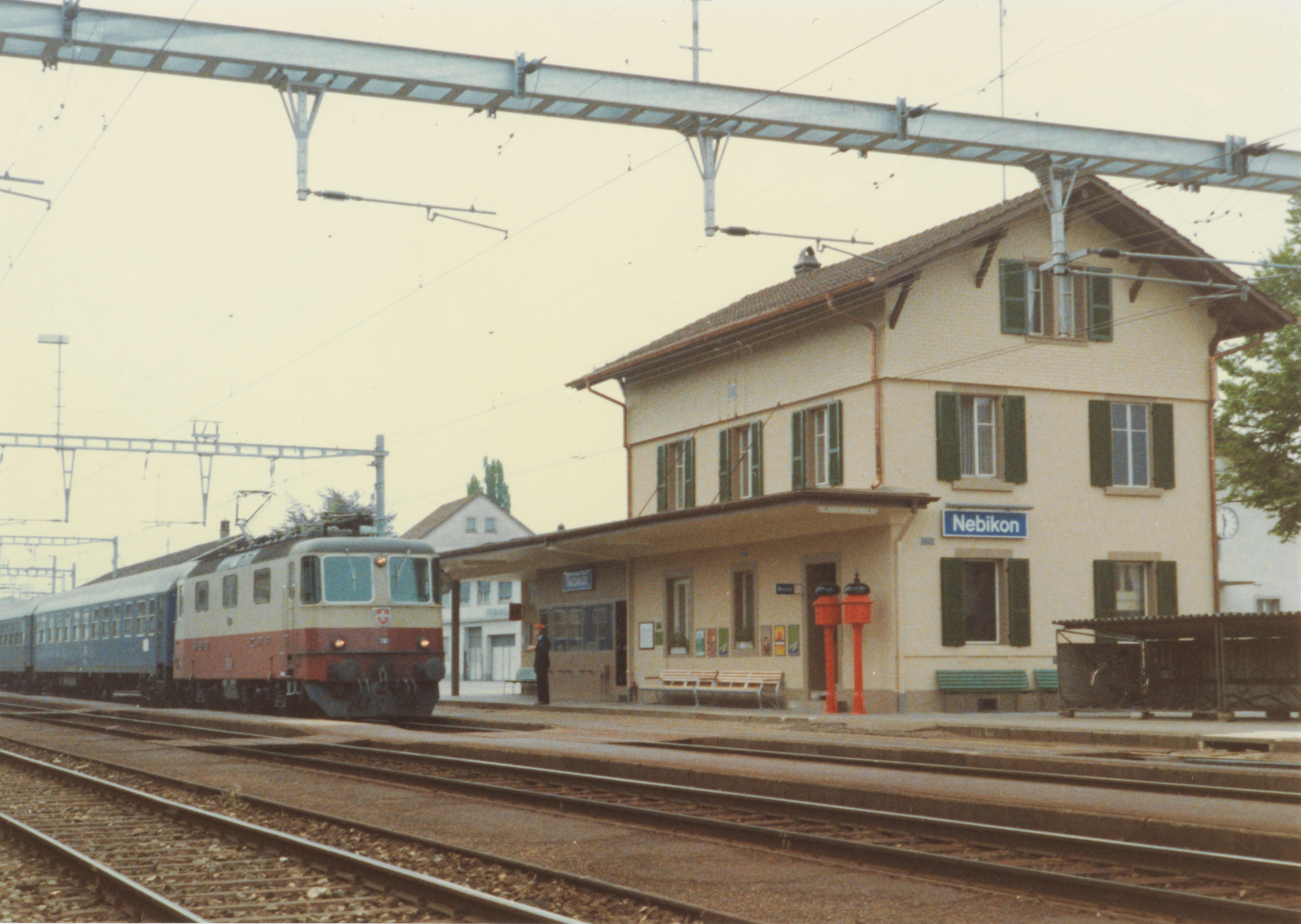
station building, 1979

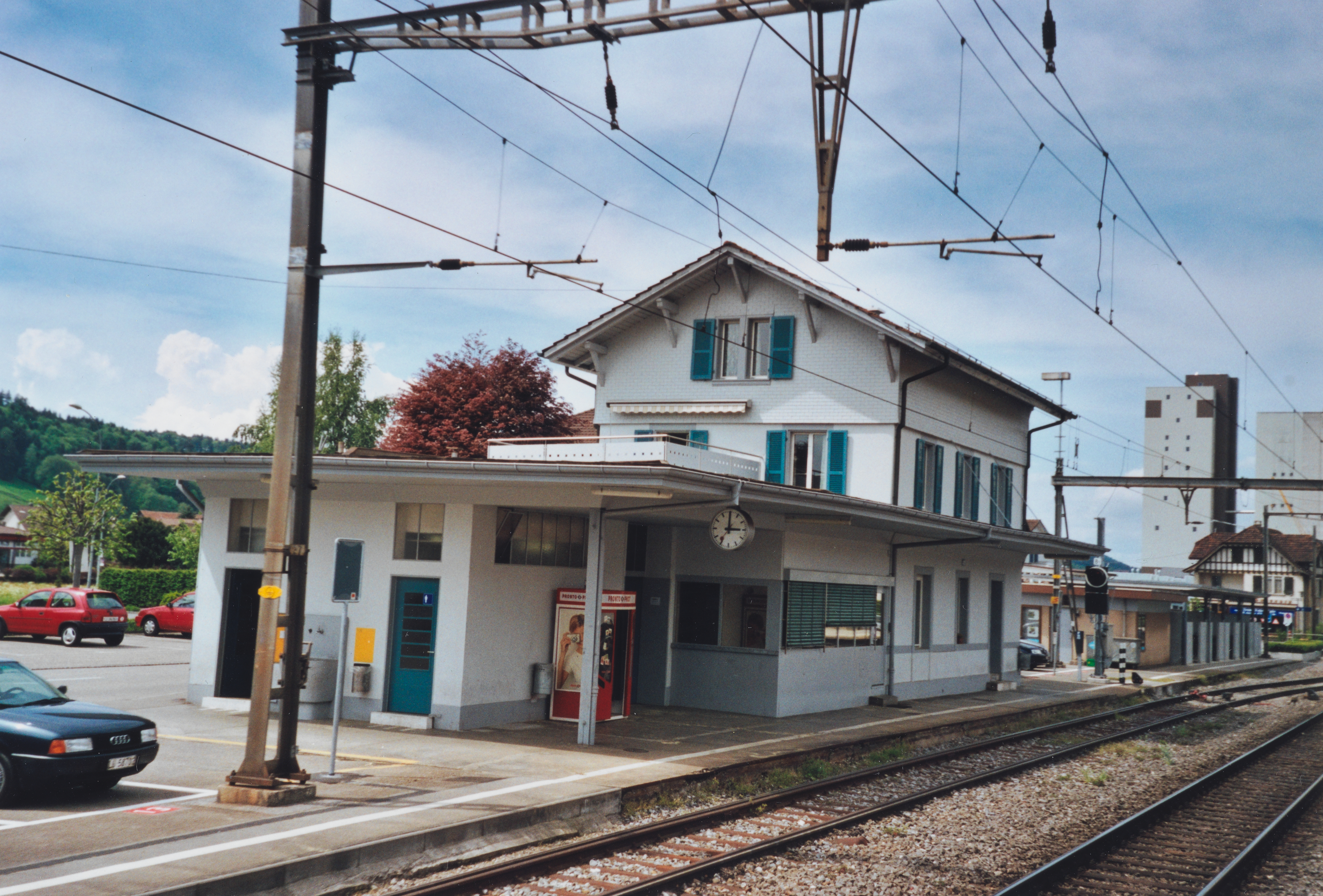
former station building, 2006
