= Dagmersellen railway station =

Railway station in Switzerland

Dagmersellen
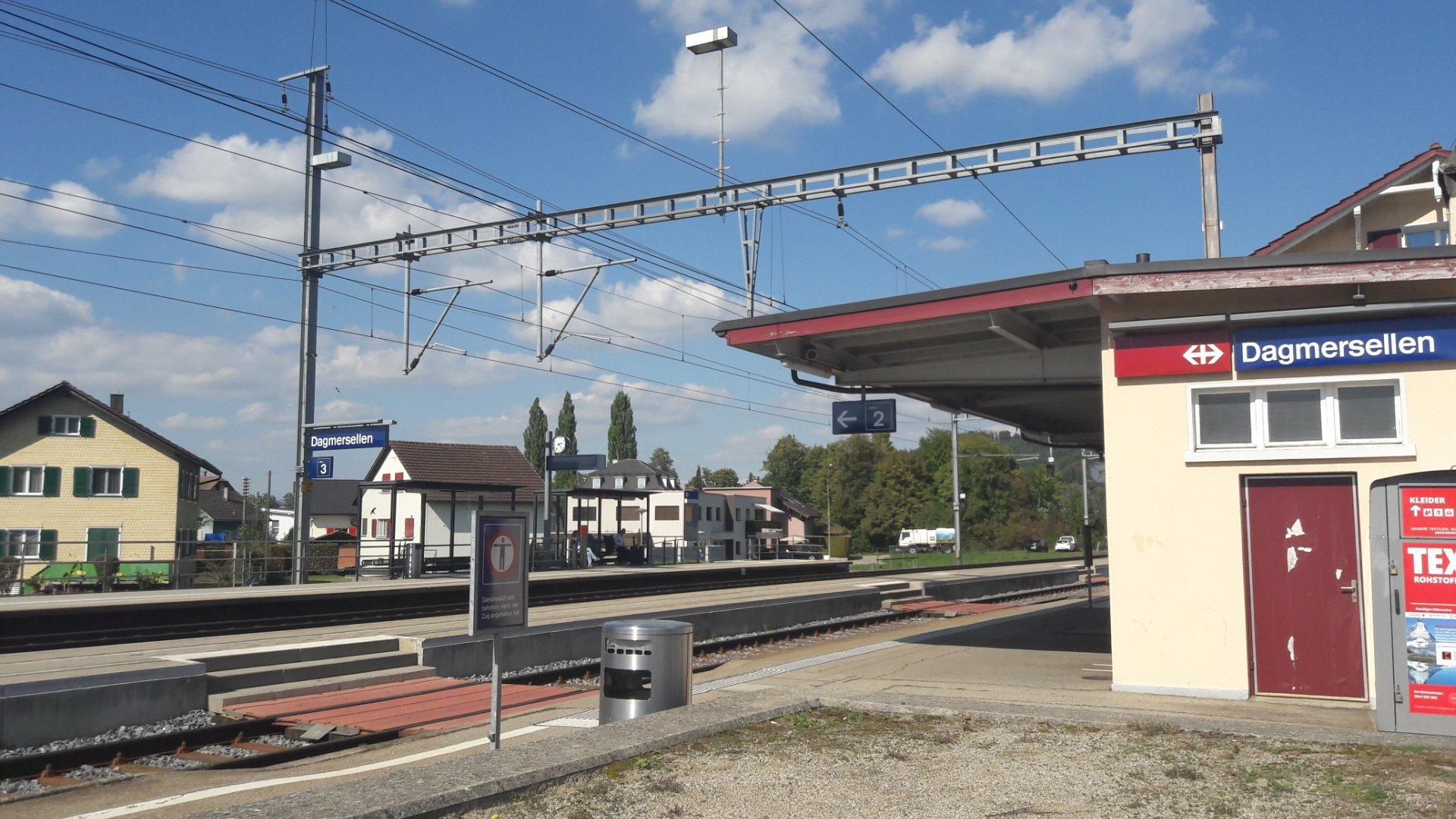
- The station in 2018

General information
- Location: Dagmersellen; Switzerland
- Coordinates: 47°13′N 7°59′E
- Owner: Swiss Federal Railways
- Line: Olten–Lucerne line
- Distance: 55.8 km (34.7 mi) from Basel SBB
- Train operators: Swiss Federal Railways
- Connections: PostAuto Schweiz buses

Passengers
- 2018: 1200 per weekday

Services
Preceding station	SBB CFF FFS	Following station
Reiden towards Olten	RE24	Nebikon towards Lucerne
Preceding station	Aargau S-Bahn	Following station
Reiden towards Turgi	S29	Nebikon towards Sursee
Location
- Location within Switzerland Location within Canton of Lucerne

Dagmersellen railway station (German: Bahnhof Dagmersellen) is a railway station in the municipality of Dagmersellen, in the Swiss canton of Lucerne. It is an intermediate stop on the standard gauge Olten–Lucerne line of Swiss Federal Railways.

== Services ==
The following services stop at Dagmersellen:

- RegioExpress: hourly service between Olten and Lucerne.
- Aargau S-Bahn S29: hourly service between Sursee and Turgi.

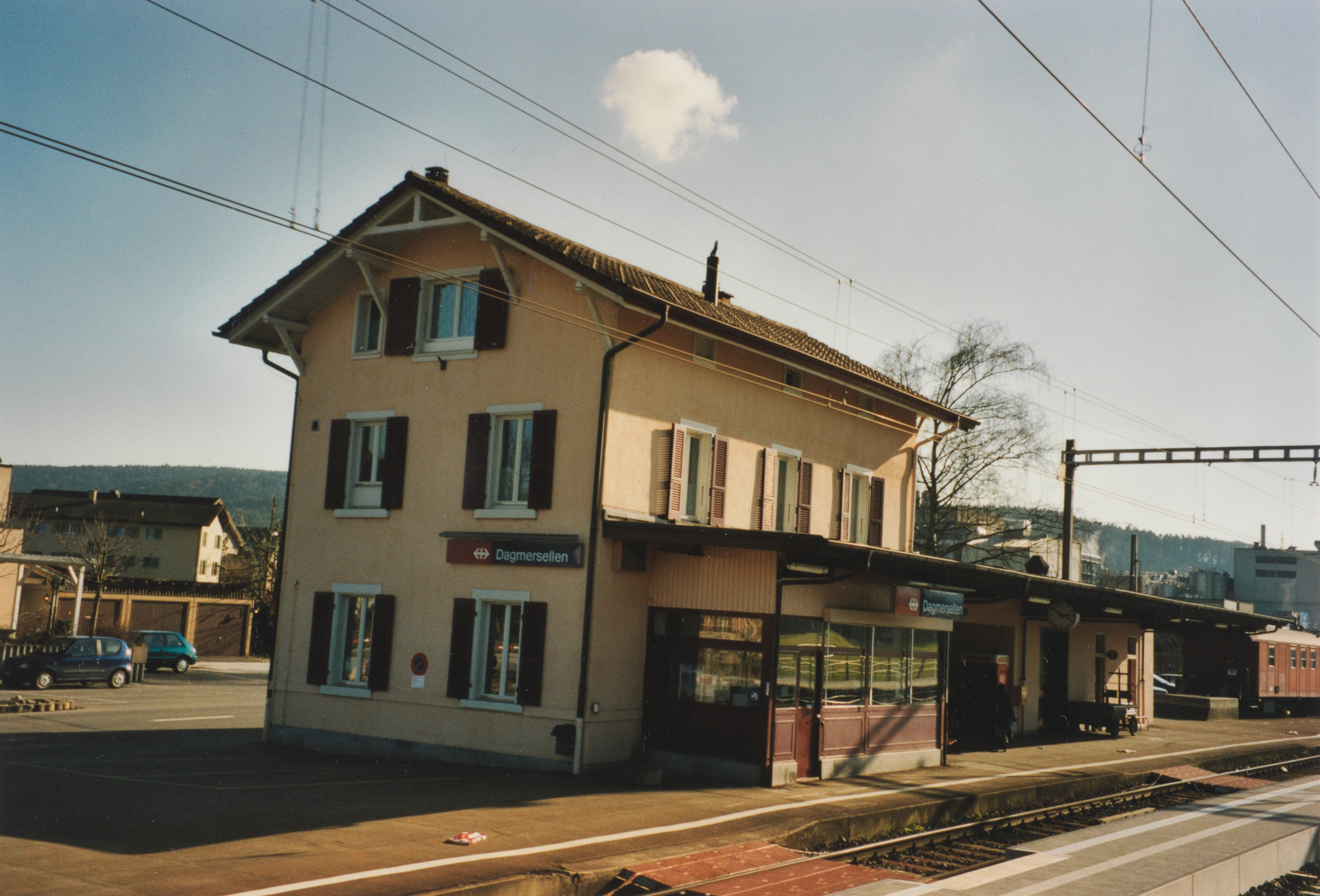
station building in 2001
