= Holderbank railway station =

Railway station in Switzerland

Holderbank
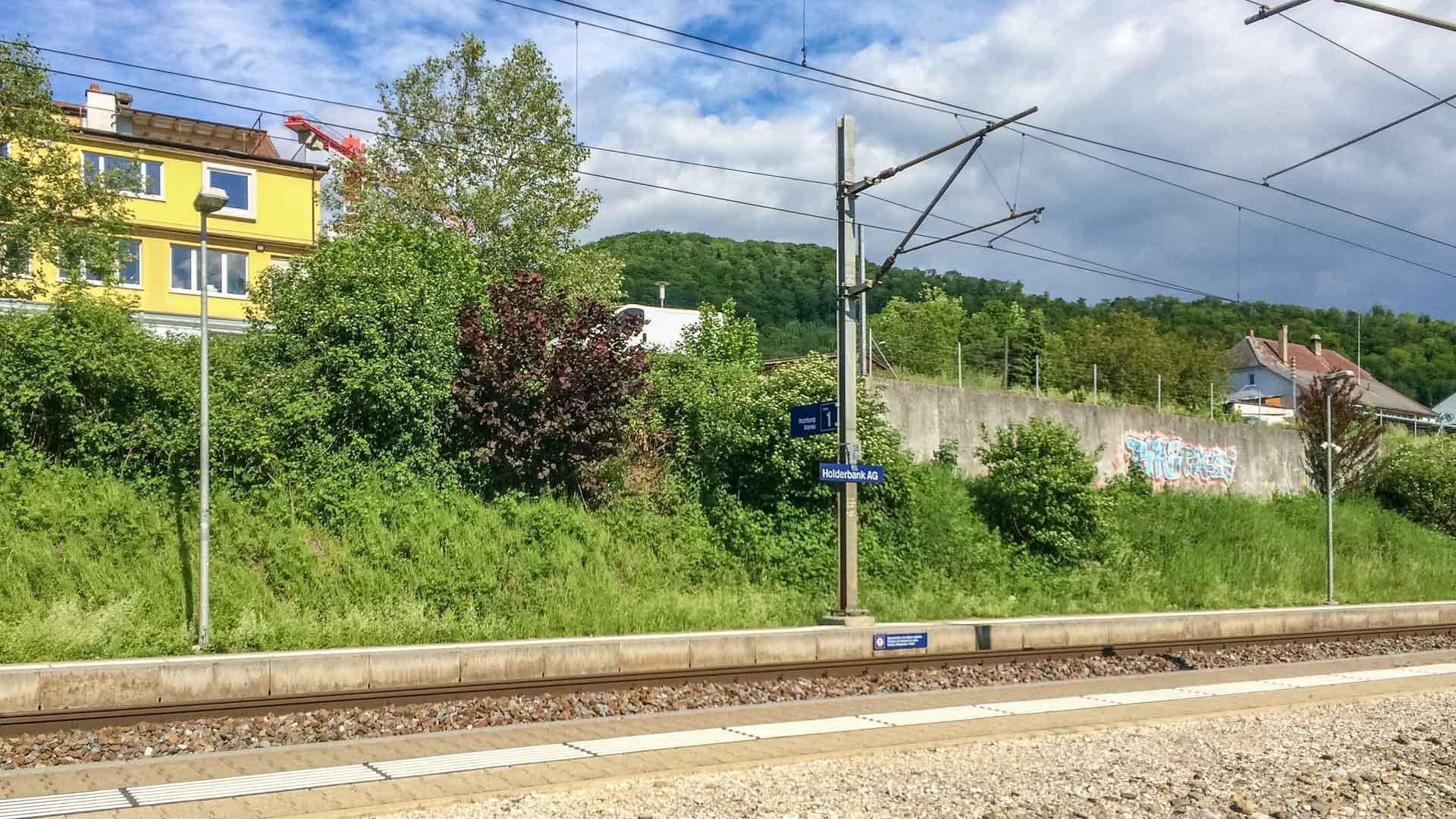
- The station platforms in 2017

General information
- Location: Holderbank; Switzerland
- Coordinates: 47°25′43″N 8°10′00″E
- Owner: Swiss Federal Railways
- Line: Baden–Aarau line
- Train operators: Swiss Federal Railways

Services
Preceding station	Aargau S-Bahn	Following station
Wildegg towards Sursee	S29	Schinznach Bad towards Turgi
Location
- Location within Switzerland Location within Canton of Aargau

Holderbank railway station (German: Bahnhof Holderbank) is a railway station in the municipality of Holderbank, in the Swiss canton of Aargau. It is an intermediate stop on the Baden–Aarau line.

== Services ==
The following services stop at Holderbank:

- Aargau S-Bahn: S29: half-hourly service between Aarau and Turgi, with every other train continuing from Aarau to Sursee.
