= Schinznach Bad railway station =

Railway station in Switzerland

Schinznach Bad
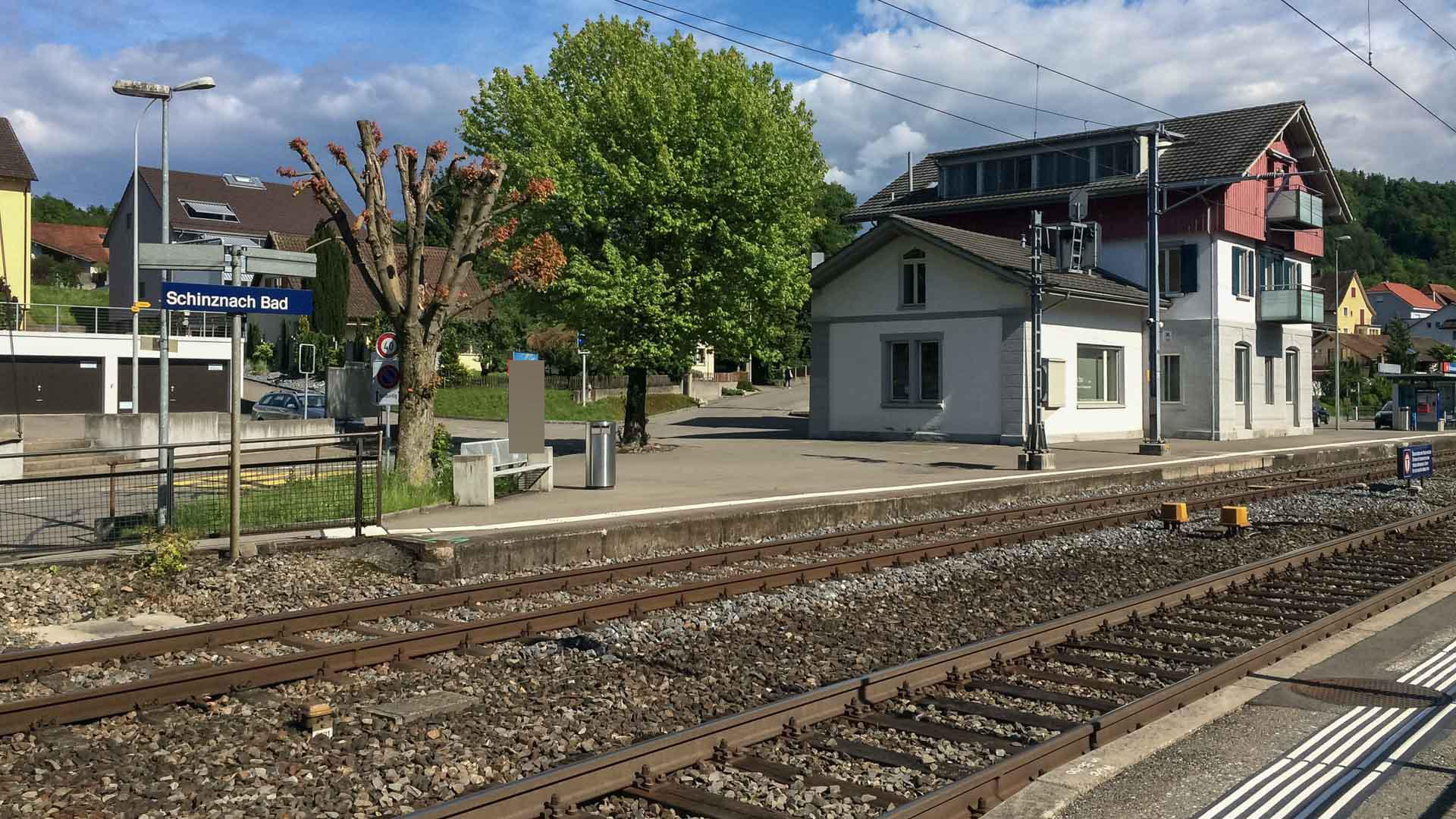
- The station in 2018

General information
- Location: Schinznach-Bad; Switzerland
- Coordinates: 47°27′N 8°10′E
- Owner: Swiss Federal Railways
- Line: Baden–Aarau line
- Train operators: Swiss Federal Railways

Passengers
- 2018: 570 per weekday

Services
Preceding station	Aargau S-Bahn	Following station
Holderbank towards Sursee	S29	Brugg AG towards Turgi
Location
- Location within Switzerland Location within Canton of Aargau

Schinznach Bad railway station (German: Bahnhof Schinznach Bad) is a railway station in the municipality of Schinznach-Bad, in the Swiss canton of Aargau. It is an intermediate stop on the standard gauge Baden–Aarau line of Swiss Federal Railways.

== Services ==
The following services stop at Schinznach Bad:

- Aargau S-Bahn S29: half-hourly service between Aarau and Turgi, with every other train continuing from Aarau to Sursee.
