= Sempach-Neuenkirch railway station =

Swiss railway station

Sempach-Neuenkirch
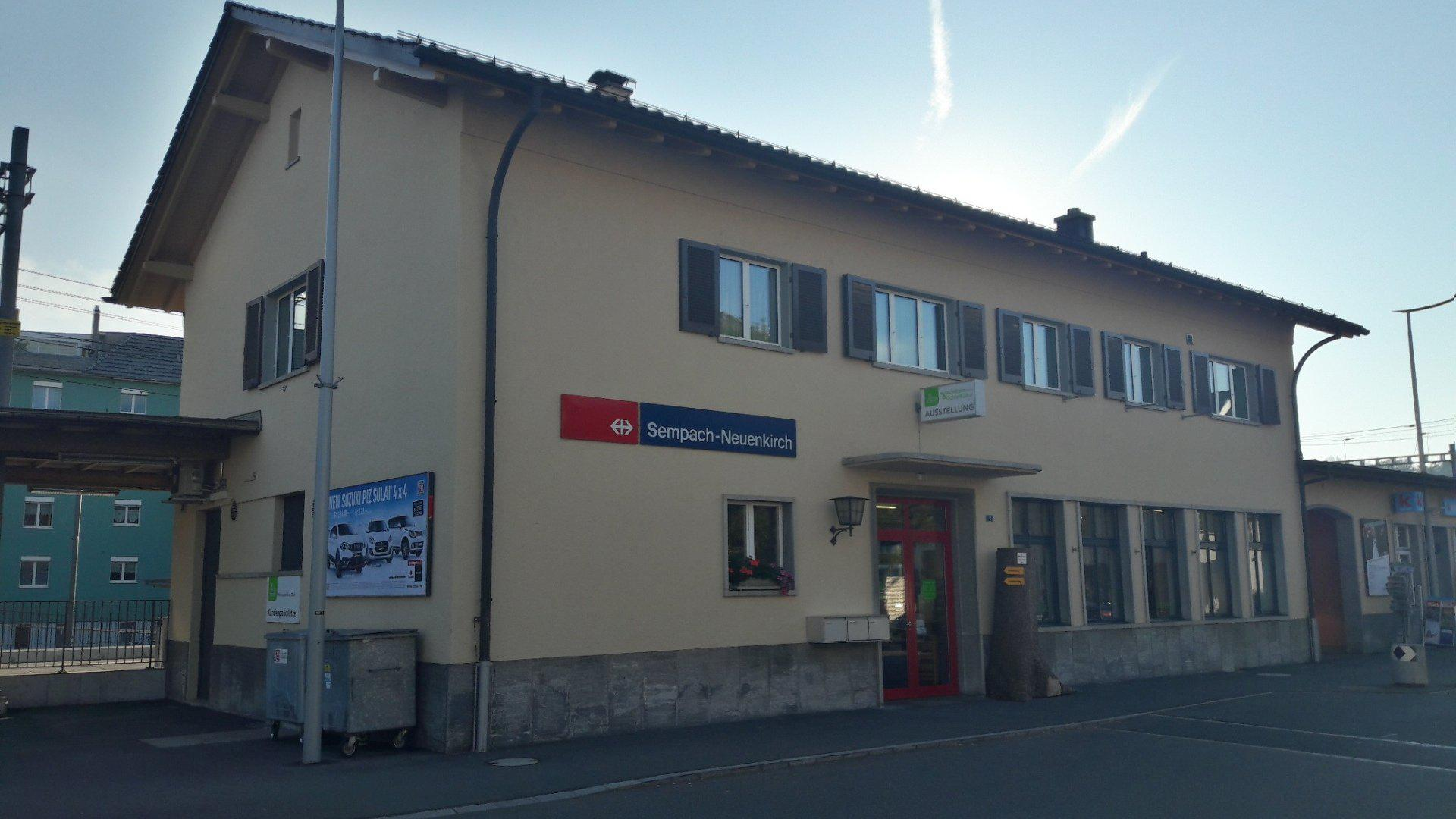
- The station building in 2018

General information
- Location: Neuenkirch; Switzerland
- Coordinates: 47°07′N 8°12′E
- Owner: Swiss Federal Railways
- Line: Olten–Lucerne line
- Train operators: Swiss Federal Railways

Services
Preceding station	SBB CFF FFS	Following station
Sursee towards Olten	RE24	Rothenburg Station towards Lucerne
Preceding station	Lucerne S-Bahn	Following station
Nottwil towards Sursee	S1	Rothenburg Station towards Baar
Location
- Location within Switzerland Location within Canton of Lucerne

Sempach-Neuenkirch railway station (German: Bahnhof Sempach-Neuenkirch) is a railway station in the municipality of Neuenkirch, in the Swiss canton of Lucerne. It is an intermediate stop on the standard gauge Olten–Lucerne line of Swiss Federal Railways.

== Services ==
The following services stop at Sempach-Neuenkirch:

- RegioExpress: hourly service between Lucerne and Olten.
- Lucerne S-Bahn S1: half-hourly service between Sursee and Baar.
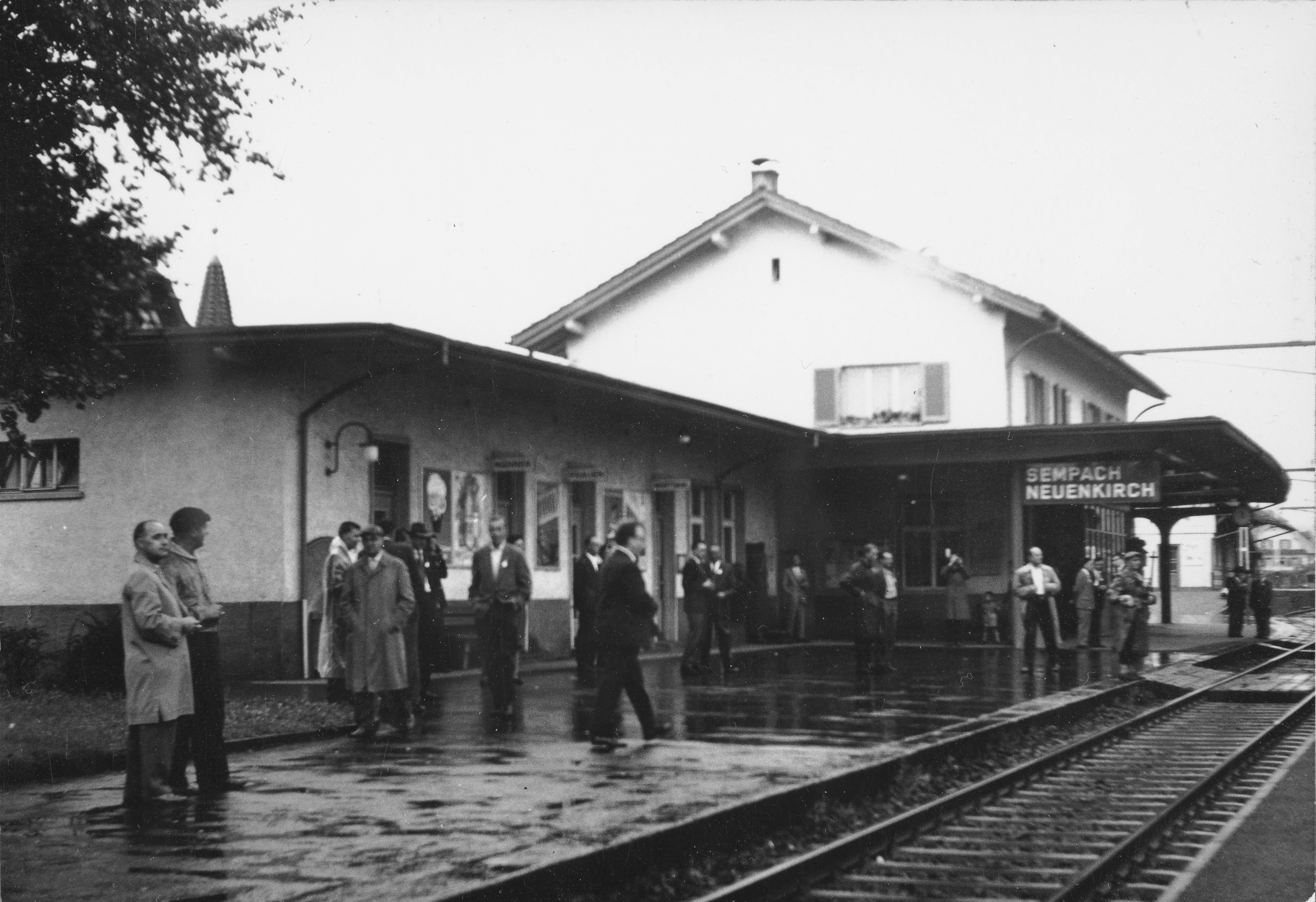
station building, 1960

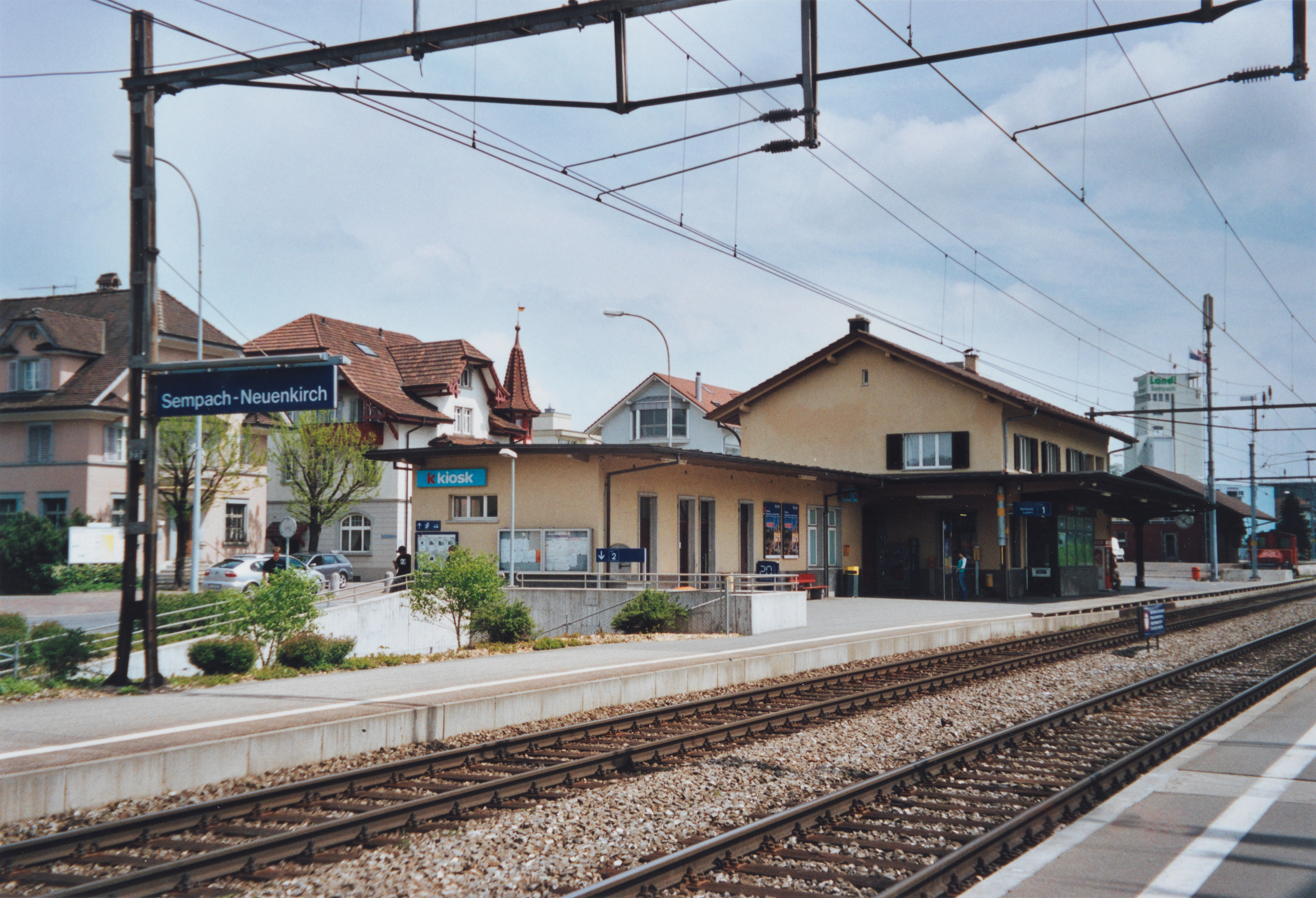
station building, 2006
