= Wildegg railway station =

Railway station in Switzerland

Wildegg
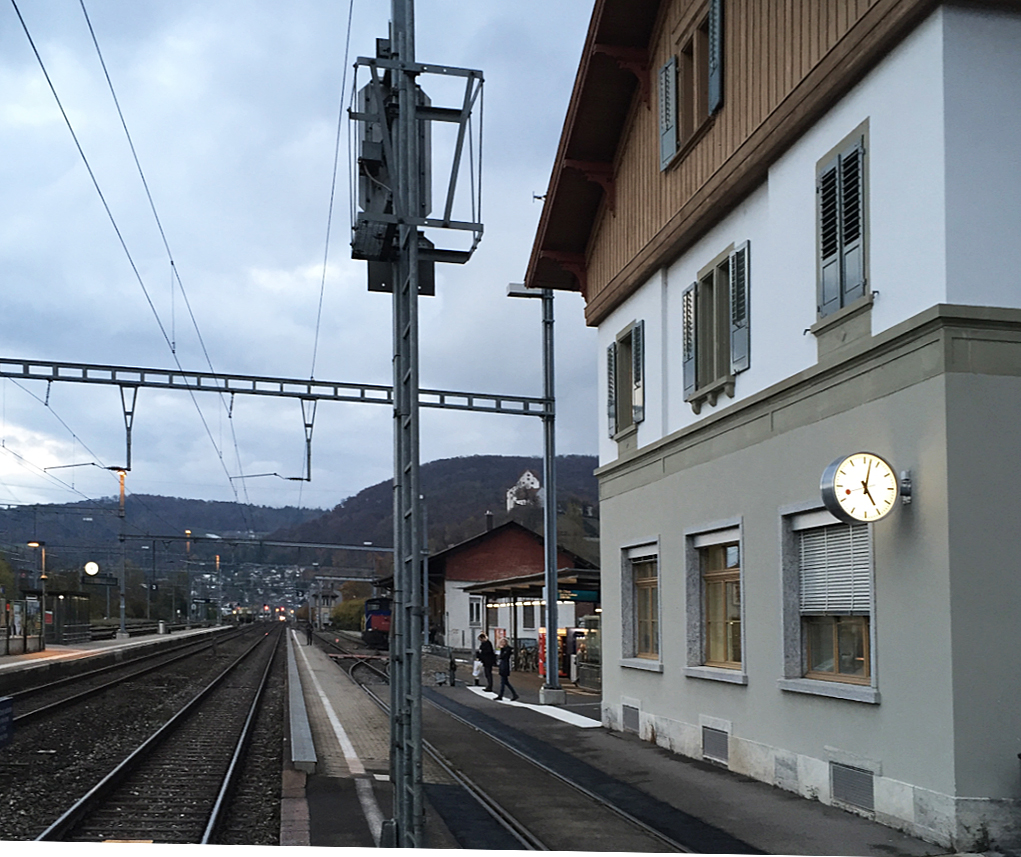
- The station in 2016

General information
- Location: Möriken-Wildegg; Switzerland
- Coordinates: 47°24′55″N 8°09′47″E
- Owner: Swiss Federal Railways
- Line: Baden–Aarau line
- Train operators: Swiss Federal Railways

Services
Preceding station	SBB CFF FFS	Following station
Aarau towards Olten	RE12	Brugg AG towards Wettingen
Preceding station	Aargau S-Bahn	Following station
Rupperswil towards Sursee	S29	Holderbank towards Turgi
Location
- Location within Switzerland Location within Canton of Aargau

Wildegg railway station (German: Bahnhof Wildegg) is a railway station in the municipality of Möriken-Wildegg, in the Swiss canton of Aargau. It is an intermediate stop on the Baden–Aarau line and is served by local and long-distance trains.

== Services ==
The following services stop at Wildegg:

- RegioExpress: hourly service between Olten and Wettingen.
- Aargau S-Bahn: S29: half-hourly service between Aarau and Turgi, with every other train continuing from Aarau to Sursee.

Until 1984, there was passenger service on the Seetal line to Lenzburg Stadt and Lenzburg railway stations.

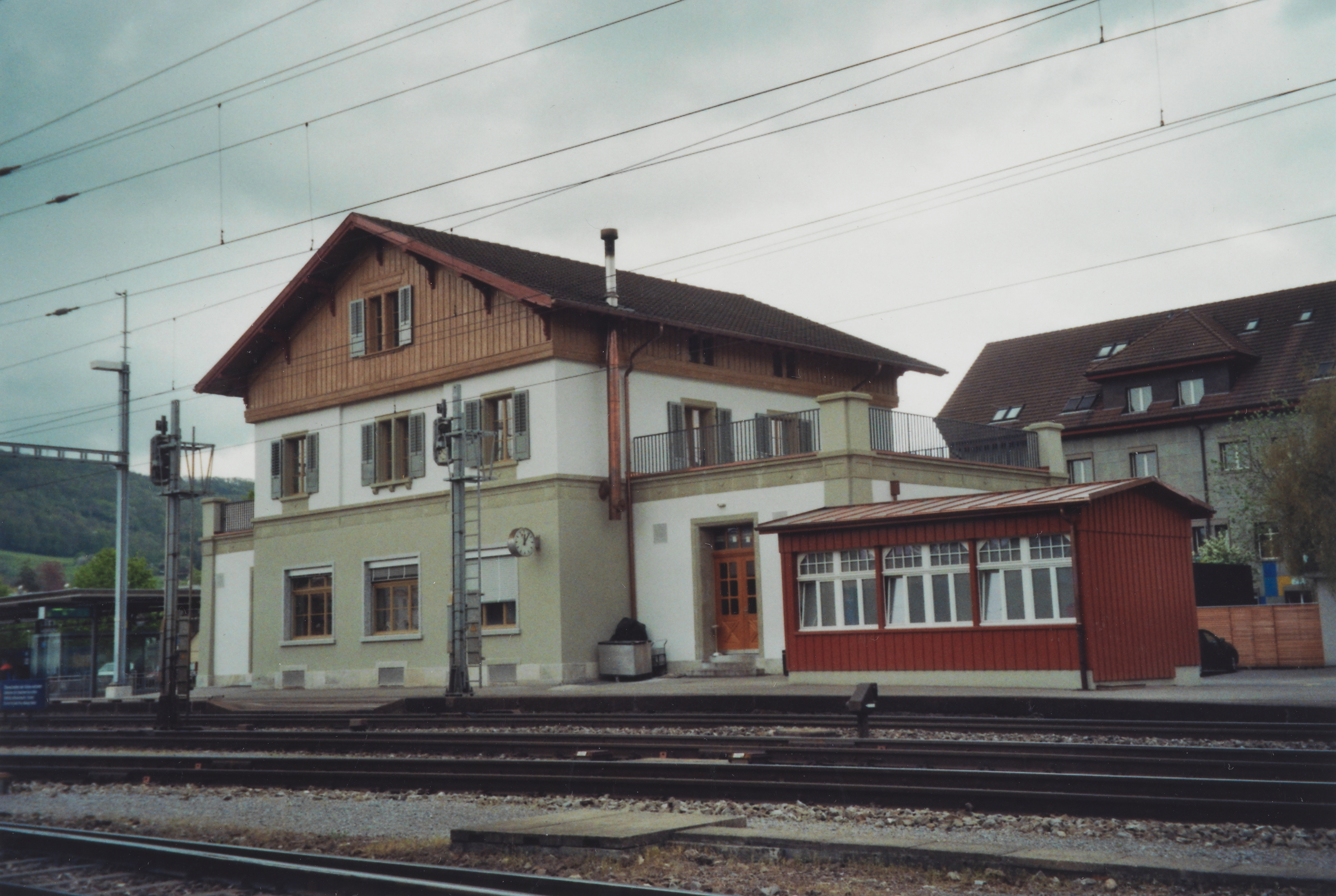
Station building and signal box in 2011

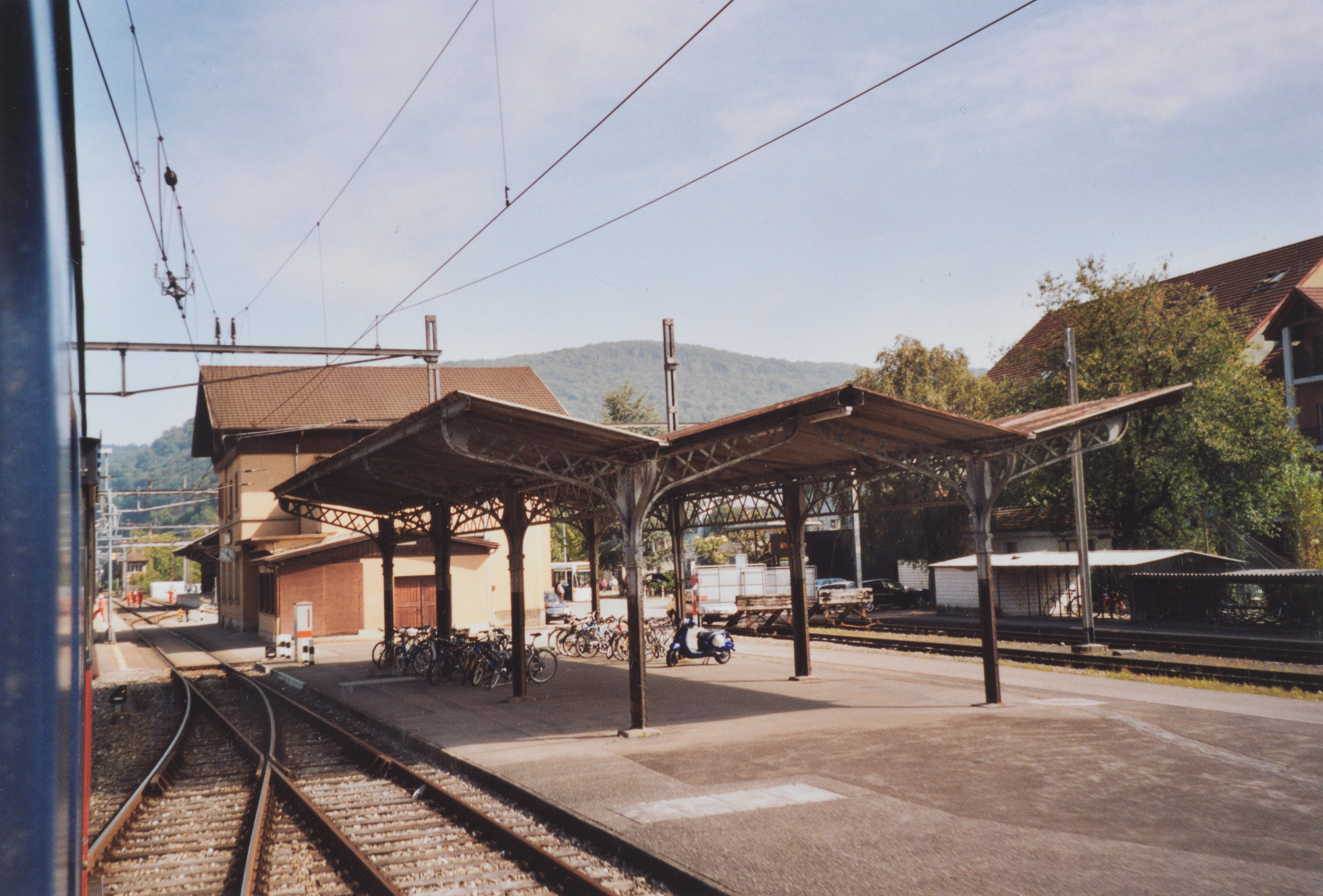
Platform roofs in 2005

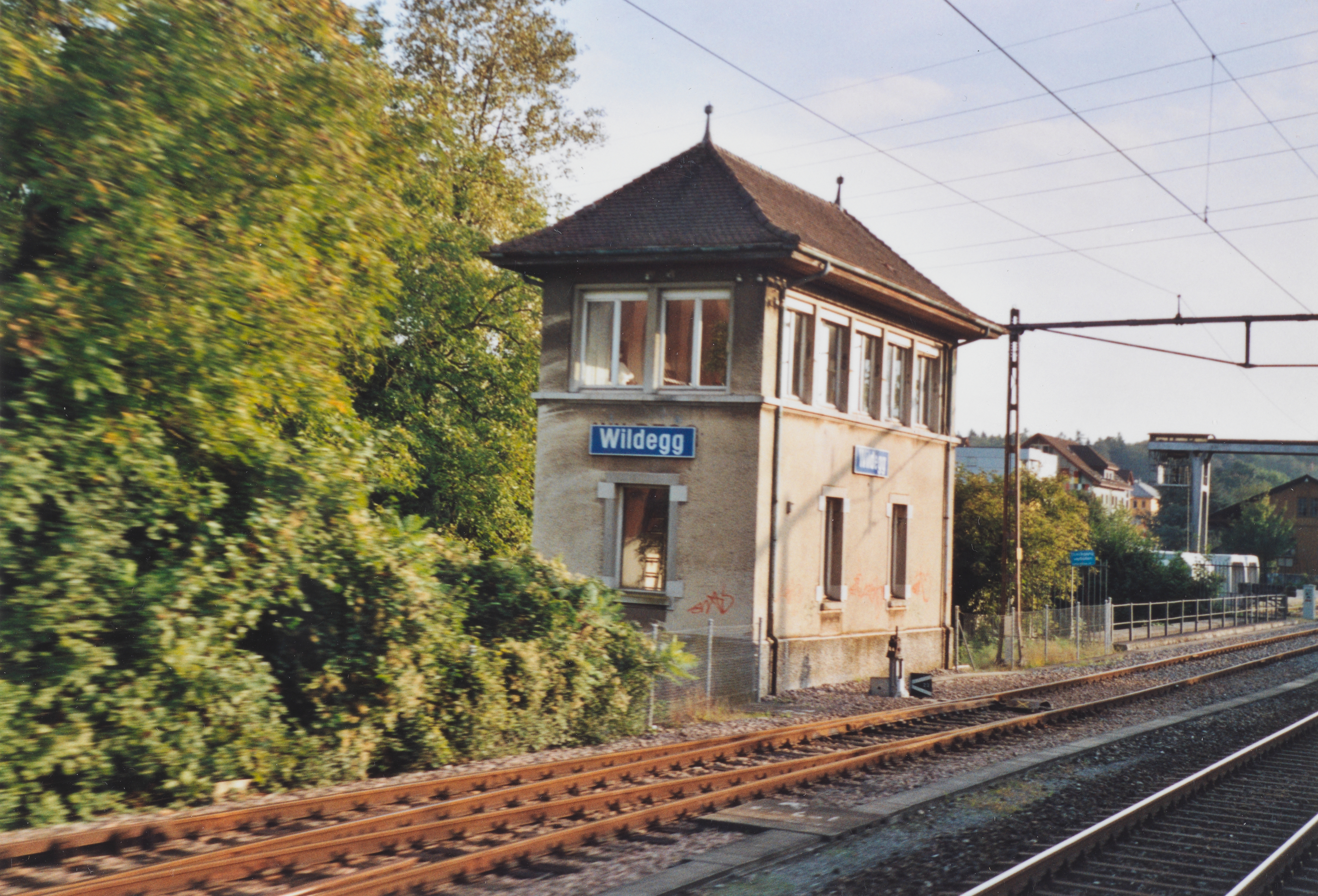
Signal box in 2011

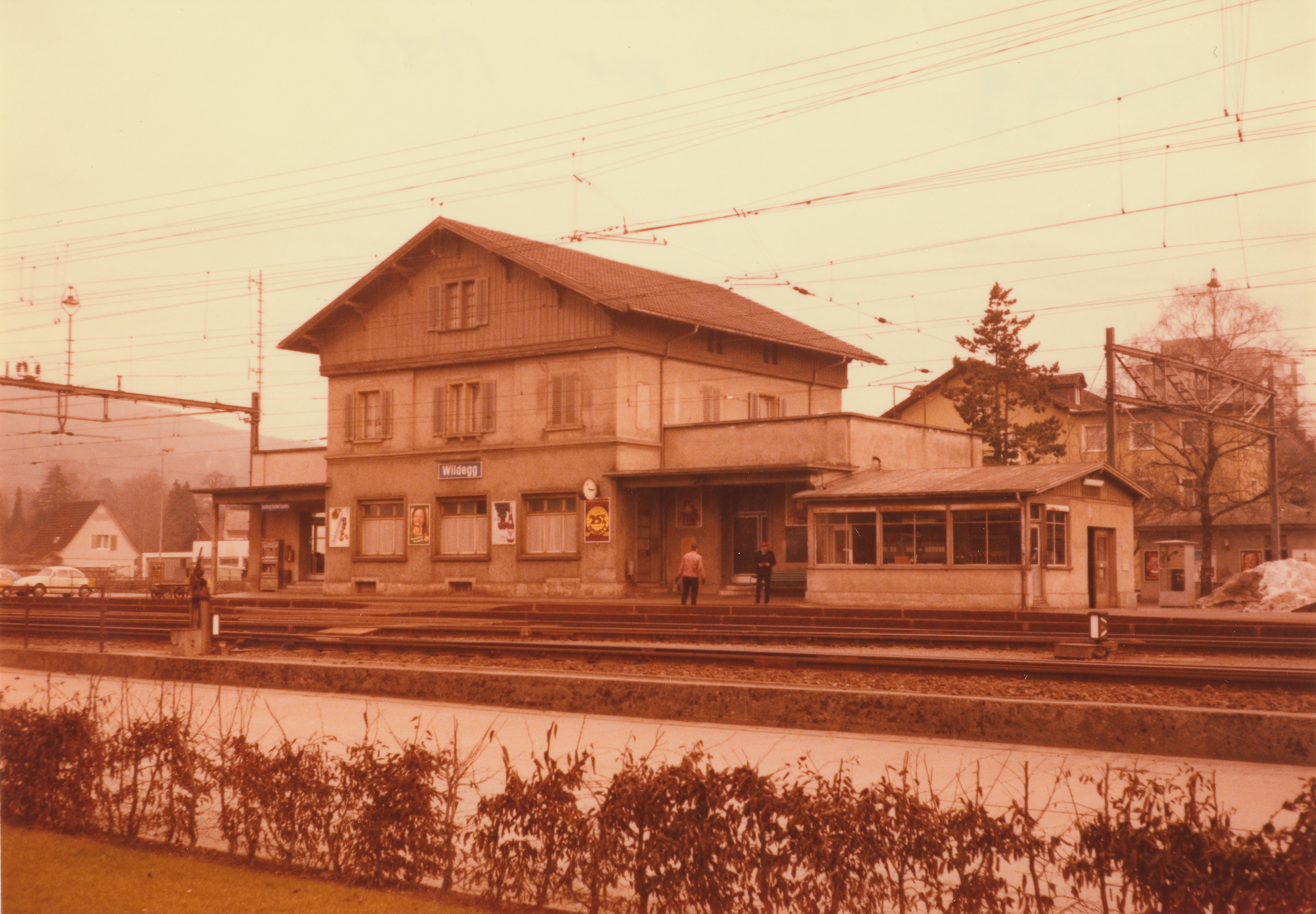
Station building ca. 1980
