= Oberkirch railway station =

Swiss railway station

Oberkirch
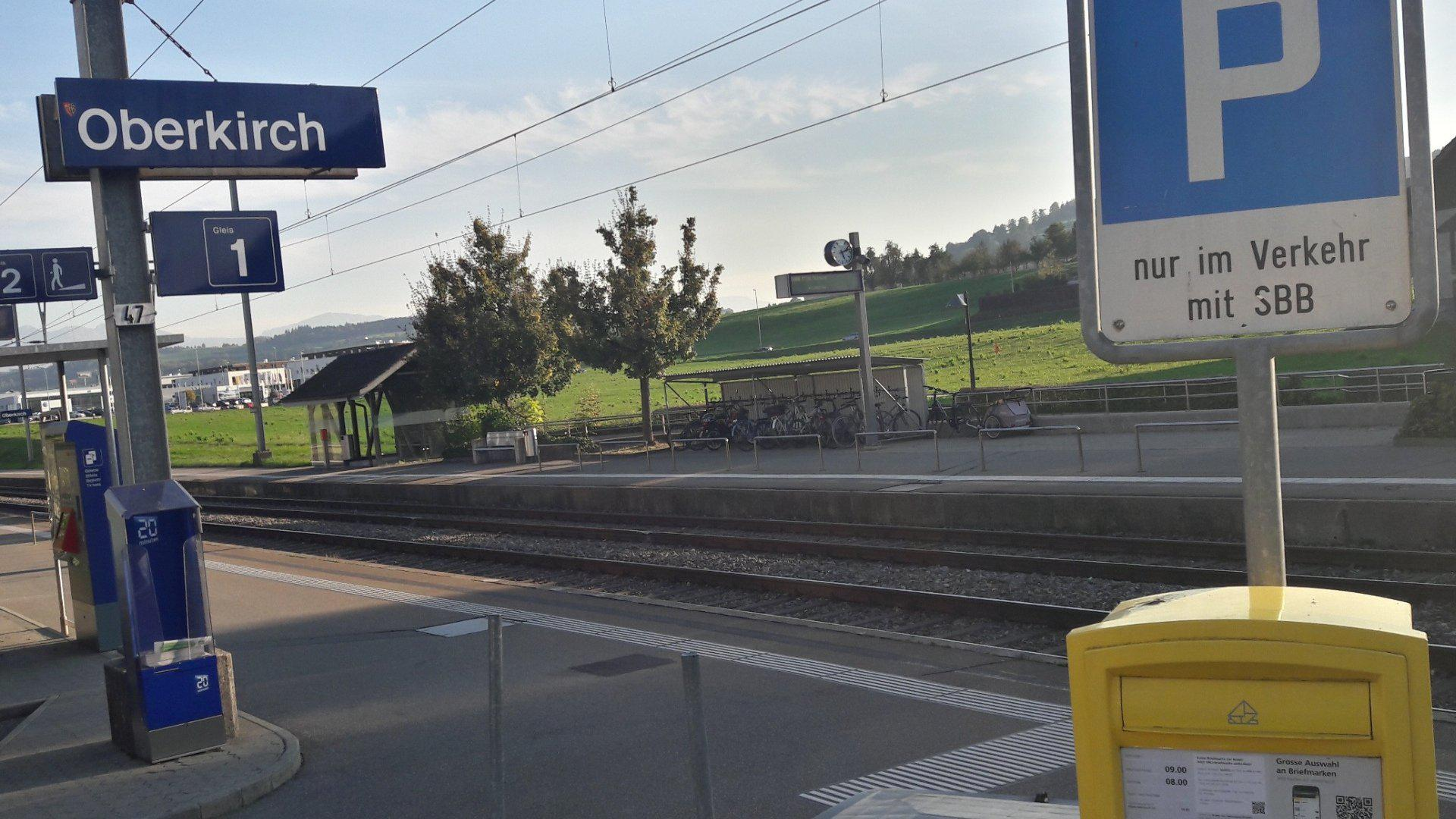
- The station platforms in 2018

General information
- Location: Oberkirch; Switzerland
- Coordinates: 47°10′N 8°07′E
- Owner: Swiss Federal Railways
- Line: Olten–Lucerne line
- Train operators: Swiss Federal Railways

Services
| Preceding station | Lucerne S-Bahn | Following station |
|---|---|---|
| Sursee Terminus | S1 | Nottwil towards Baar |
Location
- Location within Switzerland Location within Canton of Lucerne

Oberkirch railway station (German: Bahnhof Oberkirch), also known as Oberkirch LU railway station, is a railway station in the municipality of Oberkirch, in the Swiss canton of Lucerne. It is an intermediate stop on the standard gauge Olten–Lucerne line of Swiss Federal Railways.

== Services ==
The following services stop at Oberkirch:

- Lucerne S-Bahn S1: half-hourly service between Sursee and Baar.

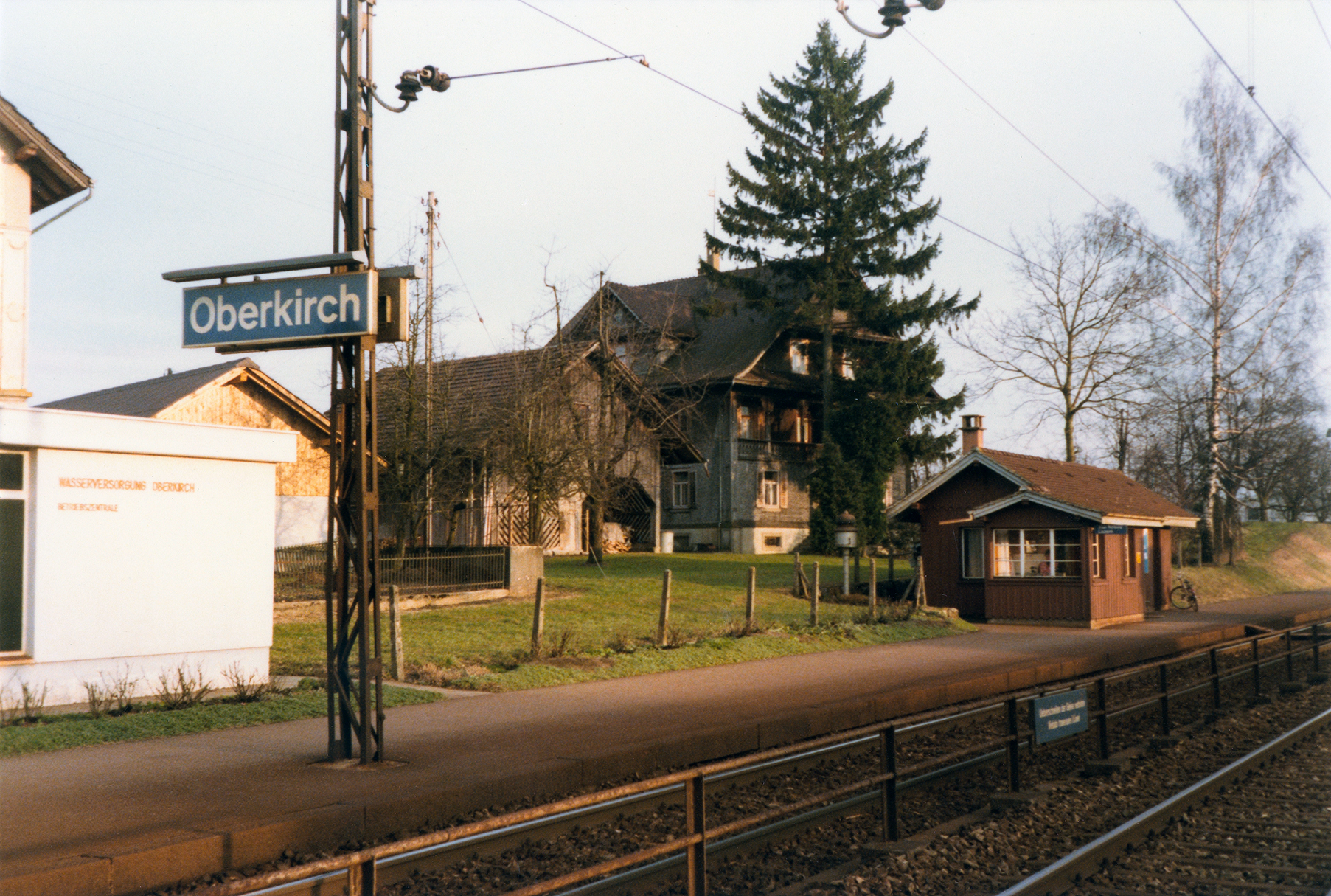
station, 1980
