= Wauwil railway station =

Railway station in Switzerland

Wauwil
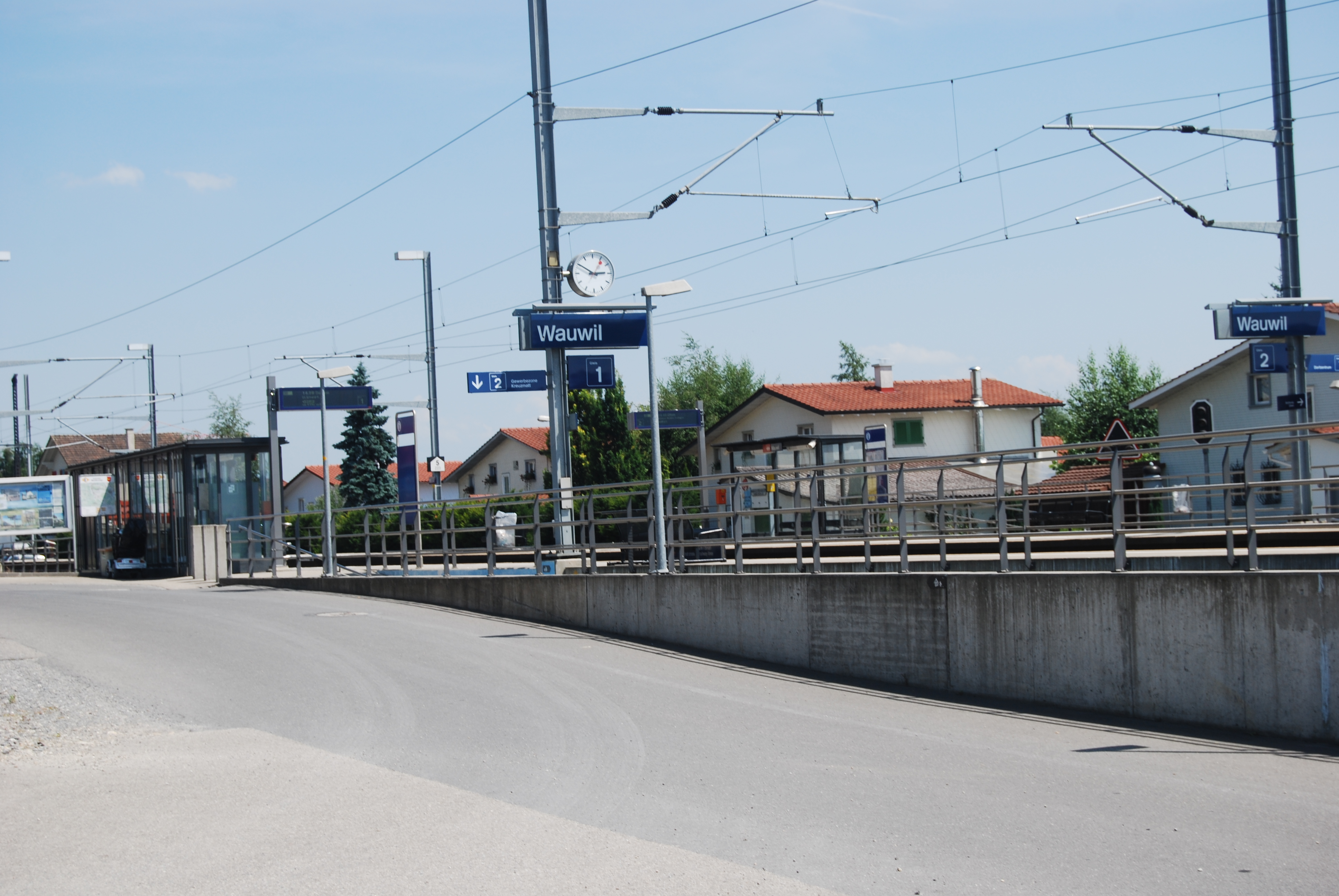
- The station platforms in 2010

General information
- Location: Wauwil; Switzerland
- Coordinates: 47°11′N 8°01′E
- Owner: Swiss Federal Railways
- Line: Olten–Lucerne line
- Distance: 62.5 km (38.8 mi) from Basel SBB
- Train operators: Swiss Federal Railways

Passengers
- 2018: 1100 per weekday

Services
Preceding station	SBB CFF FFS	Following station
Nebikon towards Olten	RE24	Sursee towards Lucerne
Preceding station	Aargau S-Bahn	Following station
Nebikon towards Turgi	S29	St. Erhard-Knutwil towards Sursee
Location
- Location within Switzerland Location within Canton of Lucerne

Wauwil railway station (German: Bahnhof Wauwil) is a railway station in the municipality of Wauwil, in the Swiss canton of Lucerne. It is an intermediate stop on the standard gauge Olten–Lucerne line of Swiss Federal Railways.

== Services ==
The following services stop at Wauwil:

- RegioExpress: hourly service between Olten and Lucerne.
- Aargau S-Bahn S29: hourly service between Sursee and Turgi.
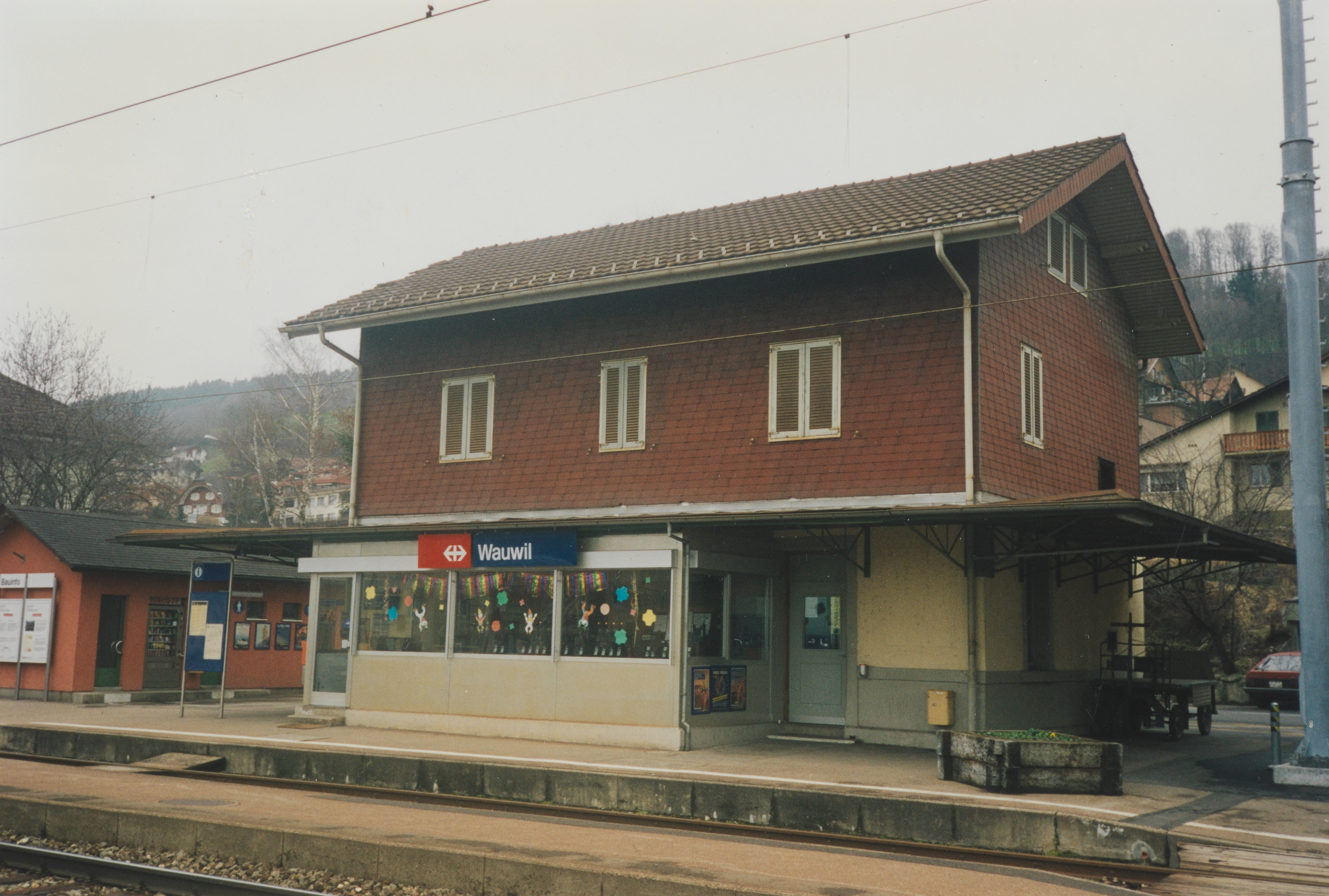
old station building in 2000

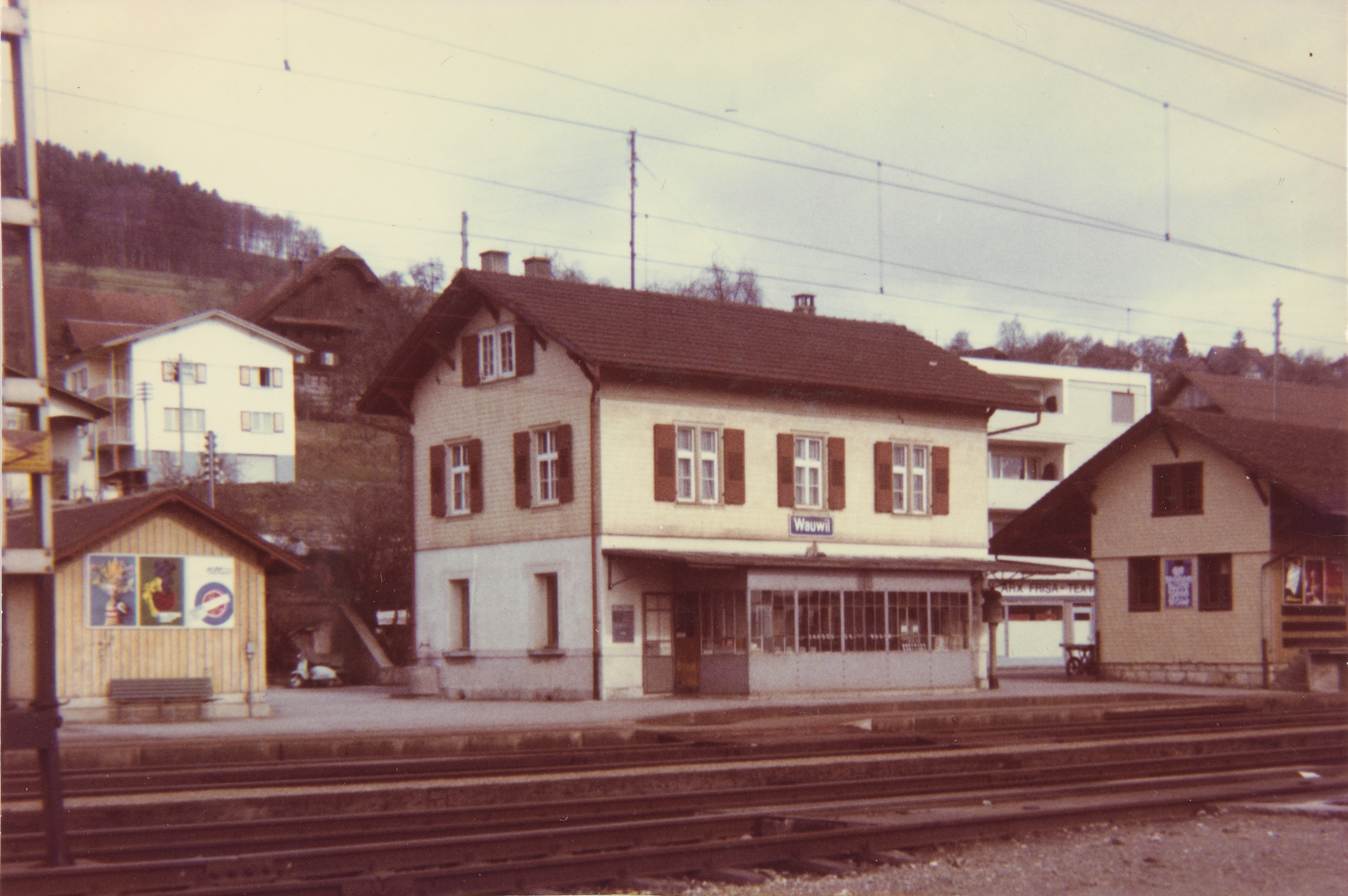
station building and goods shed, ca. 1980
