= St. Erhard-Knutwil railway station =

Railway station in Switzerland

St. Erhard-Knutwil
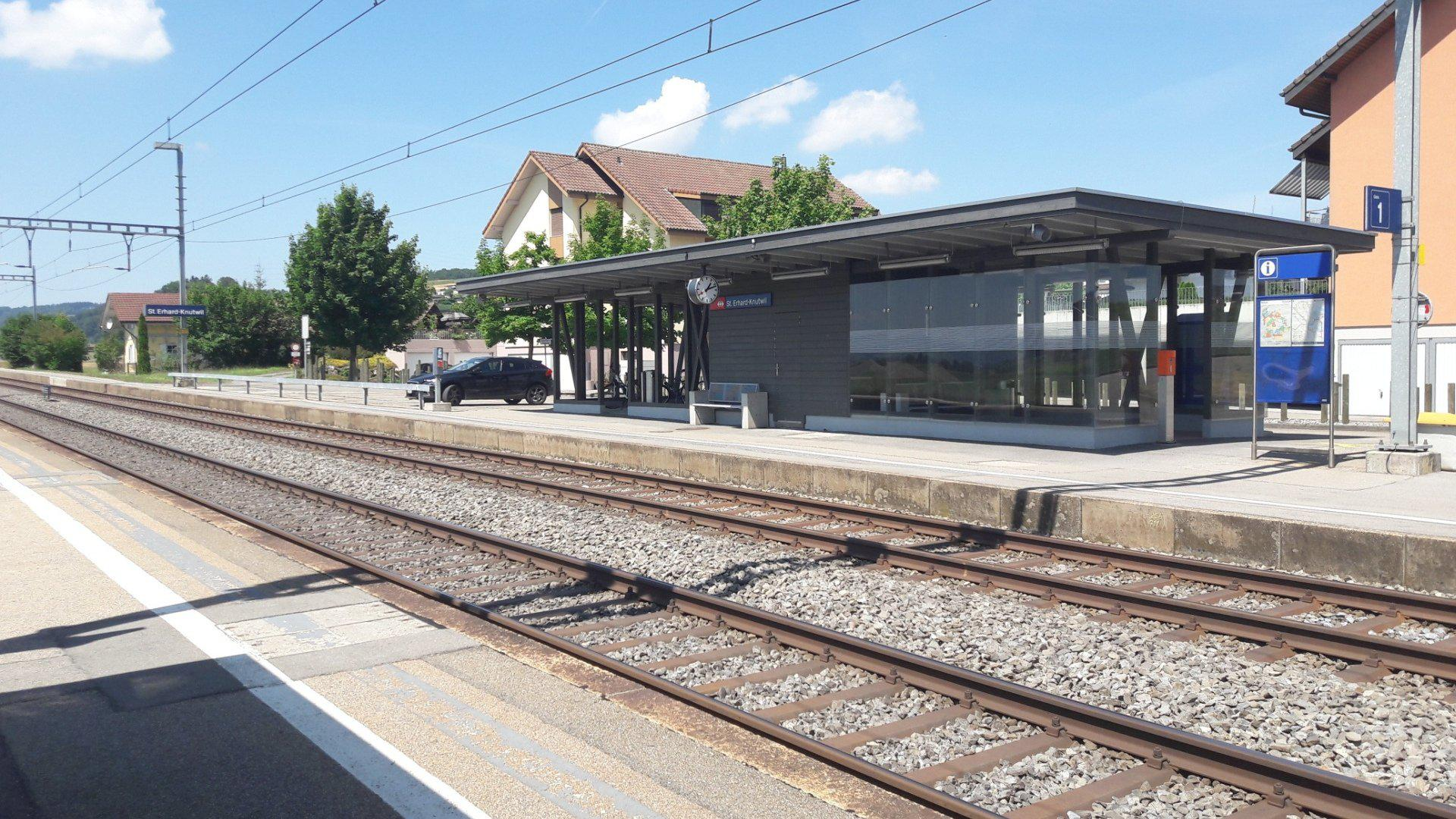
- The station platforms in 2018

General information
- Location: Knutwil; Switzerland
- Coordinates: 47°11′N 8°04′E
- Owner: Swiss Federal Railways
- Line: Olten–Lucerne line
- Distance: 66.8 km (41.5 mi) from Basel SBB
- Train operators: Swiss Federal Railways

Passengers
- 2018: 140 per weekday

Services
Preceding station	Aargau S-Bahn	Following station
Wauwil towards Turgi	S29	Sursee Terminus
Location
- Location within Switzerland Location within Canton of Lucerne

St. Erhard-Knutwil railway station (German: Bahnhof St. Erhard-Knutwil) is a railway station in the municipality of Knutwil, in the Swiss canton of Lucerne. It is an intermediate stop on the standard gauge Olten–Lucerne line of Swiss Federal Railways.

== Services ==
The following services stop at St. Erhard-Knutwil:

- Aargau S-Bahn S29: hourly service between Sursee and Turgi.
