= Sursee railway station =

Swiss railway station

Sursee
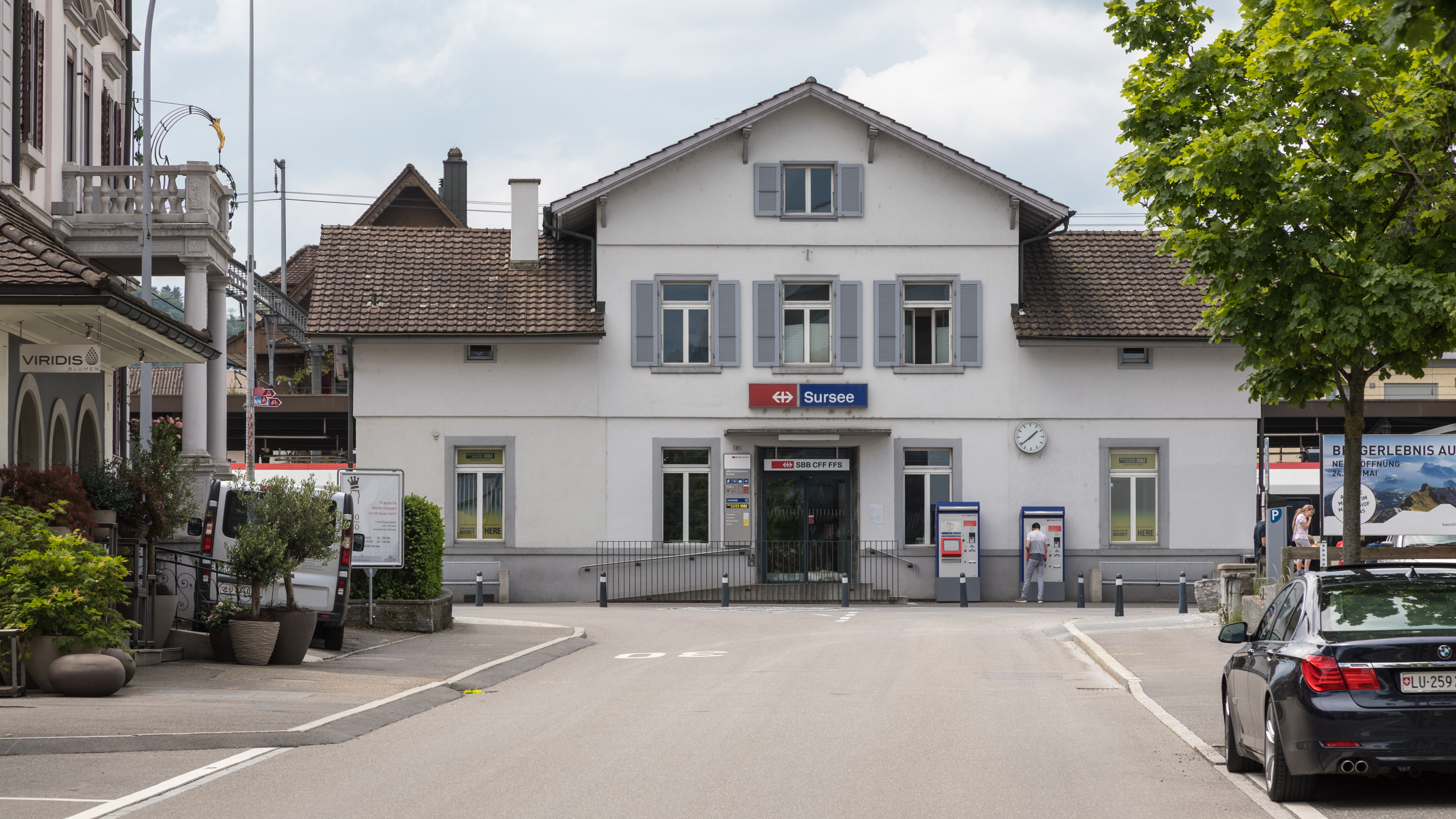
- The station building in 2019

General information
- Location: Sursee; Switzerland
- Coordinates: 47°10′16″N 8°05′53″E
- Owner: Swiss Federal Railways
- Line: Olten–Lucerne line
- Train operators: Swiss Federal Railways

Passengers
- 2025: 13,400 per day (SBB, SOB)
- Rank: 61 out of 1,095

Services
Preceding station	SBB CFF FFS	Following station
Zofingen towards Geneva Airport	IR 15	Lucerne Terminus
Zofingen towards Basel SBB	IR 27	Lucerne Terminus
Wauwil towards Olten	RE24	Sempach-Neuenkirch towards Lucerne
Preceding station	Aargau S-Bahn	Following station
Terminus	S29	St. Erhard-Knutwil towards Turgi
Preceding station	Lucerne S-Bahn	Following station
Terminus	S1	Oberkirch towards Baar
Location
- Location within Switzerland Location within Canton of Lucerne

Sursee railway station (German: Bahnhof Sursee) is a railway station in the municipality of Sursee, in the Swiss canton of Lucerne. It is an intermediate stop on the standard gauge Olten–Lucerne line of Swiss Federal Railways. The freight-only Sursee–Triengen line diverges from the Olten–Lucerne line just north of the station.

== Services ==
The following services stop at Sursee:

- InterRegio:
  - hourly service between Geneva Airport and Lucerne.
  - hourly service between Basel SBB and Lucerne.
- RegioExpress: hourly service between Olten and Lucerne.
- Lucerne S-Bahn S1: half-hourly service to Baar.
- Aargau S-Bahn S29: hourly service to Turgi.
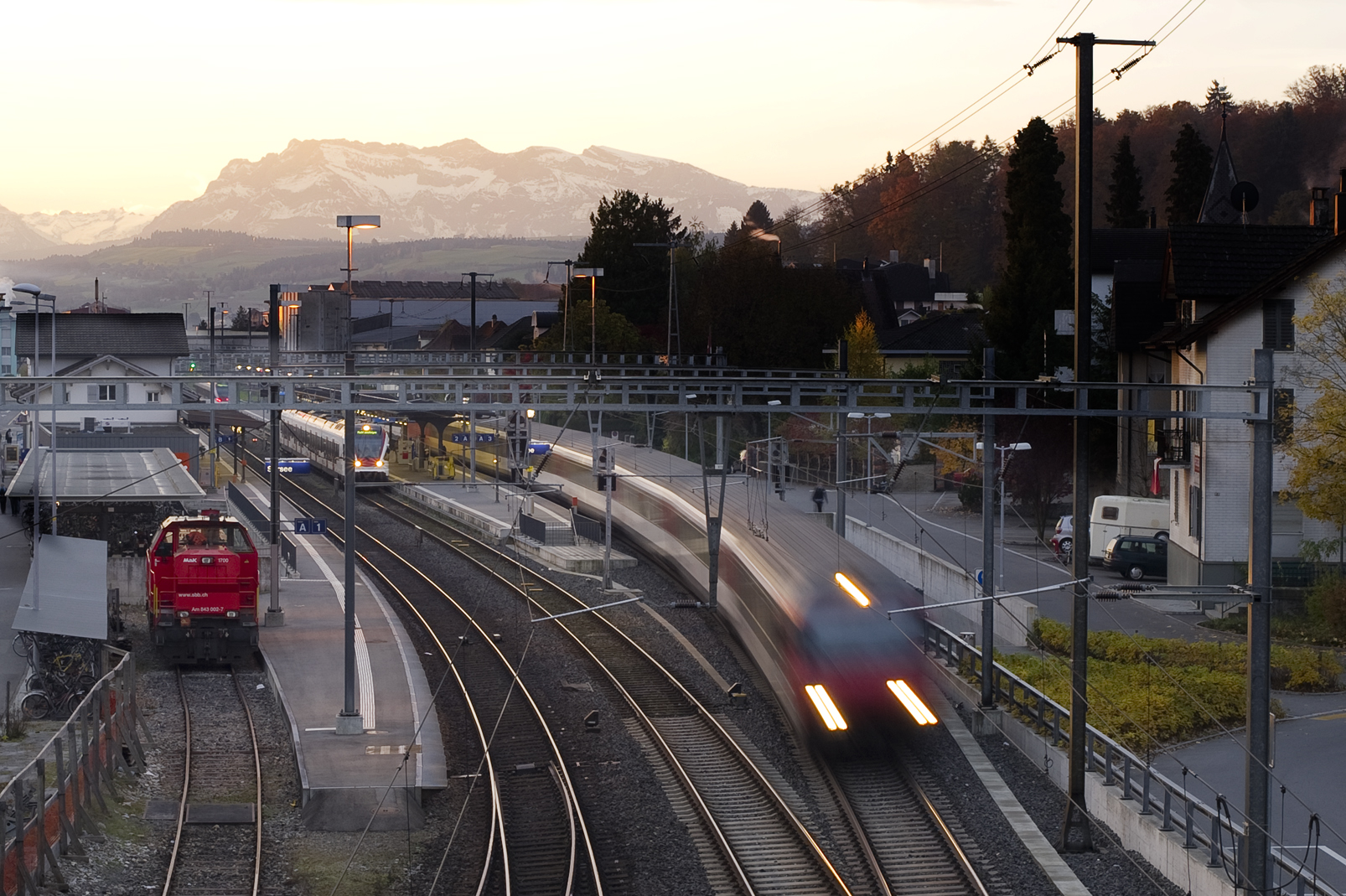
general view from above, 2010

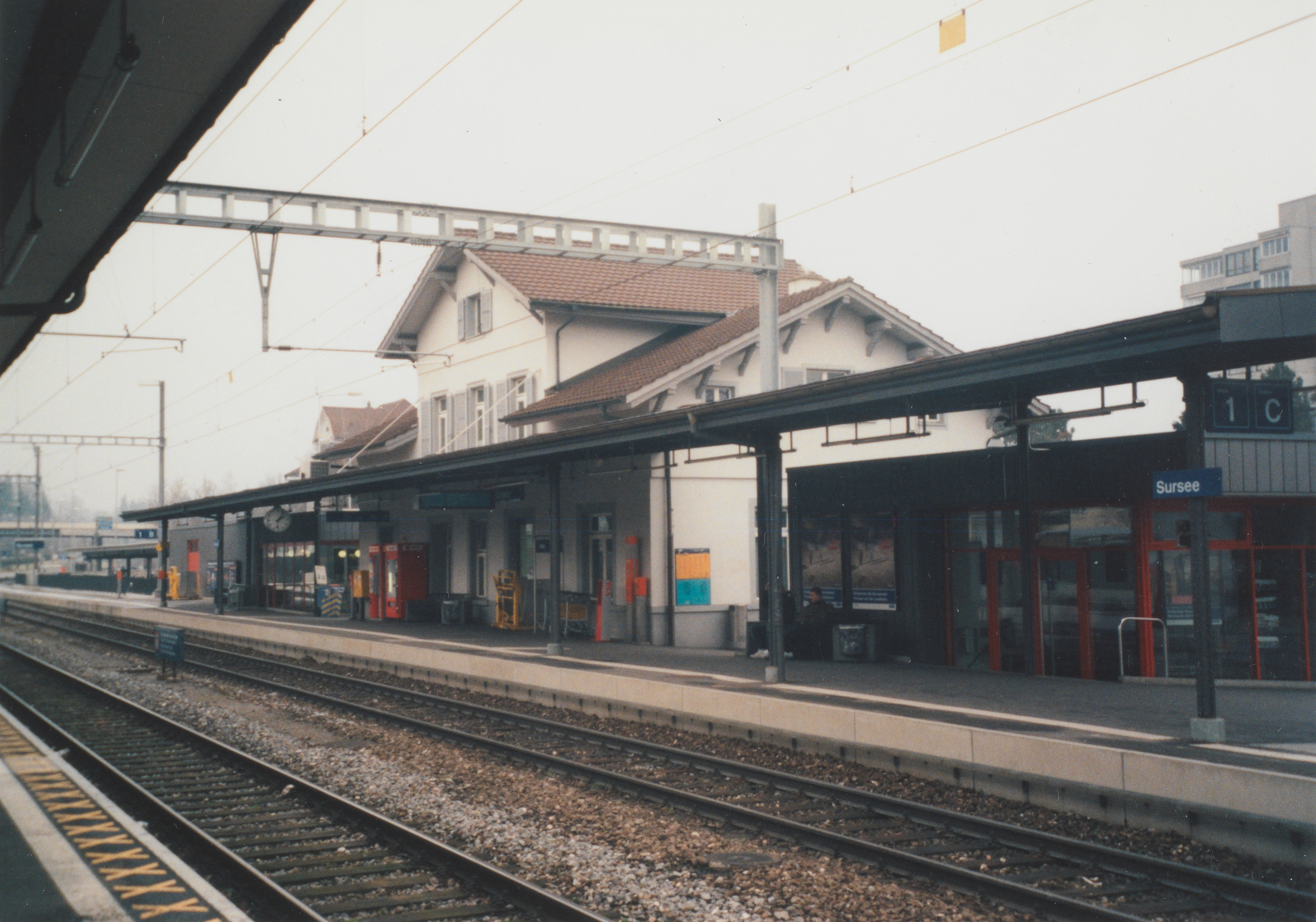
station building in 2008

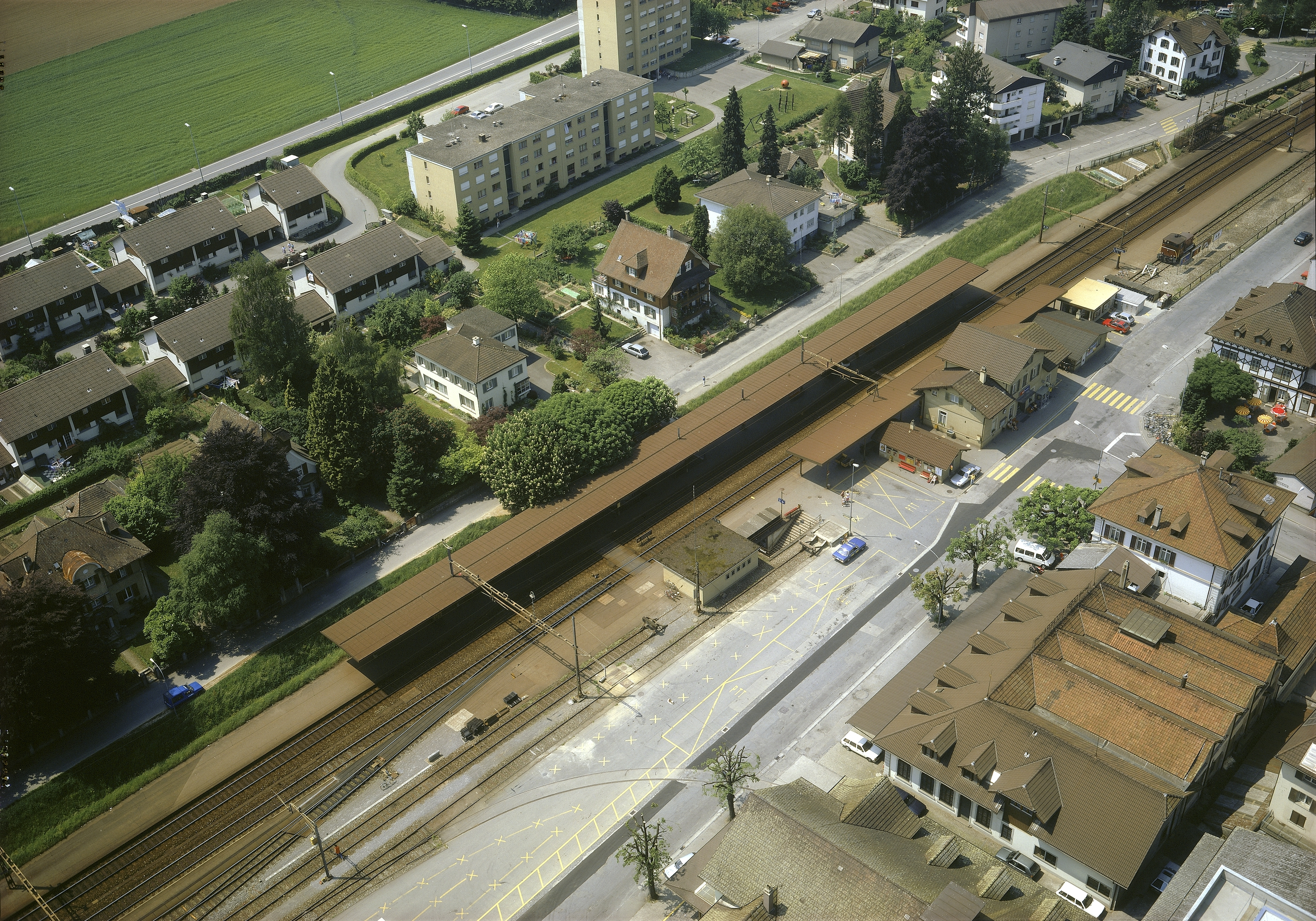
aerial view, 1989

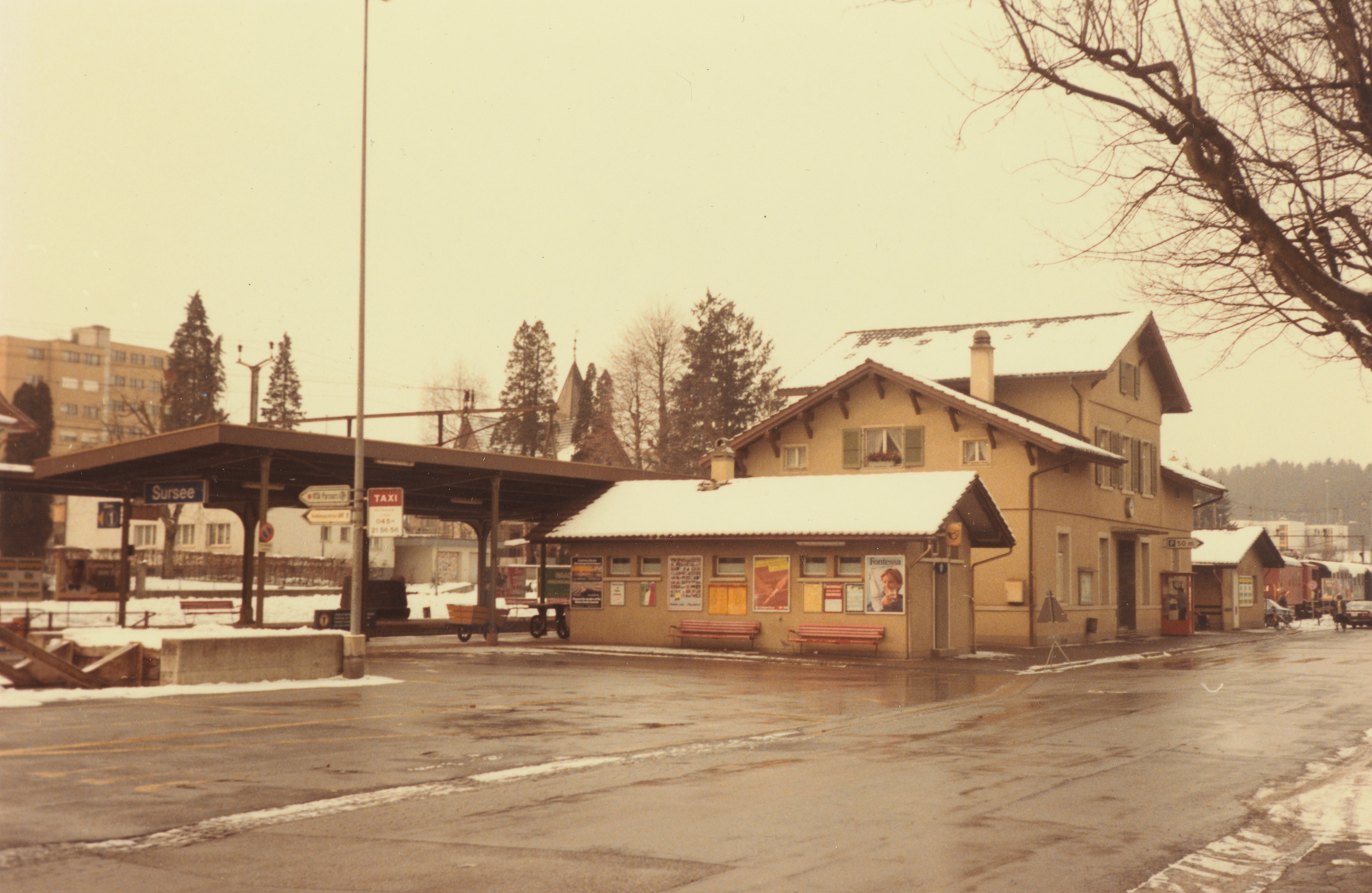
station building, street side with snow, 1986
