= Olten–Lucerne railway =

Railway line in Switzerland

Olten–Lucerne
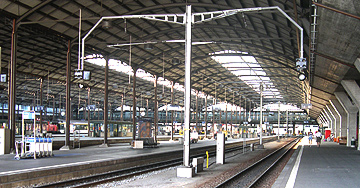
- Lucerne station

Overview
- Termini: Olten; Lucerne

Technical
- Number of tracks: 2
- Track gauge: 1,435 mm (4 ft 8 1/2 in)
- Electrification: 15 kV/16.7 Hz AC overhead catenary

The Olten–Lucerne railway line is one of the major railway lines of Switzerland, running between Olten and Lucerne. It was built by the Schweizerische Centralbahn and opened to Lucerne in 1856. The Schweizerische Centralbahn was taken over by the Swiss Federal Railways in 1902. The line is 1,435 mm (4 ft 8 1/2 in) standard gauge and electrified at 15 kV 16.7 Hz and has two tracks.

Passenger services consist of a mixture of intercity, inter-regional and regional express services between Basel and Lucerne, some to or from Chiasso. There are also half-hour S-Bahn services between Lucern and Sursee (S18) and hourly services between Sursee and Olten (S22).
