= Othmarsingen railway station =

Railway station in Switzerland

Othmarsingen
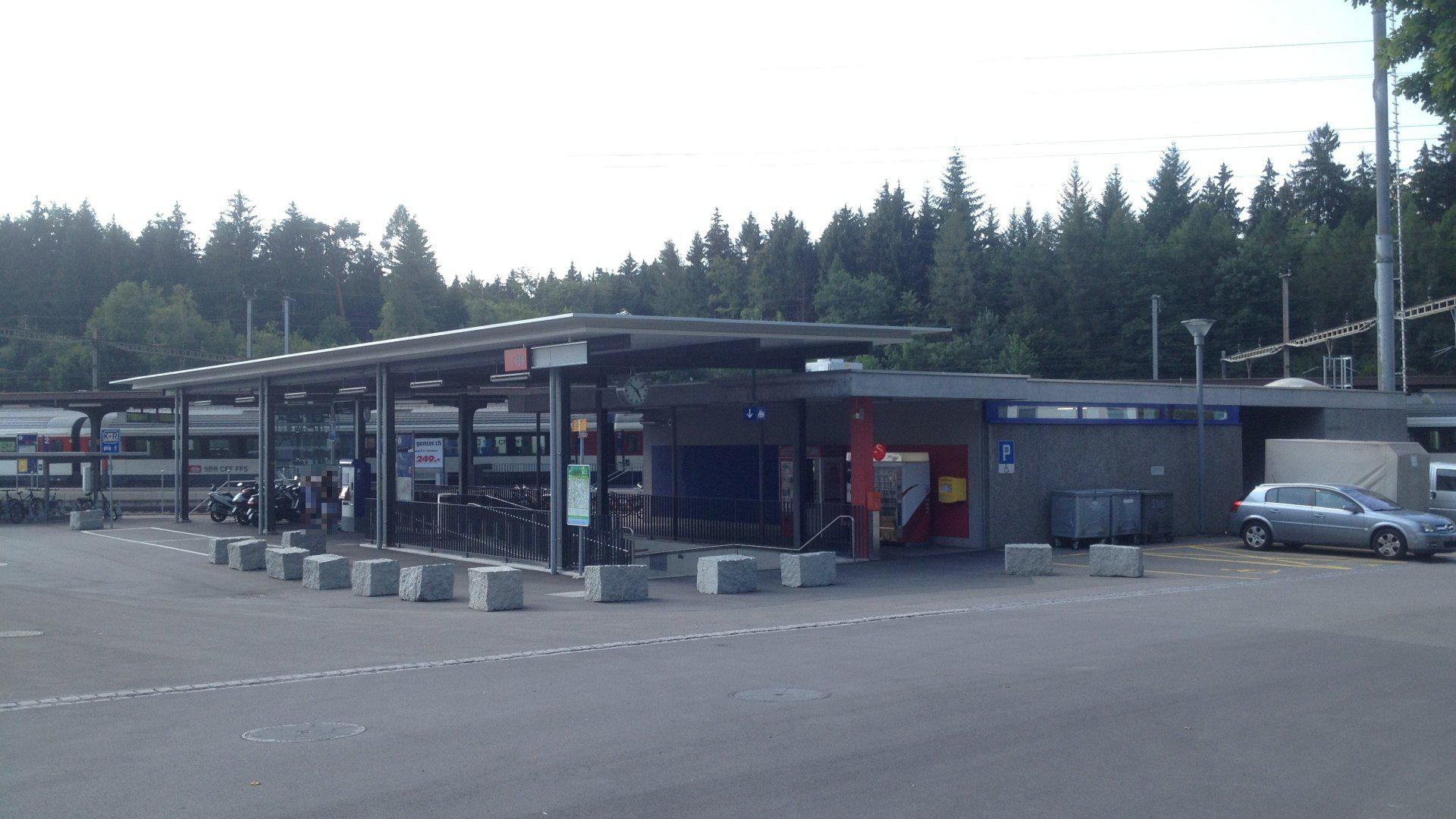
- The station building in 2018

General information
- Location: Othmarsingen; Switzerland
- Coordinates: 47°24′27″N 8°12′53″E
- Elevation: 419 m (1,375 ft)
- Owner: Swiss Federal Railways
- Lines: Brugg–Hendschiken line; Heitersberg line; Zofingen–Wettingen line
- Distance: 8.7 km (5.4 mi) from Brugg AG; 27.7 km (17.2 mi) from Zürich Hauptbahnhof
- Train operators: Swiss Federal Railways
- Connections: Regionalbus Lenzburg AG

Other information
- Fare zone: 530 (Tarifverbund A-Welle)

Passengers
- 2018: 1500 per weekday

Services
| Preceding station | Zurich S-Bahn | Following station |
|---|---|---|
| Lenzburg towards Aarau | S11 | Mägenwil towards Seuzach or Wila |
| Hendschiken towards Muri AG | S42 | Dietikon towards Zürich HB |
| Lenzburg towards Aarau | SN1 Limited service | Birr towards Winterthur |
| Lenzburg towards Olten | SN11 Limited service | Mägenwil towards Winterthur |
| Preceding station | Aargau S-Bahn | Following station |
| Lenzburg towards Langenthal | S23 | Birr towards Baden |
| Hendschiken towards Muri AG | S25 | Birr towards Brugg AG |
Location
- Location within Switzerland Location within Canton of Aargau

Othmarsingen railway station is a railway station in the municipality of Othmarsingen in the Swiss canton of Aargau. The station is located at the junction of the standard gauge Brugg–Hendschiken, Heitersberg, and Zofingen–Wettingen lines of Swiss Federal Railways.

== Services ==
As of the December 2023 timetable change, the following services stop at Othmarsingen, including two nighttime services (SN1, SN11):

- Zurich S-Bahn:
  - S11: half-hourly service between Aarau and Winterthur; hourly service to Seuzach or Sennhof-Kyburg; rush-hour service to Wila.
  - S42: rush-hour service between Muri AG and Zürich Hauptbahnhof.
  - SN1: on Friday and Saturday night, hourly service between Aarau and Winterthur via Zürich Stadelhofen.
  - SN11: hourly service between Winterthur and Olten, via Zürich HB.
- Aargau S-Bahn:
  - S23: hourly service between Langenthal and Baden.
  - S25: hourly service between Muri AG and Brugg AG.

== See also ==
- Rail transport in Switzerland
