= Lupfig railway station =

Railway station in Switzerland

Lupfig
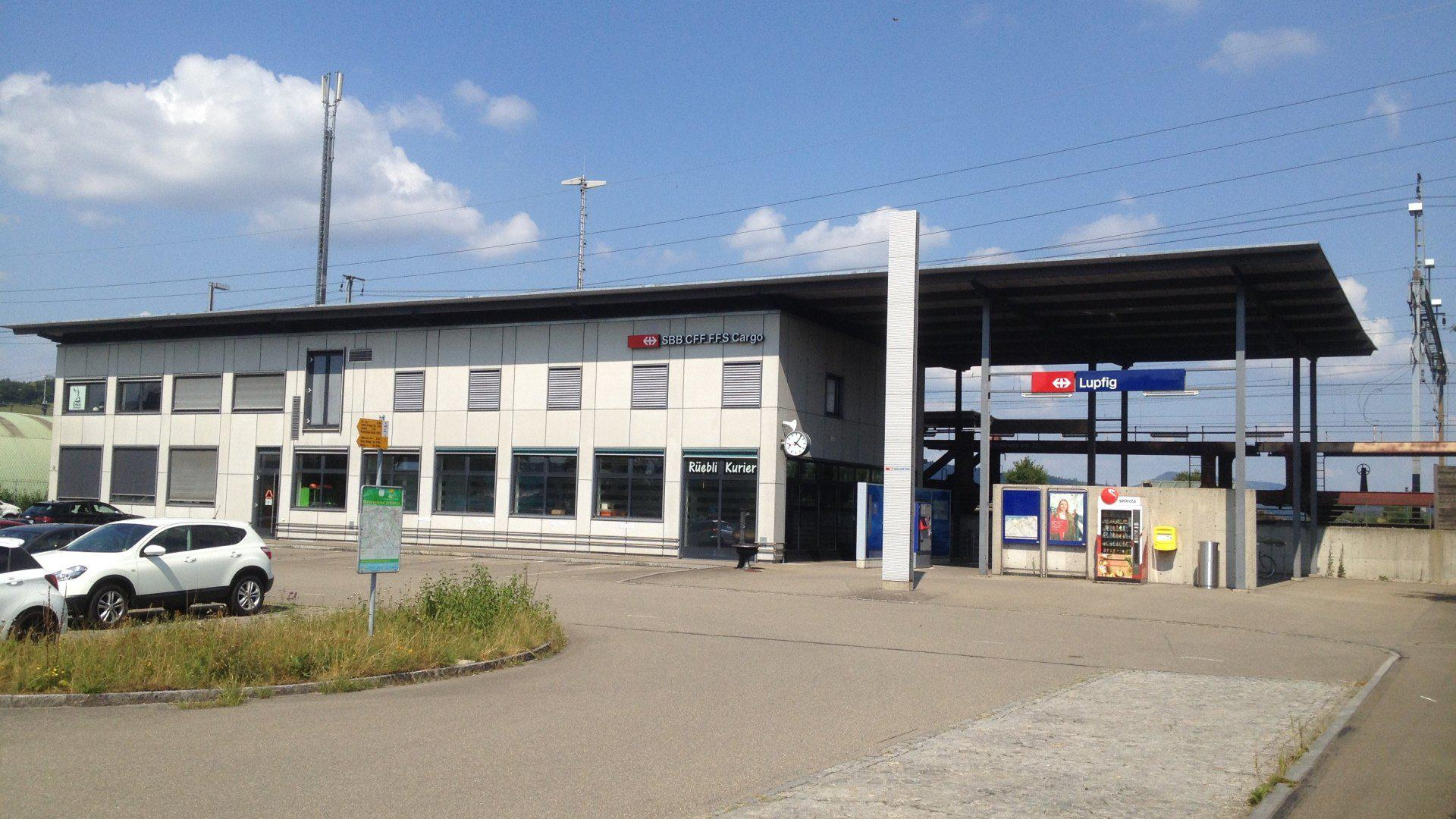
- The station building in 2018

General information
- Location: Lupfig; Switzerland
- Coordinates: 47°26′43″N 8°12′54″E
- Owner: Swiss Federal Railways
- Line: Brugg–Hendschiken line
- Distance: 4.2 km (2.6 mi) from Brugg AG
- Train operators: Swiss Federal Railways

Other information
- Fare zone: 551 (Tarifverbund A-Welle)

Passengers
- 2018: 430 per weekday

Services
Preceding station	Aargau S-Bahn	Following station
Birr towards Langenthal	S23	Brugg AG towards Baden
Birr towards Muri AG	S25	Brugg AG Terminus
Preceding station	Zurich S-Bahn	Following station
Birr towards Aarau	SN1 Limited service	Brugg AG towards Winterthur
Location

Lupfig railway station (German: Bahnhof Lupfig) is a railway station in the municipality of Lupfig, in the Swiss canton of Aargau. It is an intermediate stop on the standard gauge Brugg–Hendschiken line of Swiss Federal Railways.

The station was built in 1994 and replaced Birrfeld railway station, 300 m away.

== Services ==
As of the December 2023 timetable change, the following services stop at Lupfig:

- Aargau S-Bahn:
  - S23: hourly service between Langenthal and Baden.
  - S25: hourly service between Muri AG and Brugg AG.
- Zürich S-Bahn SN1: on Friday and Saturday night, hourly service between Aarau and Winterthur via Zürich Stadelhofen.
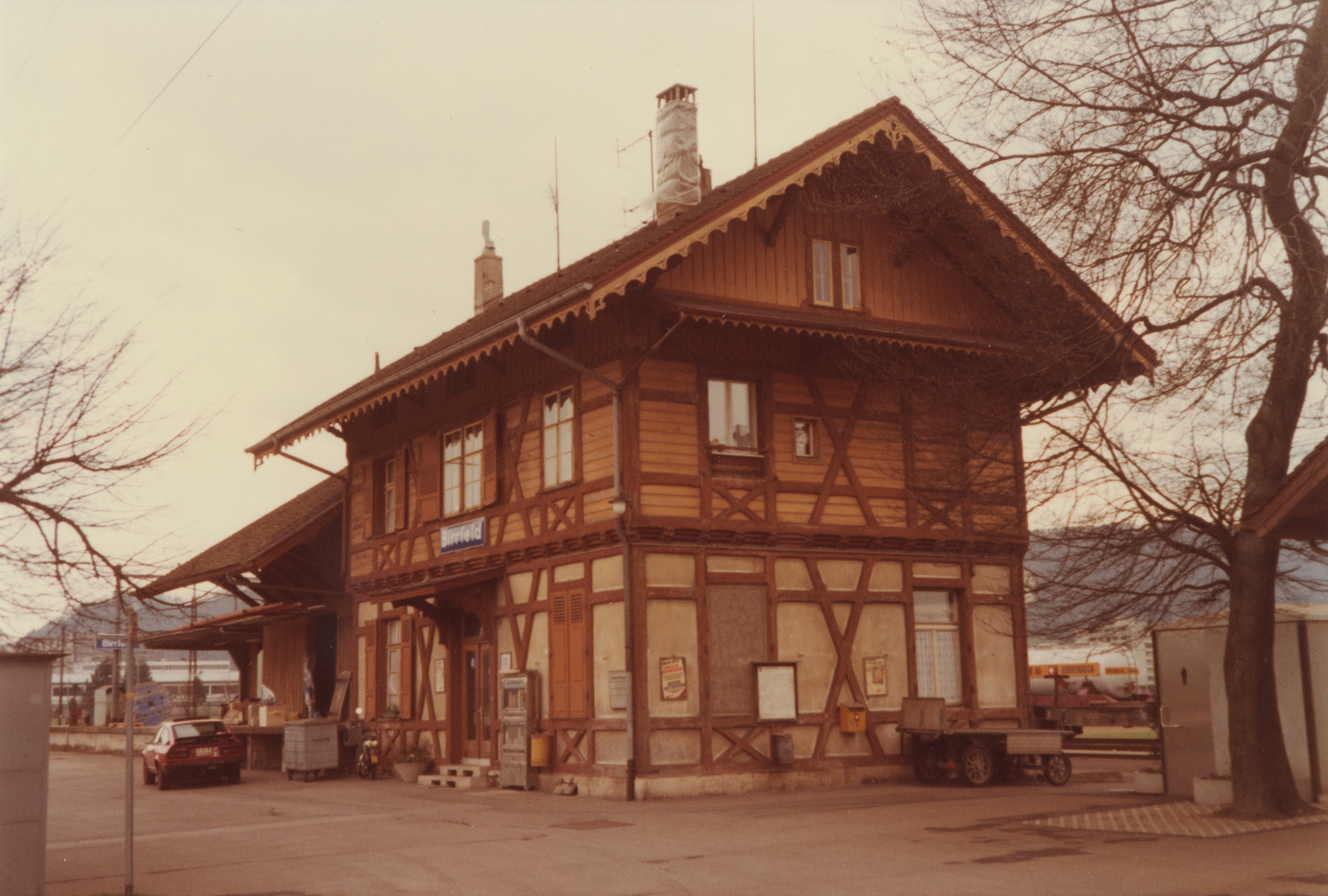
Birrfeld railway station in 1982

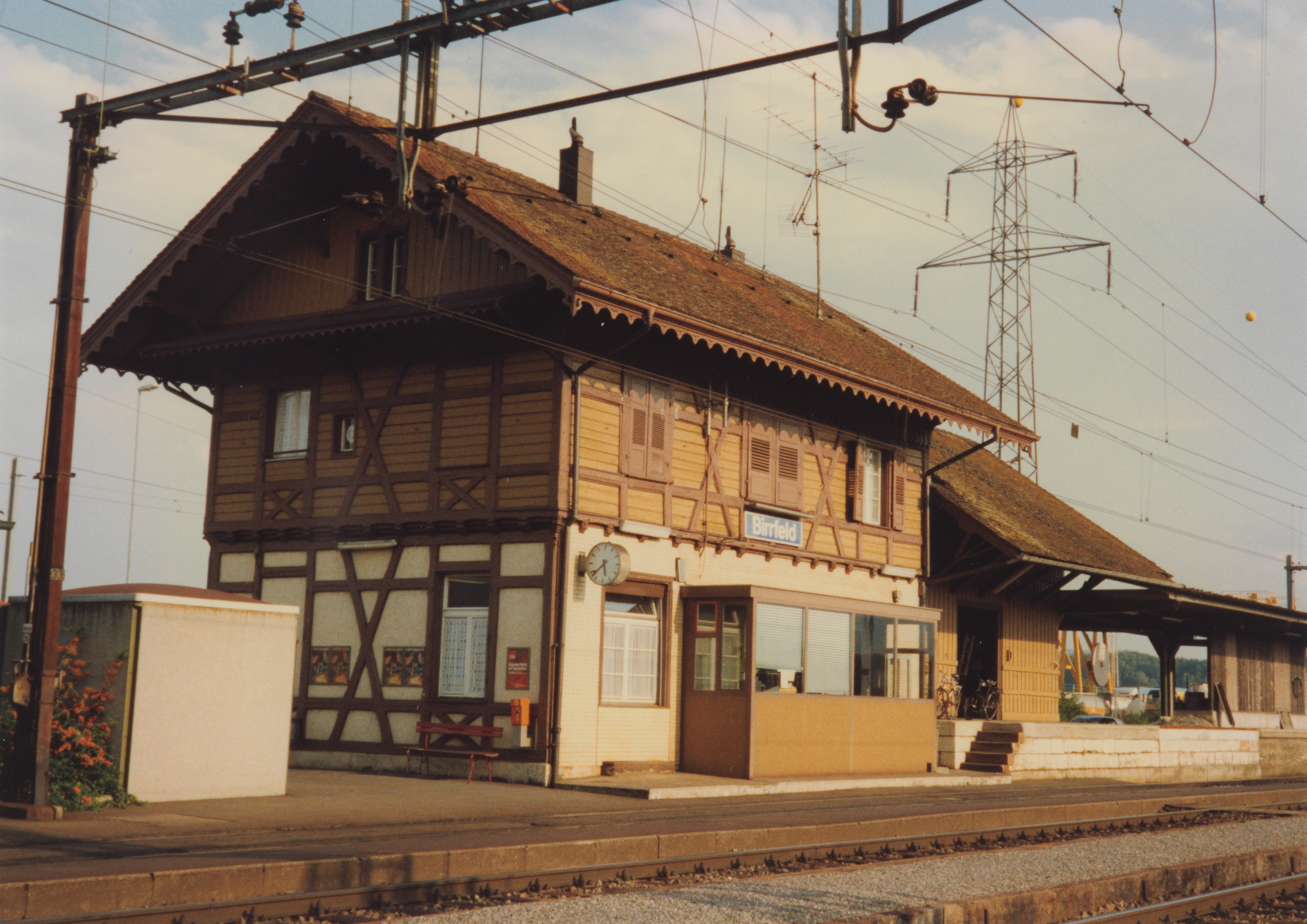
Birrfeld railway station in 1990

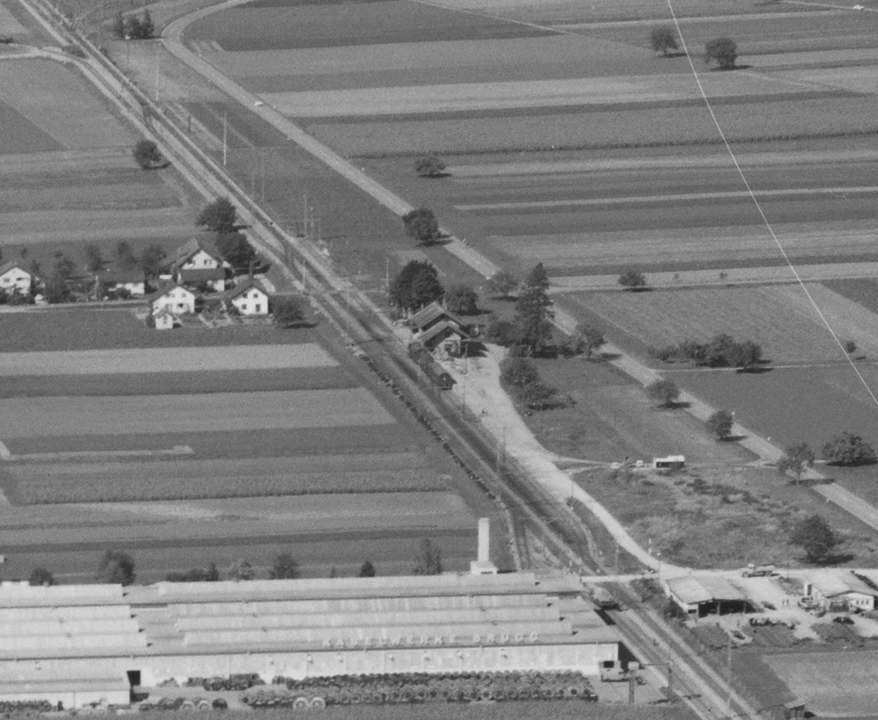
Birrfeld railway station, aerial view in 1982
