= Dottikon-Dintikon railway station =

Railway station in Villmergen, Switzerland

Dottikon-Dintikon
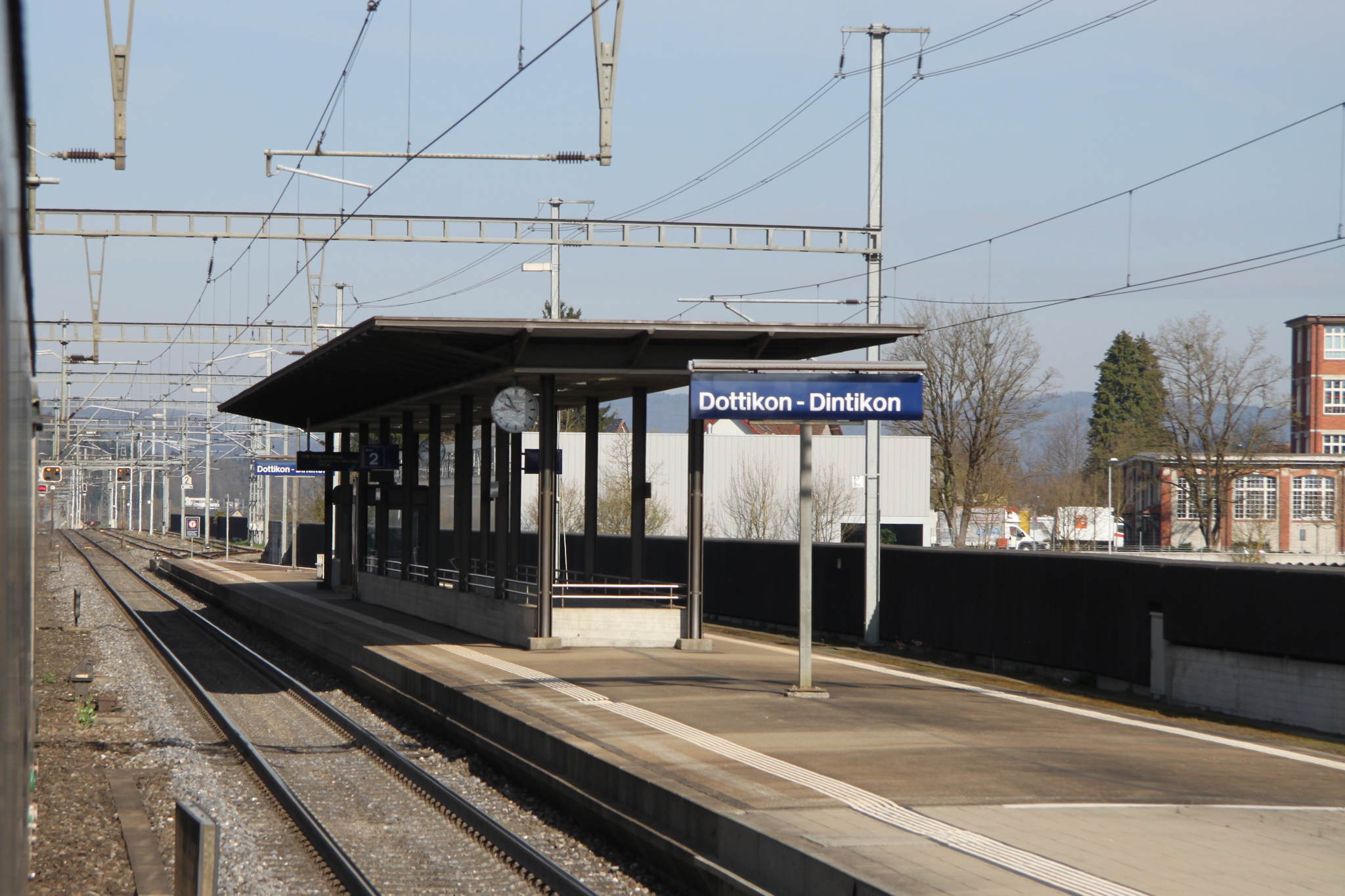
- The station platform in 2015

General information
- Location: Villmergen; Switzerland
- Coordinates: 47°22′N 8°14′E
- Owner: Swiss Federal Railways
- Line: Rupperswil–Immensee line
- Distance: 67.9 km (42.2 mi) from Basel SBB
- Train operators: Swiss Federal Railways
- Connections: PostAuto Schweiz buses

Passengers
- 2018: 1,900 per weekday

Services
Preceding station	Zurich S-Bahn	Following station
Hendschiken towards Zürich Hauptbahnhof	S42	Wohlen towards Muri AG
Preceding station	Aargau S-Bahn	Following station
Hendschiken towards Brugg AG	S25	Wohlen towards Muri AG
Hendschiken towards Olten	S26	Wohlen towards Rotkreuz
Location
- Location within Switzerland Location within Canton of Aargau

Dottikon-Dintikon railway station (German: Bahnhof Dottikon-Dintikon) is a railway station in the municipality of Villmergen, in the Swiss canton of Aargau. It is an intermediate stop on the standard gauge Rupperswil–Immensee line of Swiss Federal Railways.

== Services ==
The following services stop at Dottikon-Dintikon:

- Zürich S-Bahn
  - S42: rush-hour service between Muri AG and Zürich Hauptbahnhof.
  - RE6: week-end service to Arth-Goldau or Lenzburg
  - RE42: rush-hour service between Zürich Hauptbahnhof, Dottikon-Dintikon and Bellinzona (Treno Gottardo)
- Aargau S-Bahn:
  - S25: hourly service between Muri AG and Brugg AG.
  - S26: half-hourly service between Lenzburg and Rotkreuz, with every other train continuing from Lenzburg to Olten.
  - S saisonal Service from Brugg AG to Rotkreuz or in rush-hour from Brugg AG to Immensee
