= Rupperswil railway station =

Railway station in Switzerland

Rupperswil
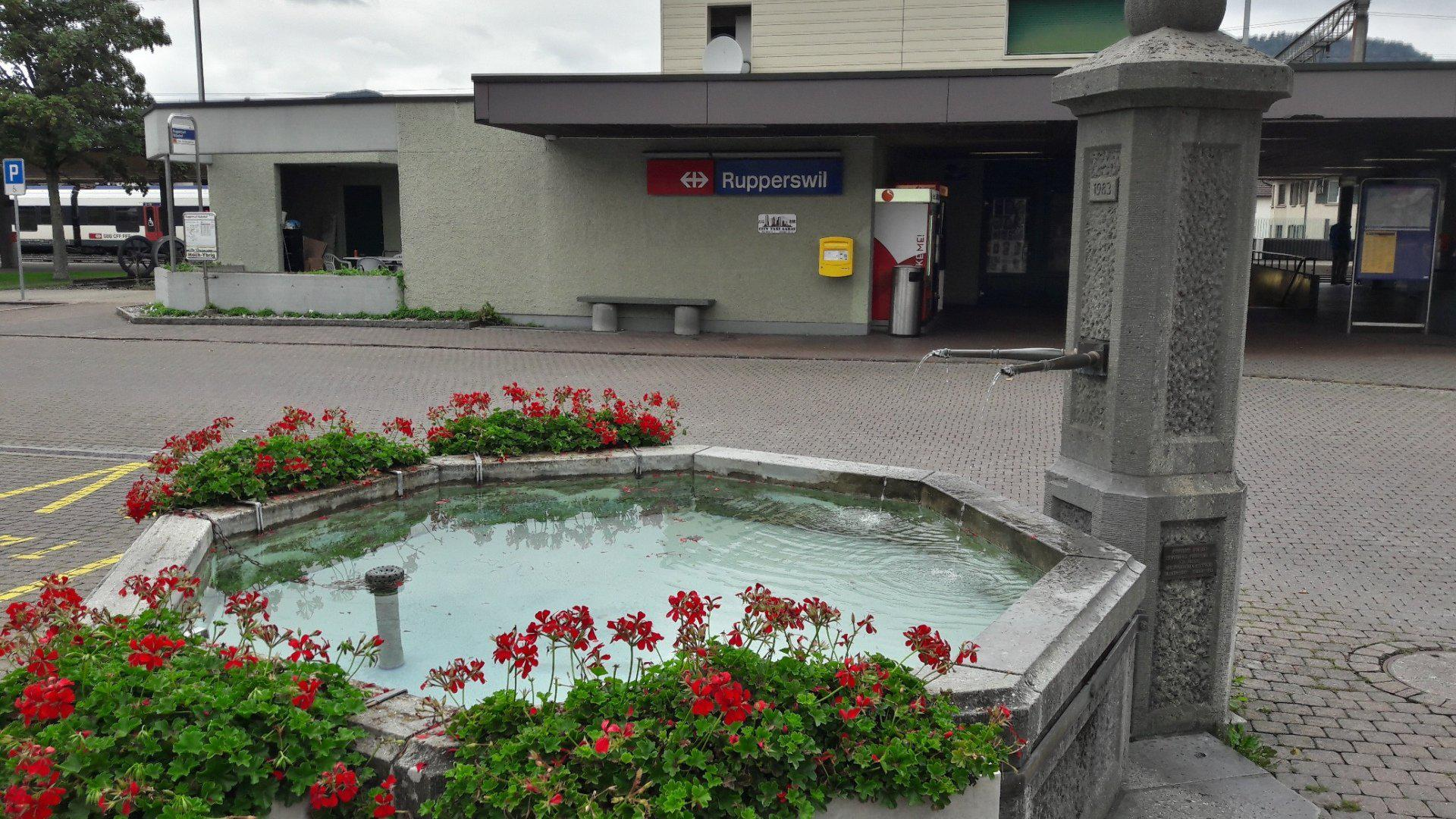
- The station in 2018

General information
- Location: Rupperswil; Switzerland
- Coordinates: 47°24′12″N 8°07′37″E
- Owner: Swiss Federal Railways
- Lines: Baden–Aarau line; Heitersberg line; Rupperswil–Immensee line
- Distance: 35.6 km (22.1 mi) from Zürich HB via Lenzburg; 43.5 km (27.0 mi) from Zürich HB via Brugg AG
- Train operators: Swiss Federal Railways
- Connections: PostAuto Schweiz

Other information
- Fare zone: 511 (Tarifverbund A-Welle)

Services
Preceding station	Aargau S-Bahn	Following station
Aarau towards Langenthal	S23	Lenzburg towards Baden
Aarau towards Sursee	S29	Wildegg towards Turgi
Preceding station	Zurich S-Bahn	Following station
Aarau Terminus	SN1 Limited service	Lenzburg towards Winterthur
Aarau towards Olten	SN11 Limited service	Lenzburg towards Winterthur
Location
- Location within Switzerland Location within Canton of Aargau

Rupperswil railway station (German: Bahnhof Rupperswil) is a railway station in the municipality of Rupperswil, in the Swiss canton of Aargau. It is an intermediate stop on the Baden–Aarau and Heitersberg lines and the northern terminus of the Rupperswil–Immensee line.

== Services ==
As of the December 2023 timetable change, the following services stop at Rupperswil, including two nighttime services (SN1, SN11) offered by the Zürcher Verkehrsverbund (ZVV):

- Aargau S-Bahn:
  - S23: hourly service between Langenthal and Baden.
  - S29: half-hourly service between Aarau and Turgi, with every other train continuing from Aarau to Sursee.
- Zurich S-Bahn:
  - SN1: on Friday and Saturday night, hourly service between Aarau and Winterthur via Zürich Stadelhofen.
  - SN11: on Friday and Saturday night, hourly service between Winterthur and Olten, via Zürich HB.

== See also ==
- Rail transport in Switzerland
