= Birr railway station =

Railway station in Switzerland

Birr
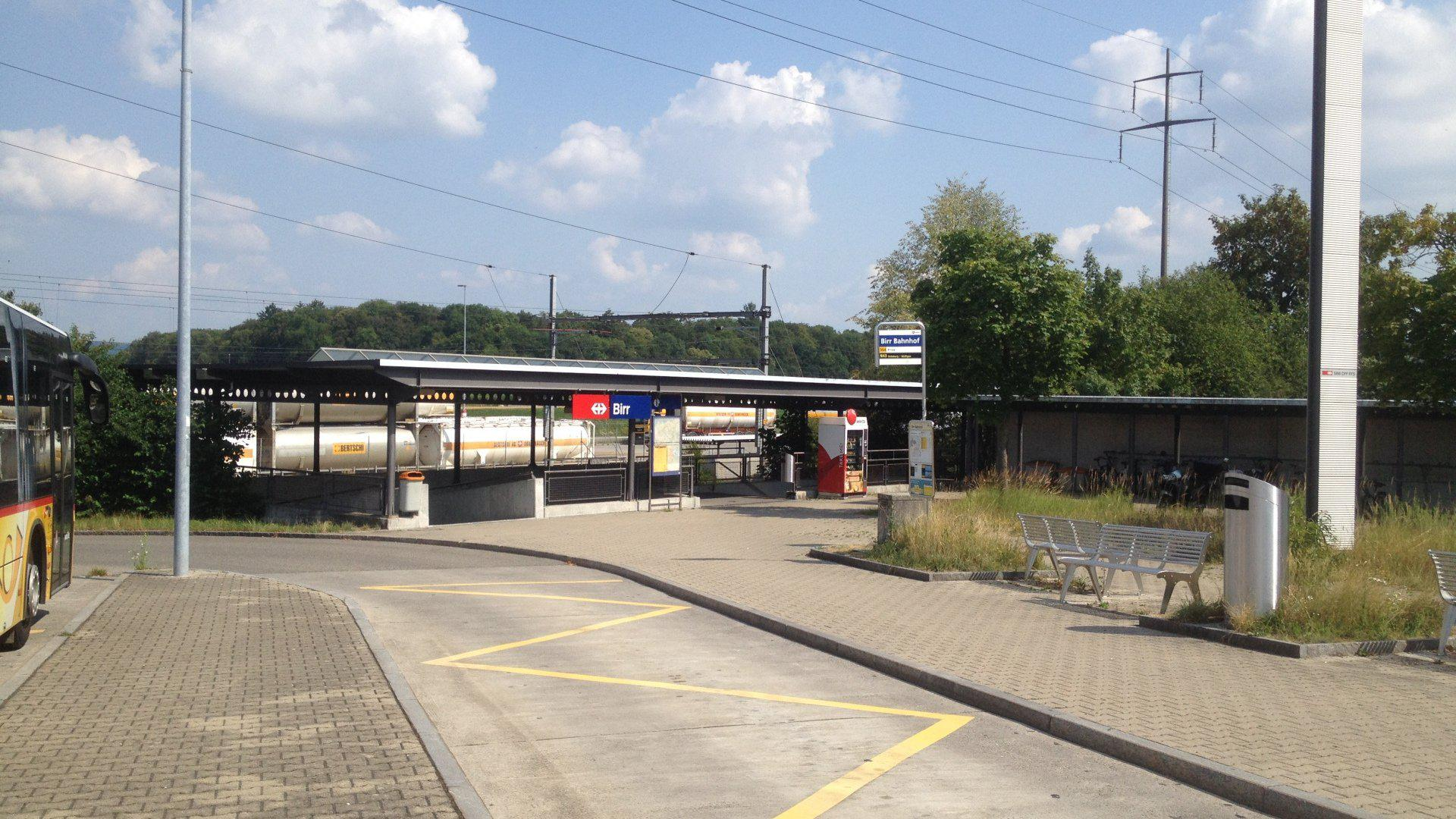
- The station platform in 2018

General information
- Location: Birr, Aargau; Switzerland
- Coordinates: 47°26′09″N 8°13′04″E
- Owner: Swiss Federal Railways
- Line: Brugg–Hendschiken line
- Distance: 5.3 km (3.3 mi) from Brugg AG
- Train operators: Swiss Federal Railways
- Connections: PostAuto Schweiz

Other information
- Fare zone: 551 (Tarifverbund A-Welle)

Passengers
- 2018: 690 per weekday

Services
Preceding station	Aargau S-Bahn	Following station
Othmarsingen towards Langenthal	S23	Lupfig towards Baden
Othmarsingen towards Muri AG	S25	Lupfig towards Brugg AG
Preceding station	Zurich S-Bahn	Following station
Othmarsingen towards Aarau	SN1 Limited service	Lupfig towards Winterthur
Location

Birr railway station (German: Bahnhof Birr) is a railway station in the municipality of Birr, in the Swiss canton of Aargau. It is an intermediate stop on the standard gauge Brugg–Hendschiken line of Swiss Federal Railways.

== Services ==
As of the December 2023 timetable change, the following services stop at Birr:

- Aargau S-Bahn:
  - S23: hourly service between Langenthal and Baden.
  - S25: hourly service between Muri AG and Brugg AG.
- Zürich S-Bahn SN1: on Friday and Saturday night, hourly service between Aarau and Winterthur via Zürich Stadelhofen.
