= Othmarsingen =

- Municipality
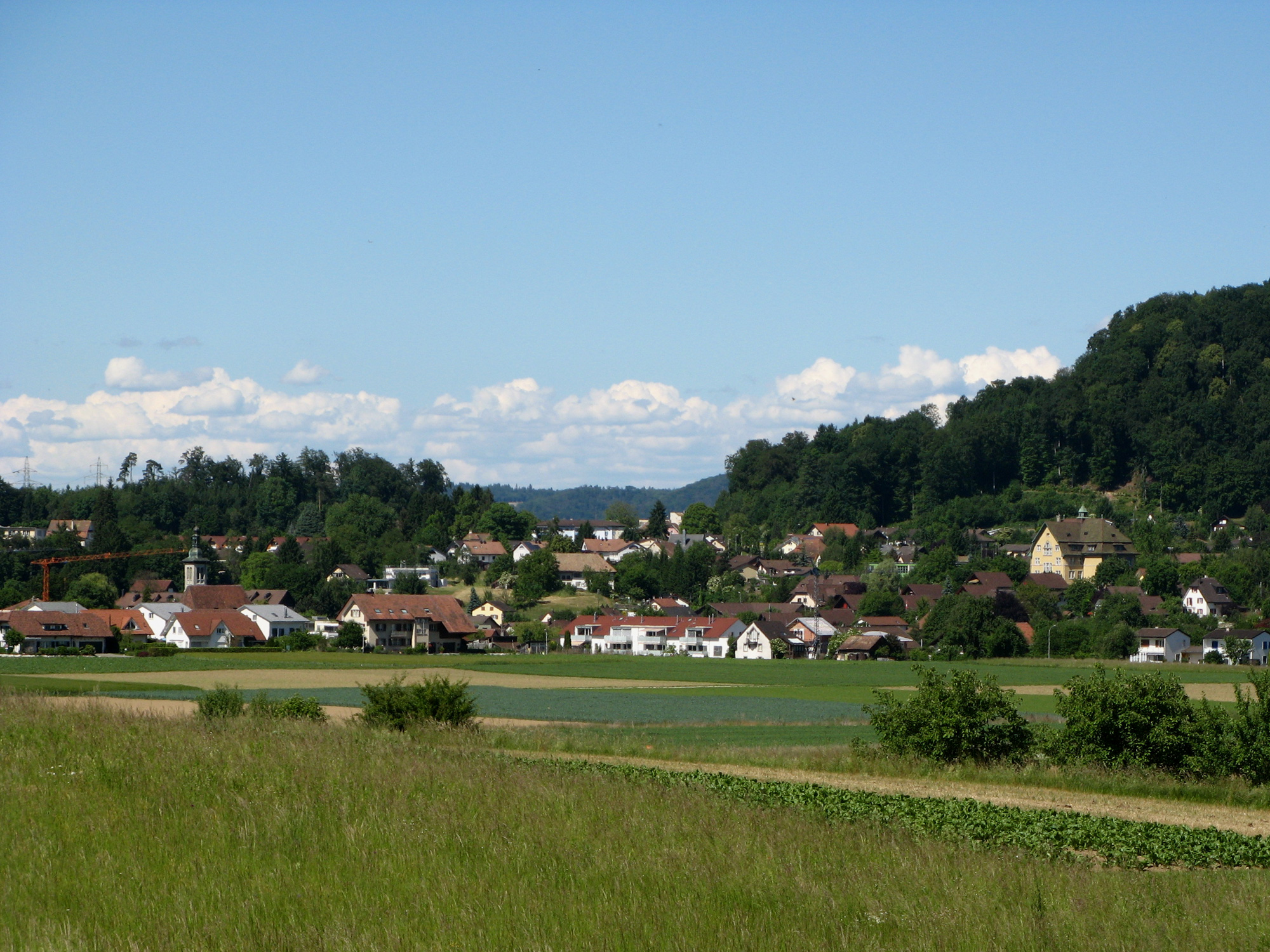

- Flag Coat of arms
- Location of Othmarsingen
- Location within Switzerland Location within Canton of Aargau
- Coordinates: 47°24′N 8°13′E
- Country: Switzerland
- Canton: Aargau
- District: Lenzburg

Area
  - Total: 4.73 km^{2} (1.83 sq mi)
- Elevation: 397 m (1,302 ft)

Population (December 2006)
  - Total: 2,233
  - Density: 472/km^{2} (1,220/sq mi)
- Time zone: UTC+01:00 (CET)
  - Summer (DST): UTC+02:00 (CEST)
- Postal code: 5504
- SFOS number: 4205
- ISO 3166 code: CH-AG
- Surrounded by: Brunegg, Dottikon, Hägglingen, Hendschiken, Lenzburg, Mägenwil, Möriken-Wildegg
- Website: www.othmarsingen.ch

Othmarsingen is a municipality in the district of Lenzburg in the canton of Aargau in Switzerland.

== History ==
Aerial view (1954)

Mesolithic siliceous rock objects and tools and Hallstatt era graves indicate that the Othmarsingen area was prehistorically occupied. Othmarsingen is first mentioned around 1184-90 as Otewizzingin. The modern municipality was formed from the village of Othmarsingen, part of the settlement along the north-west road and the village of Hüttwilen (which was last mentioned as an independent village in 1504). In the Middle Ages the high court right was held by the Habsburgs, and after 1415 it was held by Bern. The lower court right belonged to various aristocratic families until 1484 when it went to Bern. The court that constituted Othmarsingen also included, Ammerswil, Dintikon and Brunegg in 1539 and was under a bailiff. During the Peasants War of 1653 Othmarsingen was heavily damaged. The village laws date from 1680 and 1734. In 1594 a teacher was active in the village and since 1657 there has been a private school.

The southern part of the village was in the Ammerswil parish while the northern part was in the Staufberg parish. In 1528, the Protestant Reformation spread into Othmarsingen from Bern. A chapel is mentioned in 1371 and 1421 with Saint Mary as the patron. In 1593 this chapel was moved. In 1675 a new church was built, and in 1873 it became its own parish.

There was a cotton processing factory in the village starting in 1760. Until World War I there was, also, a straw products factory. Othmarsingen has always has a good transport connection. In 1770, the expansion of the Zurich-Bern road came through the village. In 1877, the National Railway came through and in 1882 it was connected to the Aargau Southern Railway. In 1975, the Heitersberg railway line was added.

== Geography ==
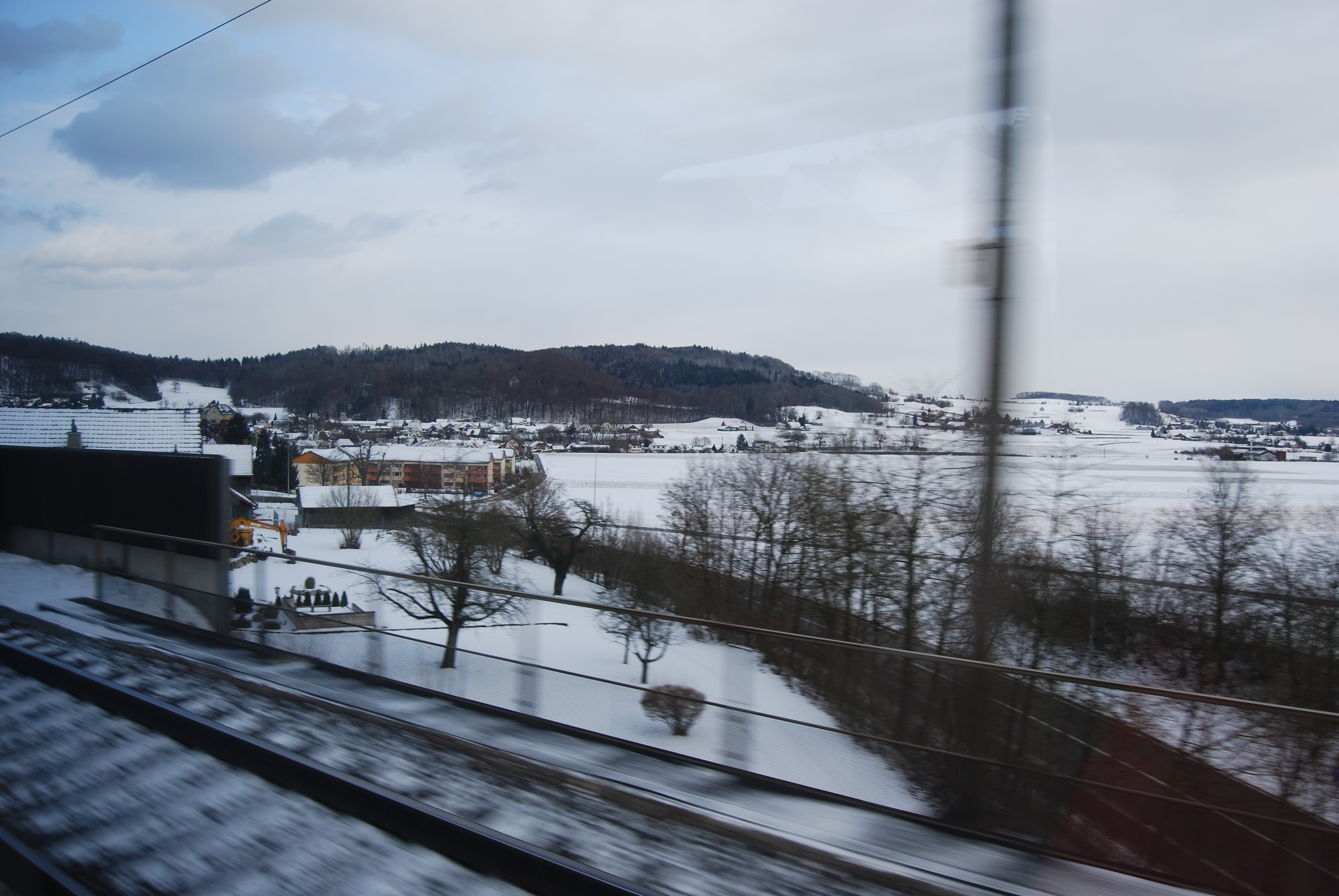
Othmarsingen from train

Othmarsingen has an area, as of 2009, of 4.73 square kilometers (1.83 sq mi). Of this area, 1.63 km^{2} (0.63 sq mi) or 34.5% is used for agricultural purposes, while 1.92 km^{2} (0.74 sq mi) or 40.6% is forested. Of the rest of the land, 1.15 km^{2} (0.44 sq mi) or 24.3% is settled (buildings or roads), 0.02 km^{2} (4.9 acres) or 0.4% is either rivers or lakes.

Of the built up area, industrial buildings made up 3.6% of the total area while housing and buildings made up 10.6% and transportation infrastructure made up 9.3%. Out of the forested land, all of the forested land area is covered with heavy forests. Of the agricultural land, 27.7% is used for growing crops and 6.1% is pastures. All the water in the municipality is in rivers and streams.

The municipality is located in the Lenzburg district, near the Bünz river. It consists of the linear village of Othmarsingen.

== Coat of arms ==
The blazon of the municipal coat of arms is Azure a Church Argent roofed Gules on a Bridge masoned.

== Demographics ==
Othmarsingen has a population (as of December 2020) of 3,037. As of June 2009, 23.3% of the population are foreign nationals. Over the last 10 years (1997–2007) the population has changed at a rate of 4.5%. Most of the population (as of 2000) speaks German (87.2%), with Italian being second most common ( 2.2%) and Turkish being third ( 2.1%).

The age distribution, as of 2008, in Othmarsingen is; 220 children or 9.4% of the population are between 0 and 9 years old and 334 teenagers or 14.3% are between 10 and 19. Of the adult population, 282 people or 12.1% of the population are between 20 and 29 years old. 305 people or 13.1% are between 30 and 39, 408 people or 17.5% are between 40 and 49, and 344 people or 14.7% are between 50 and 59. The senior population distribution is 214 people or 9.2% of the population are between 60 and 69 years old, 122 people or 5.2% are between 70 and 79, there are 91 people or 3.9% who are between 80 and 89, and there are 15 people or 0.6% who are 90 and older.

As of 2000 the average number of residents per living room was 0.59 which is about equal to the cantonal average of 0.57 per room. In this case, a room is defined as space of a housing unit of at least 4 m^{2} (43 sq ft) as normal bedrooms, dining rooms, living rooms, kitchens and habitable cellars and attics. About 51.6% of the total households were owner occupied, or in other words did not pay rent (though they may have a mortgage or a rent-to-own agreement).

As of 2000, there were 59 homes with 1 or 2 persons in the household, 464 homes with 3 or 4 persons in the household, and 308 homes with 5 or more persons in the household. As of 2000, there were 840 private households (homes and apartments) in the municipality, and an average of 2.5 persons per household. In 2008 there were 402 single family homes (or 39.7% of the total) out of a total of 1,012 homes and apartments. There were a total of 25 empty apartments for a 2.5% vacancy rate. As of 2007, the construction rate of new housing units was 10.4 new units per 1000 residents.

In the 2007 federal election the most popular party was the SVP which received 44.8% of the vote. The next three most popular parties were the SP (16.5%), the FDP (10.9%) and the CVP (8.5%).

The historical population is given in the following table:

Historical population
Year	Pop.	±%
1764	531	—
1850	1,134	+113.6%
1900	903	−20.4%
1950	1,173	+29.9%
2000	2,117	+80.5%

== Heritage sites of national significance ==
The village Reformed church is listed as a Swiss heritage site of national significance.

== Economy ==
As of 2007, Othmarsingen had an unemployment rate of 2.5%. As of 2005, there were 23 people employed in the primary economic sector and about 10 businesses involved in this sector. 208 people are employed in the secondary sector and there are 22 businesses in this sector. 508 people are employed in the tertiary sector, with 66 businesses in this sector.

In 2000 there were 1,096 workers who lived in the municipality. Of these, 855 or about 78.0% of the residents worked outside Othmarsingen while 510 people commuted into the municipality for work. There were a total of 751 jobs (of at least 6 hours per week) in the municipality. Of the working population, 12.4% used public transportation to get to work, and 58.1% used a private car.

== Religion ==
From the 2000 census, 673 or 31.8% were Roman Catholic, while 967 or 45.7% belonged to the Swiss Reformed Church. Of the rest of the population, there were 2 individuals (or about 0.09% of the population) who belonged to the Christian Catholic faith.

== Education ==
In Othmarsingen about 72.1% of the population (between age 25-64) have completed either non-mandatory upper secondary education or additional higher education (either university or a Fachhochschule). Of the school age population (in the 2008/2009 school year), there are 179 students attending primary school, there are 149 students attending secondary school in the municipality. Othmarsingen is home to the Schul-u.Gde.Bibliothek Othmarsingen (school and municipal library of Othmarsingen). The library has (as of 2008) 5,803 books or other media, and loaned out 3,275 items in the same year. It was open a total of 90 days with average of 2 hours per week during that year.

== Transportation ==
As of December 2024, Othmarsingen railway station is a stop of Zurich S-Bahn services S11 and S42. It is also served by lines S23 and S25 of Aargau S-Bahn. The station is also served by regional buses.
