= Hendschiken railway station =

Railway station in Switzerland

Hendschiken
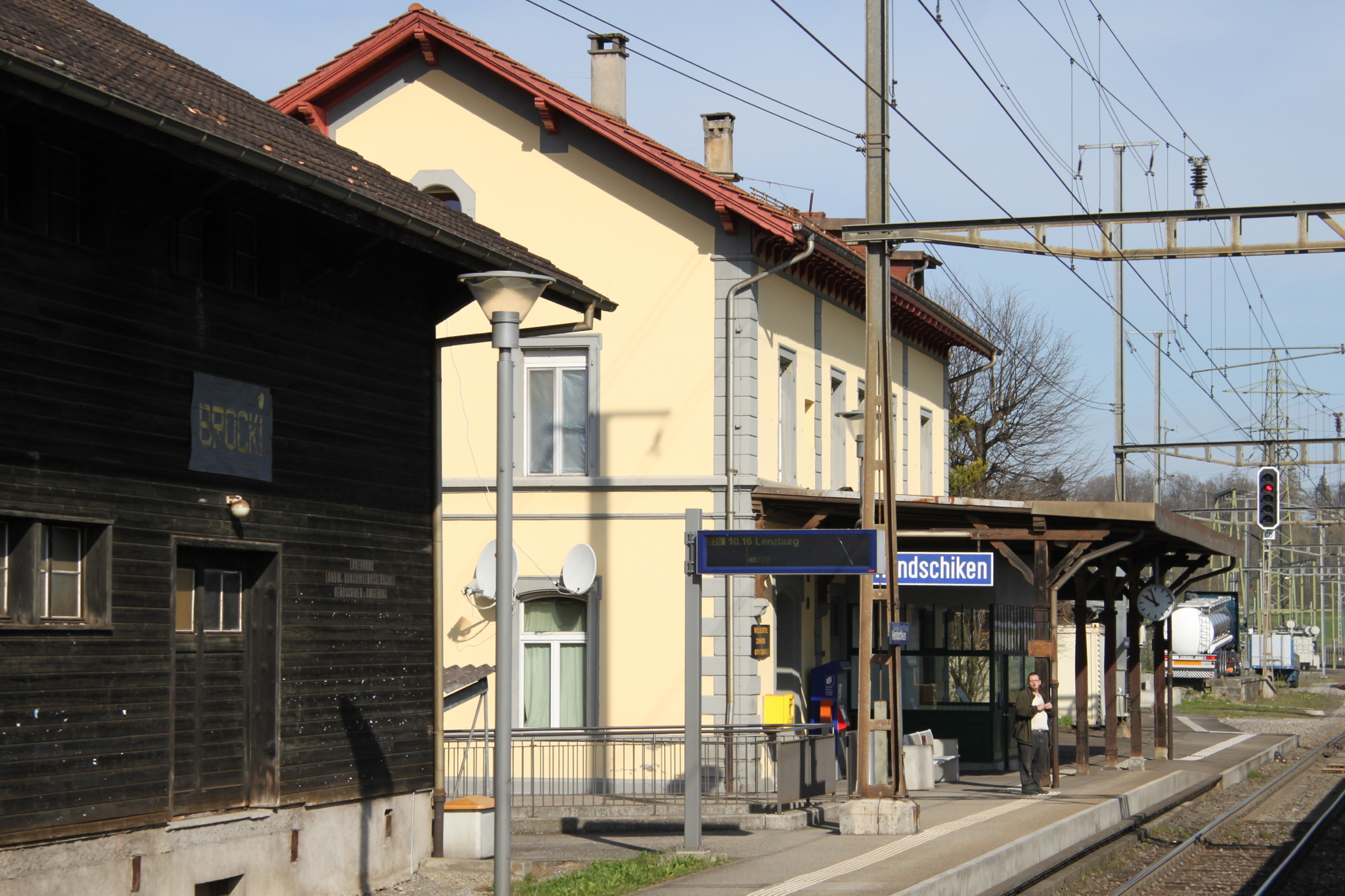
- The station building in 2015

General information
- Location: Hendschiken; Switzerland
- Coordinates: 47°23′N 8°13′E
- Owner: Swiss Federal Railways
- Lines: Brugg–Hendschiken line; Rupperswil–Immensee line
- Distance: 11.1 km (6.9 mi) from Brugg AG; 65.2 km (40.5 mi) from Basel SBB
- Train operators: Swiss Federal Railways

Passengers
- 2018: 890 per weekday

Services
Preceding station	Zurich S-Bahn	Following station
Othmarsingen towards Zürich Hauptbahnhof	S42	Dottikon-Dintikon towards Muri AG
Preceding station	Aargau S-Bahn	Following station
Othmarsingen towards Brugg AG	S25	Dottikon-Dintikon towards Muri AG
Lenzburg towards Olten	S26	Dottikon-Dintikon towards Rotkreuz
Location
- Location within Switzerland Location within Canton of Aargau

Hendschiken railway station (German: Bahnhof Hendschiken) is a railway station in the municipality of Hendschiken, in the Swiss canton of Aargau. It is located at the junction of the standard gauge Brugg–Hendschiken and Rupperswil–Immensee lines of Swiss Federal Railways.

== Services ==
The following services stop at Hendschiken:

- Zürich S-Bahn S42: rush-hour service between Muri AG and Zürich Hauptbahnhof.
- Aargau S-Bahn:
  - S25: hourly service between Muri AG and Brugg AG.
  - S26: half-hourly service between Lenzburg and Rotkreuz, with every other train continuing from Lenzburg to Olten.
