= Oberrüti railway station =

Railway station in Oberrüti, Switzerland

Oberrüti
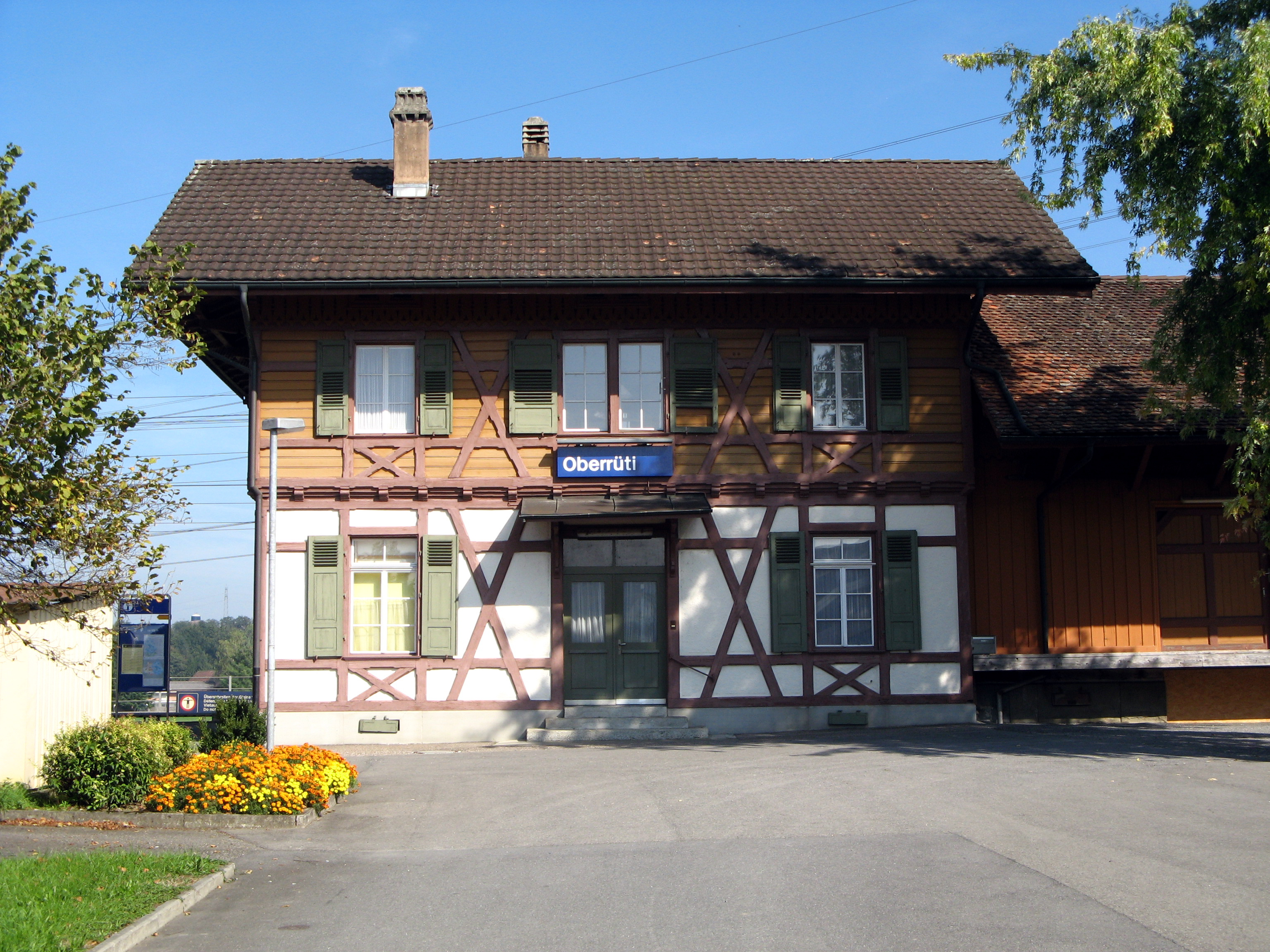
- The station building in 2013

General information
- Location: Oberrüti; Switzerland
- Coordinates: 47°10′N 8°24′E
- Owner: Swiss Federal Railways
- Line: Rupperswil–Immensee line
- Distance: 95.2 km (59.2 mi) from Basel SBB
- Train operators: Swiss Federal Railways
- Connections: Zugerland Verkehrsbetriebe buses

Passengers
- 2018: 400 per weekday

Services
Preceding station	Aargau S-Bahn	Following station
Sins towards Olten	S26	Rotkreuz Terminus
Location
- Location within Switzerland Location within Canton of Aargau

Oberrüti railway station (German: Bahnhof Oberrüti) is a railway station in the municipality of Oberrüti, in the Swiss canton of Aargau. It is an intermediate stop on the standard gauge Rupperswil–Immensee line of Swiss Federal Railways.

== Services ==
The following services stop at Oberrüti:

- Aargau S-Bahn S26: half-hourly service between Lenzburg and Rotkreuz, with every other train continuing from Lenzburg to Olten.
