= Mühlau railway station =

Railway station in Switzerland

Mühlau
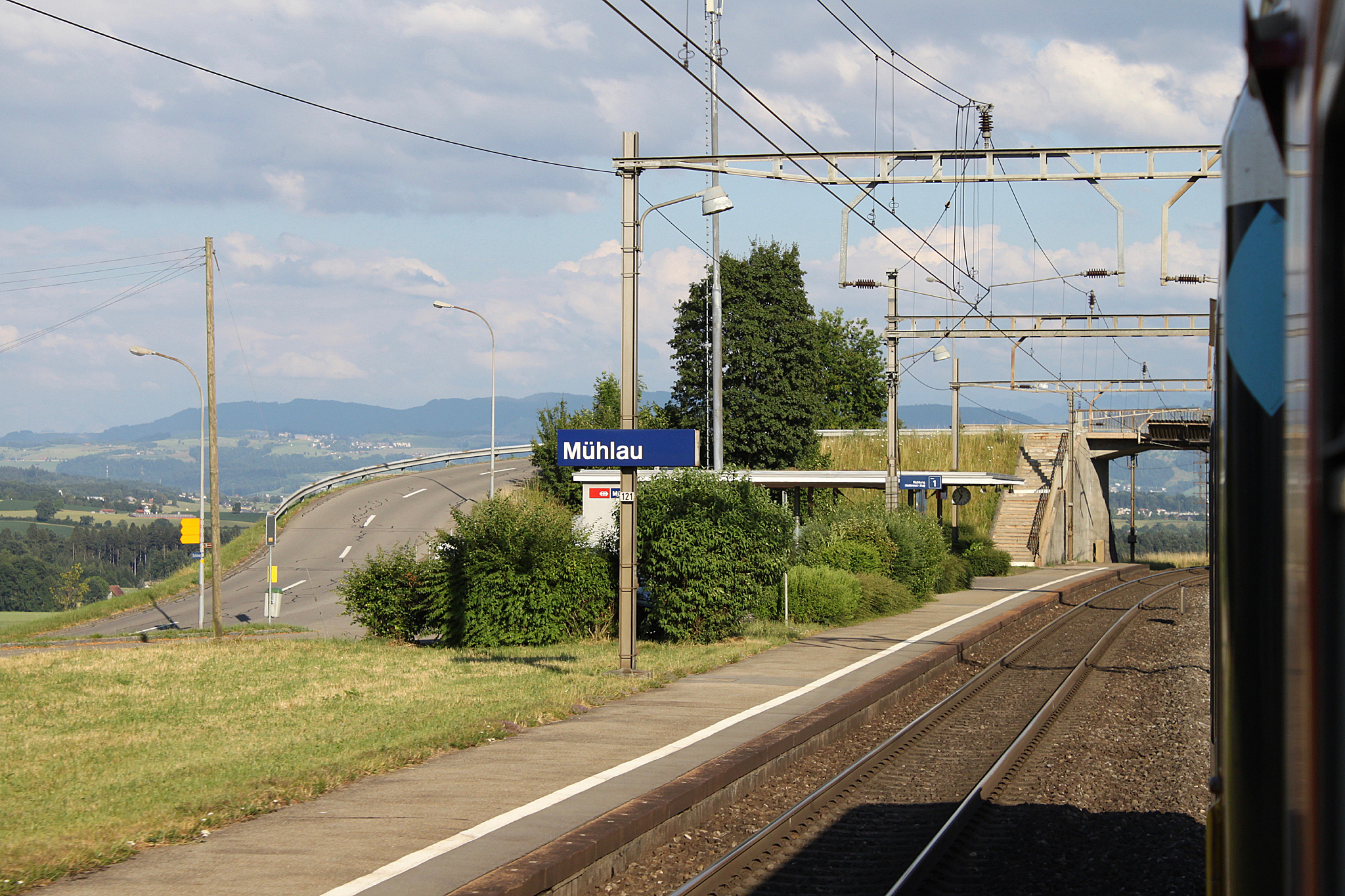
- The station platform in 2017

General information
- Location: Mühlau; Switzerland
- Coordinates: 47°14′N 8°23′E
- Owner: Swiss Federal Railways
- Line: Rupperswil–Immensee line
- Distance: 88.5 km (55.0 mi) from Basel SBB
- Train operators: Swiss Federal Railways

Passengers
- 2018: 230 per weekday

Services
Preceding station	Aargau S-Bahn	Following station
Benzenschwil towards Olten	S26	Sins towards Rotkreuz
Location
- Location within Switzerland Location within Canton of Aargau

Mühlau railway station (German: Bahnhof Mühlau) is a railway station in the municipality of Mühlau, in the Swiss canton of Aargau. It is an intermediate stop on the standard gauge Rupperswil–Immensee line of Swiss Federal Railways.

== Services ==
The following services stop at Mühlau:

- Aargau S-Bahn S26: half-hourly service between Lenzburg and Rotkreuz, with every other train continuing from Lenzburg to Olten.
