= Sins railway station =

Railway station in Sins, Switzerland

Sins
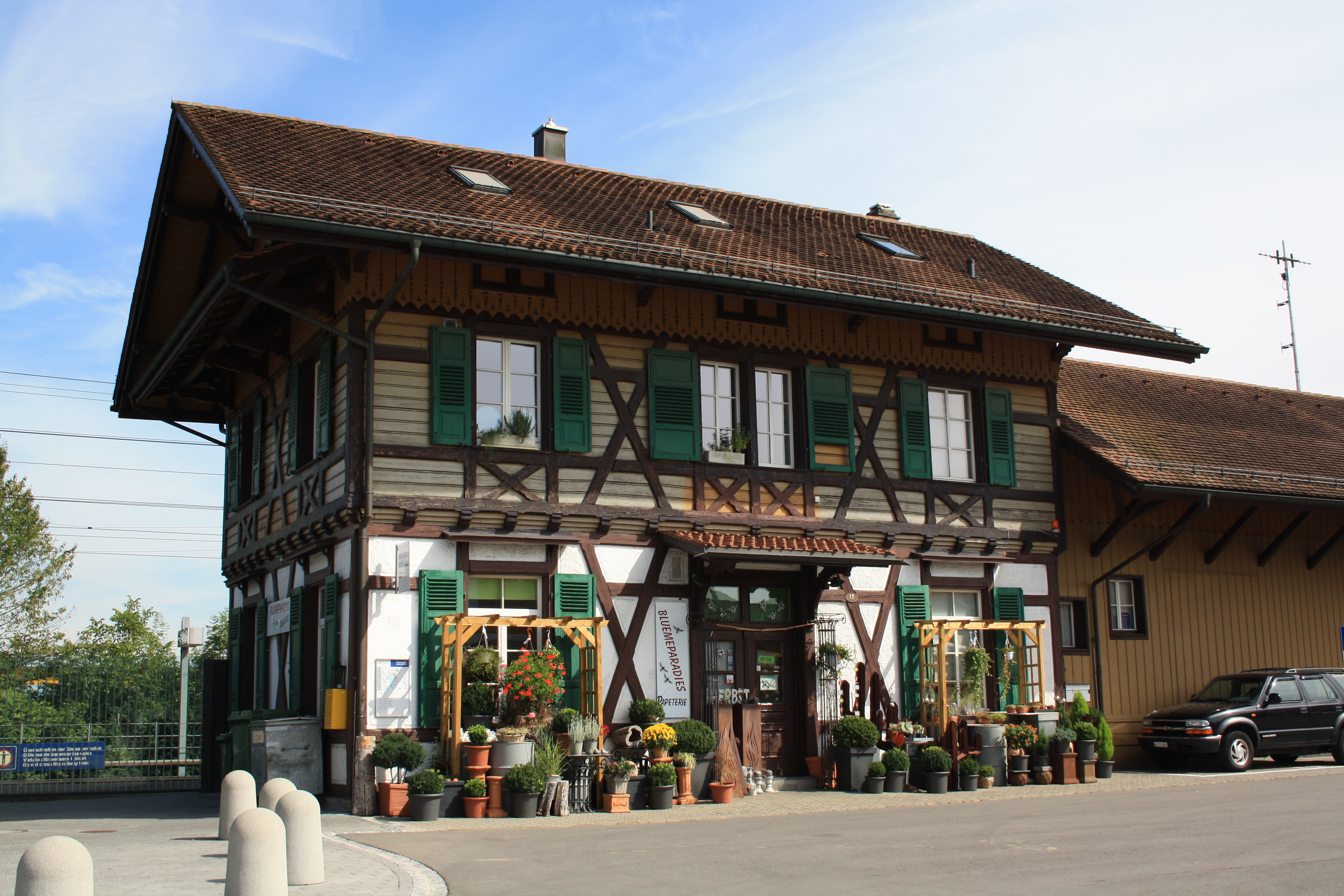
- The station building in 2010

General information
- Location: Sins; Switzerland
- Coordinates: 47°11′N 8°24′E
- Owner: Swiss Federal Railways
- Line: Rupperswil–Immensee line
- Distance: 92.7 km (57.6 mi) from Basel SBB
- Train operators: Swiss Federal Railways
- Connections: Zugerland Verkehrsbetriebe buses

Passengers
- 2018: 1,400 per weekday

Services
Preceding station	Aargau S-Bahn	Following station
Mühlau towards Olten	S26	Oberrüti towards Rotkreuz
Location
- Location within Switzerland Location within Canton of Aargau

Sins railway station (German: Bahnhof Sins) is a railway station in the municipality of Sins, in the Swiss canton of Aargau. It is an intermediate stop on the standard gauge Rupperswil–Immensee line of Swiss Federal Railways.

== Services ==
The following services stop at Sins:

- Aargau S-Bahn S26: half-hourly service between Lenzburg and Rotkreuz, with every other train continuing from Lenzburg to Olten.
