= Mellingen Heitersberg railway station =

Railway station in Mellingen, Switzerland

Mellingen Heitersberg
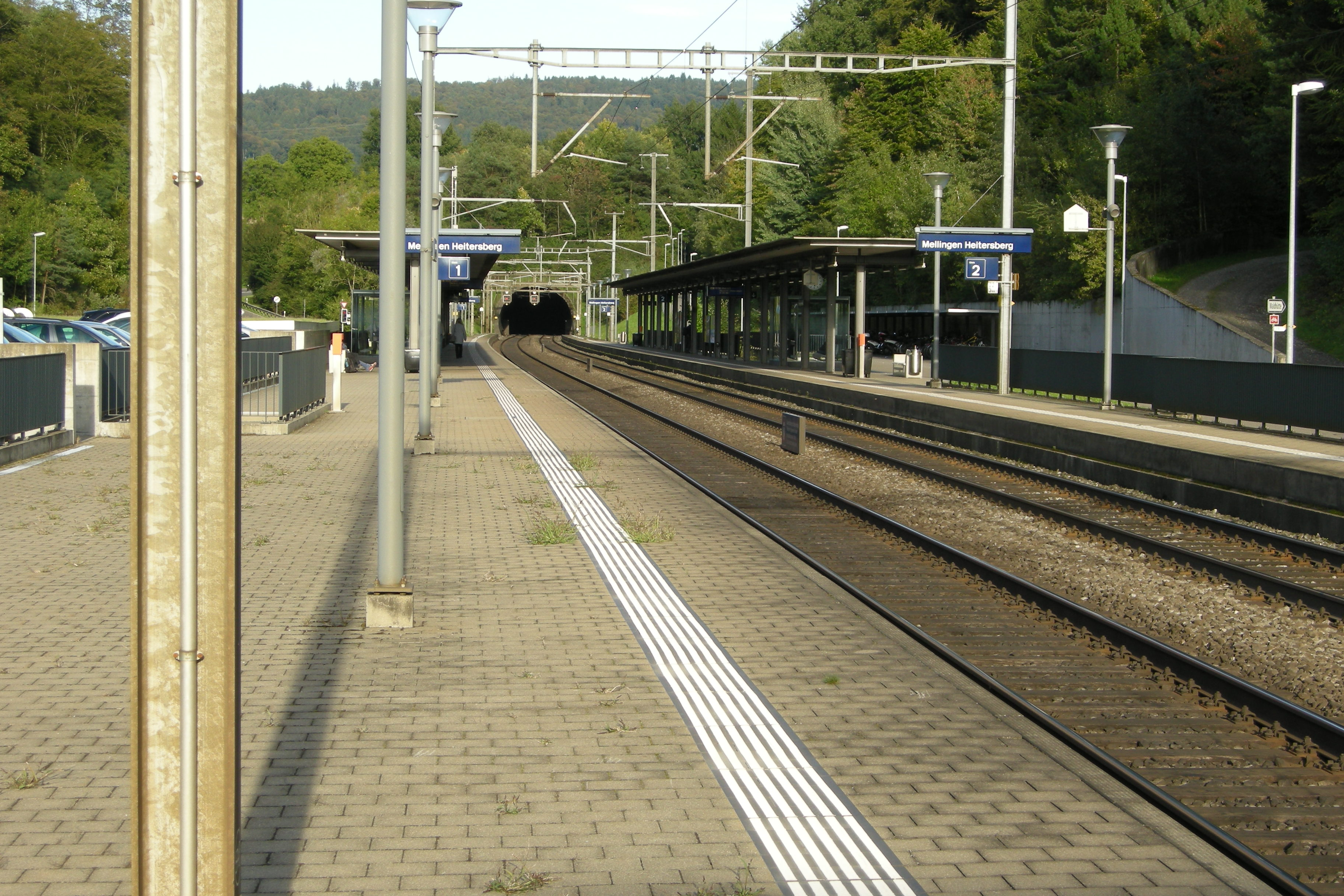
- On the platform in 2017, looking toward the Heitersberg Tunnel

General information
- Location: Mellingen, Aargau; Switzerland
- Coordinates: 47°25′40″N 8°16′32″E
- Owner: Swiss Federal Railways
- Line: Heitersberg line
- Train operators: Swiss Federal Railways
- Connections: PostAuto Schweiz

Other information
- Fare zone: 571 (Tarifverbund A-Welle)

Services
Preceding station	Zurich S-Bahn	Following station
Mägenwil towards Aarau	S11	Killwangen-Spreitenbach towards Seuzach or Wila
Mägenwil towards Olten	SN11 Limited service	Killwangen-Spreitenbach towards Winterthur
Location
- Location within Switzerland Location within Canton of Aargau

Mellingen Heitersberg railway station (German: Bahnhof Mellingen Heitersberg) is a railway station in the municipality of Mellingen in the Swiss canton of Aargau.

The station is located on the Heitersberg line, part of the Zurich to Olten main line, just west of the western portal to the Heitersberg Tunnel.

== Services ==
As of the December 2024 timetable change, the following services stop at Mellingen Heitersberg:

- Zurich S-Bahn S11: half-hourly service between Aarau and Winterthur; hourly service to Seuzach or Sennhof-Kyburg; rush-hour service to Wila.

During weekends, there is a nighttime S-Bahn service (SN11) calling at the station, offered by ZVV:

- Zurich S-Bahn SN11: hourly service between Winterthur and Olten, via Zürich HB.

== See also ==
- Rail transport in Switzerland
