= Benzenschwil railway station =

Railway station in Switzerland

Benzenschwil
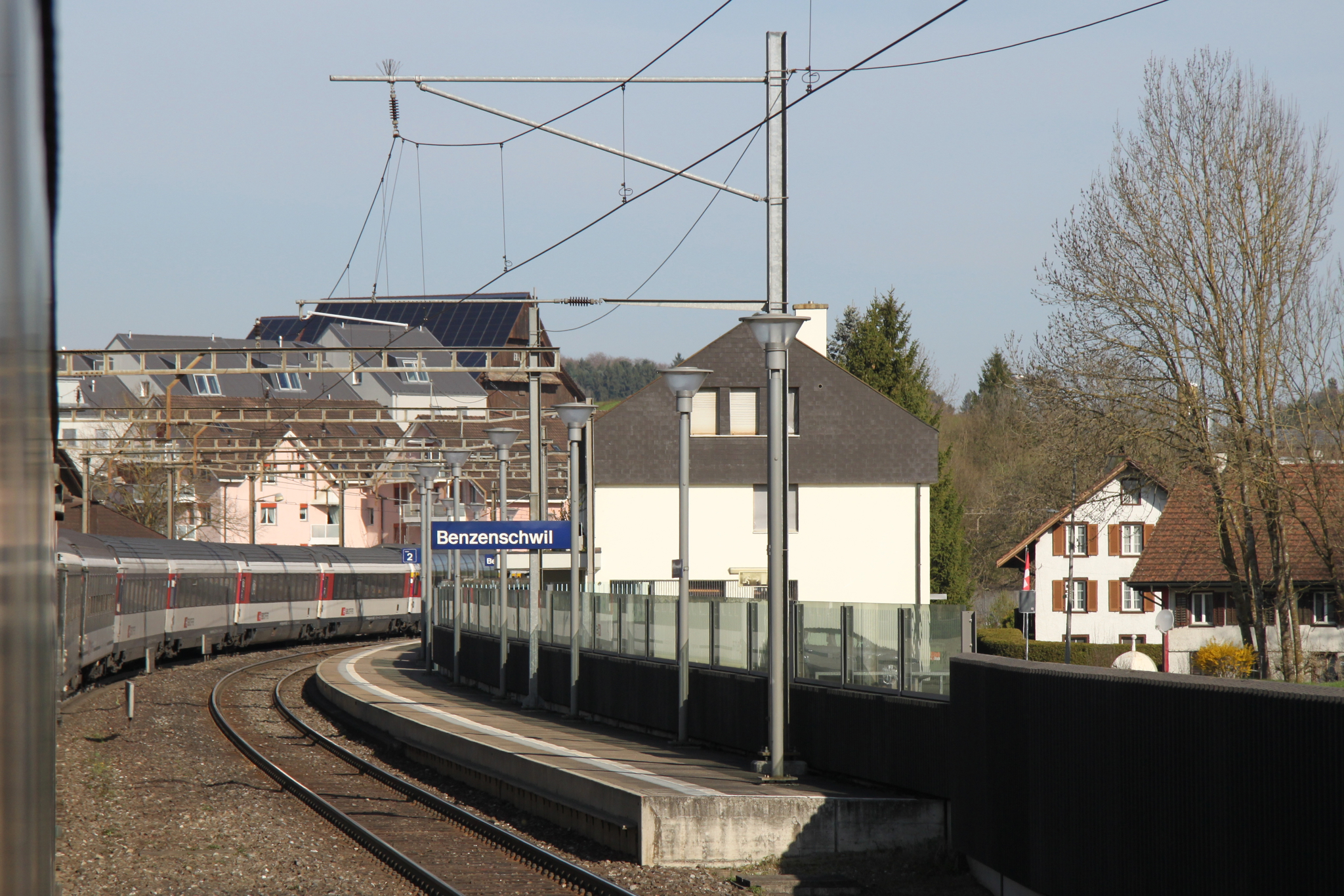
- The station in 2015

General information
- Location: Merenschwand; Switzerland
- Coordinates: 47°15′N 8°22′E
- Owner: Swiss Federal Railways
- Line: Rupperswil–Immensee line
- Distance: 85.4 km (53.1 mi) from Basel SBB
- Train operators: Swiss Federal Railways
- Connections: PostAuto Schweiz buses

Passengers
- 2018: 220 per weekday

Services
Preceding station	Aargau S-Bahn	Following station
Muri AG towards Olten	S26	Mühlau towards Rotkreuz
Location
- Location within Switzerland Location within Canton of Aargau

Benzenschwil railway station (German: Bahnhof Benzenschwil) is a railway station in the municipality of Merenschwand, in the Swiss canton of Aargau. It is an intermediate stop on the standard gauge Rupperswil–Immensee line of Swiss Federal Railways.

== Services ==
The following services stop at Benzenschwil:

- Aargau S-Bahn S26: half-hourly service between Lenzburg and Rotkreuz, with every other train continuing from Lenzburg to Olten.
