= Mägenwil railway station =

Railway station in Mägenwil, Switzerland

Mägenwil
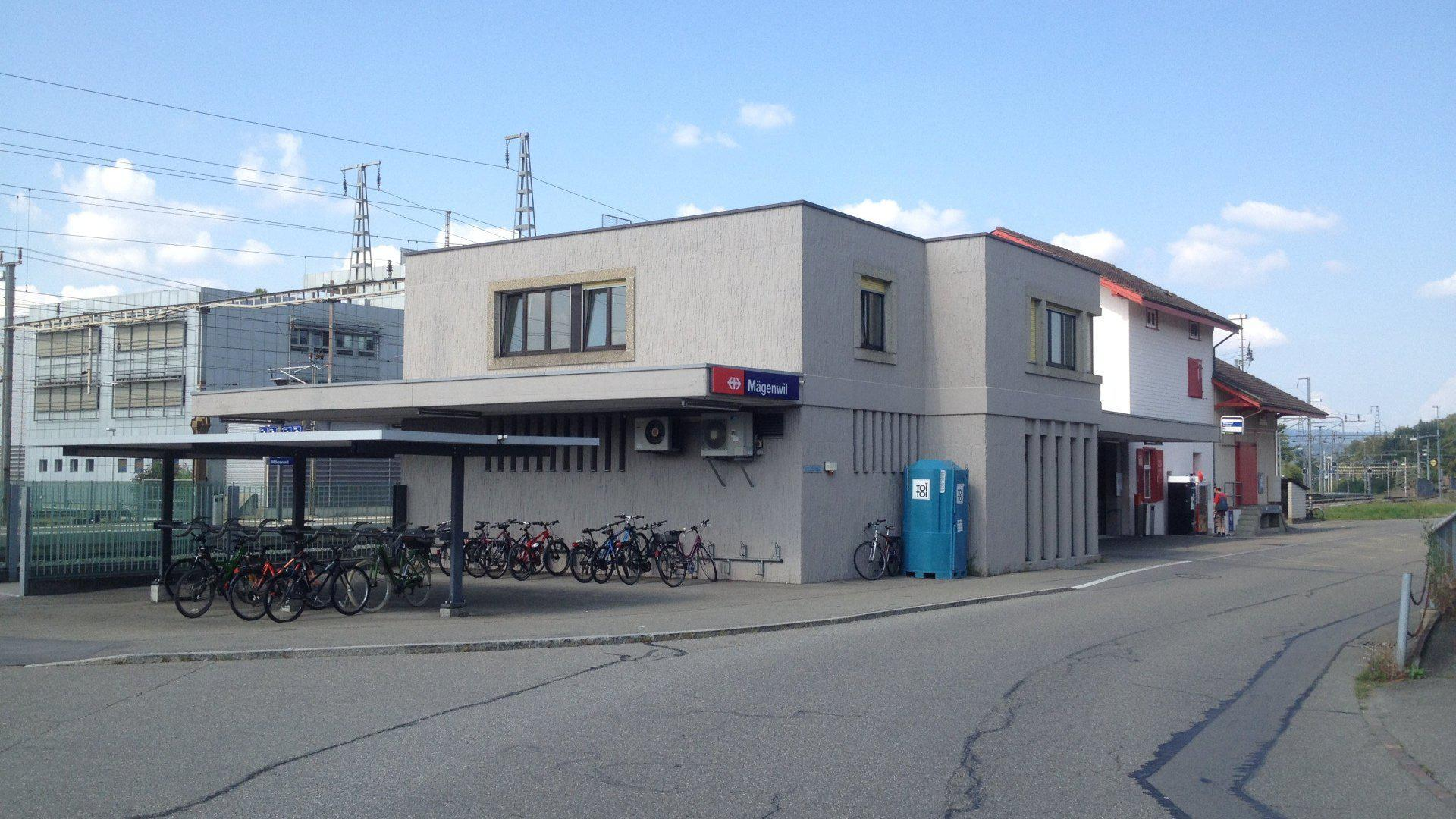
- The station building in 2018

General information
- Location: Bahnhofstrasse; Mägenwil, Aargau; Switzerland
- Coordinates: 47°24′52″N 8°14′06″E
- Elevation: 416 m (1,365 ft)
- Owner: Swiss Federal Railways
- Line: Heitersberg line
- Train operators: Swiss Federal Railways
- Connections: Regionalbus Lenzburg AG

Other information
- Fare zone: 551 (Tarifverbund A-Welle)

Services
Preceding station	Zurich S-Bahn	Following station
Othmarsingen towards Aarau	S11	Mellingen Heitersberg towards Seuzach or Wila
Othmarsingen towards Olten	SN11 Limited service	Mellingen Heitersberg towards Winterthur
Location
- Location within Switzerland Location within Canton of Aargau

Mägenwil is a railway station in the municipality of Mägenwil in the Swiss canton of Aargau. The station is located on the Heitersberg line. The station was rebuilt in 2019–2023 to permit the construction of a new connecting track between the Heitersberg line and the Brugg–Hendschiken railway line.

== Services ==
As of the December 2023 timetable change, the following services stop at Mägenwil:

- Zurich S-Bahn S11: half-hourly service between Aarau and Winterthur; hourly service to Seuzach or Sennhof-Kyburg; rush-hour service to Wila.

During weekends, there is a nighttime S-Bahn service (SN11) calling at the station, offered by ZVV:

- Zurich S-Bahn SN11: hourly service between Winterthur and Olten, via Zürich HB.

== See also ==
- Rail transport in Switzerland
