= Brugg–Hendschiken railway line =

Railway line in canton of Aargau, Switzerland

Brugg–Hendschiken

Overview
- Owner: Swiss Federal Railways
- Line number: 652
- Locale: Aargau
- Termini: Brugg AG; Hendschiken
- Stations: 5

Service
- Services: Aargau S-Bahn S23 S25

History
- Opened: 1 June 1882

Technical
- Line length: 11.1 km (6.9 mi)
- Number of tracks: 2
- Track gauge: 1,435 mm (4 ft 8 1/2 in) standard gauge
- Electrification: 15 kV 16.7 Hz AC

The Brugg–Hendschiken railway line is a standard gauge railway line located in the canton of Aargau, in Switzerland. It runs 11.1 kilometres (6.9 mi) from Brugg AG to Hendschiken. The line runs north-south and interchanges with several other lines, including the Rupperswil–Immensee, Heitersberg / Zofingen–Wettingen, Baden–Aarau, and Bözberg. The Aargau Southern Railway opened the line in 1882 and it has belonged to Swiss Federal Railways since 1902.

== History ==
The Aargau Southern Railway completed the line on 1 June 1882. It was the final line built by that company. The line passed to Swiss Federal Railways in 1902 after the Aargau Southern Railway, along with its corporate parents the Swiss Central Railway and Swiss Northeastern Railway, were nationalized. SBB electrified the line at 15 kV 16.7 Hz AC in 1927, completing the work on 5 May. Double-tracking came in stages: in the area around Brugg (1969), between Othmarsingen and Hendschiken (1975), and finally between Othmarsingen and Brugg in 1994. In December 2023 a new connecting track was completed between Birr and the Heitersberg line, enabling direct access to Mägenwil. This line will be used by freight traffic and enable more frequent service on the S11 between Mägenwil and Aarau.

== Route ==
The line begins at Brugg AG, where it connects with the Baden–Aarau, and Bözberg lines. It runs south to Othmarsingen and a junction with the Heitersberg and Zofingen–Wettingen lines. At Hendschiken it joins with another former Aargau Southern line, the Rupperswil–Immensee.

== Operation ==
The primary passenger service on the line comes from the Aargau S-Bahn S25, which runs hourly between Muri AG and Brugg AG. This is supplemented by the S23, which runs hourly between Langenthal and Baden. The S23 uses the line between Othmarsingen and Brugg, combining with the S25 for half-hourly service between those stations. In addition, the rush-hour S42 of the Zürich S-Bahn, which operates between Muri AG and Zürich Hauptbahnhof, uses the line between Hendschiken and Othmarsingen.
