= Rupperswil–Immensee railway line =

Railway line in Switzerland

Rupperswil–Immensee
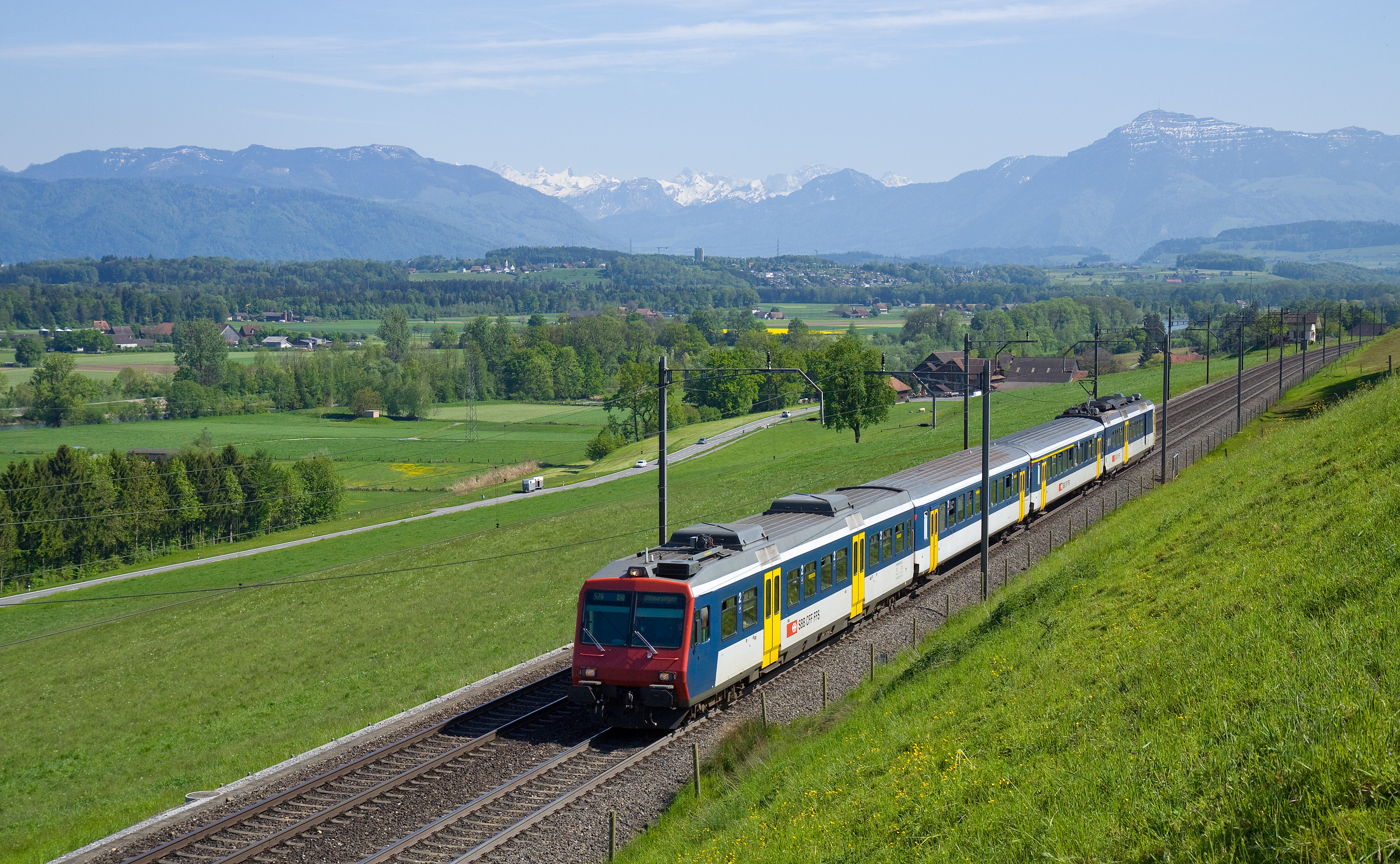
- A local train on the line in 2009, between Sins and Mühlau

Overview
- Owner: Swiss Federal Railways
- Line number: 653
- Locale: Aargau; Zug
- Termini: Rupperswil; Immensee
- Stations: 13

History
- Opened: 23 June 1874

Technical
- Line length: 48.7 km (30.3 mi)
- Number of tracks: 2
- Track gauge: 1,435 mm (4 ft 8 1/2 in) standard gauge
- Electrification: 15 kV 16.7 Hz AC

The Rupperswil–Immensee railway line is a railway line in the cantons of Aargau and Zug, in Switzerland. It runs 48.7 kilometres (30.3 mi) from Rupperswil to Immensee. The line runs north–south and interchanges with several other lines, including the Baden–Aarau, Heitersberg, Zofingen–Wettingen, Seetal, Brugg–Hendschiken, Bremgarten–Dietikon, Zug–Lucerne, and finally the Lucerne–Immensee and Gotthard at Immensee. The Aargau Southern Railway opened the line in stages between 1874 and 1882 and it has belonged to Swiss Federal Railways since 1902.

== History ==
The Aargau Southern Railway opened the first section of the line, between Rupperswil and Wohlen AG, on 23 June 1874. The line was extended south from Wohlen to Muri AG a year later, on 1 June 1875. The extension from Muri to Rotkreuz opened on 1 December 1881. The final extension, from Rotkreuz to Immensee, was completed on 1 June 1882. This latter extension was built in cooperation with the Gotthard Railway building north from Göschenen to Immensee.

The line passed to Swiss Federal Railways (SBB) in 1902 after the Aargau Southern Railway, along with its corporate parents the Swiss Central Railway and Swiss Northeastern Railway, were nationalized. SBB electrified the Rotkreuz–Immensee portion of line at 15 kV 16.7 Hz AC in 1922, completing the work on 6 July. The Rotkreuz–Rupperswil portion was electrified on 5 May 1927. The line was double-tracked in stages between 1930 and 1972.

== Route ==
The line begins at Rupperswil, where it connects with the Baden–Aarau line. It runs southeast to Lenzburg and a junction with the Heitersberg, Seetal, and Zofingen–Wettingen lines. It continues east to Hendschiken where another former Aargau Southern line, the Brugg–Hendschiken terminates. From Hendschiken the line runs north–south. At Wohlen AG there is an interchange with the 1,000 mm (3 ft 3 3/8 in) Bremgarten–Dietikon line, originally a standard gauge line of the Aargau Southern. Continuing from Wohlen, the line reaches Rotkreuz and a junction with the Zug–Lucerne line. From Rotkreuz, the line follows the left bank of Lake Zug to Immensee, where it terminates. Immensee is also the eastern terminus of the Lucerne–Immensee line and the northern terminus of the Gotthard line.

== Operations ==
No regular passenger service covers the entirety of the line. The primary passenger service on the line comes from the Aargau S-Bahn S26, which runs half-hourly between Rotkreuz and Lenzburg, and then hourly from Lenzburg to Olten. At the north end of the line, the Aargau S-Bahn S23 uses the line between Rupperswil and Lenzburg, while the S25 provides hourly service between Hendschiken and Muri. In addition, the rush-hour S42 of the Zürich S-Bahn, which operates between Muri and Zürich Hauptbahnhof, uses the line between Muri and Hendschiken.

Local passenger service between Rotkreuz and Immensee ended in 1996. Reconstruction of the Thalwil–Arth-Goldau line led to the temporary diversion of long-distance traffic over the Rotkreuz–Immensee section between 2019 and 2020. With the reopening of the Thalwil–Arth-Goldau line for the December 2020 timetable change, SBB, in cooperation with the Canton of Aargau, instituted a pair of weekend-only RegioExpress trains between Aarau and Arth-Goldau. Dubbed the Südbahn-Express (Southern Railway Express), the trains have connections to Ticino via either the traditional Gotthard line or the newer Gotthard Base Tunnel.
