= S42 (ZVV) =

Railway service in Switzerland

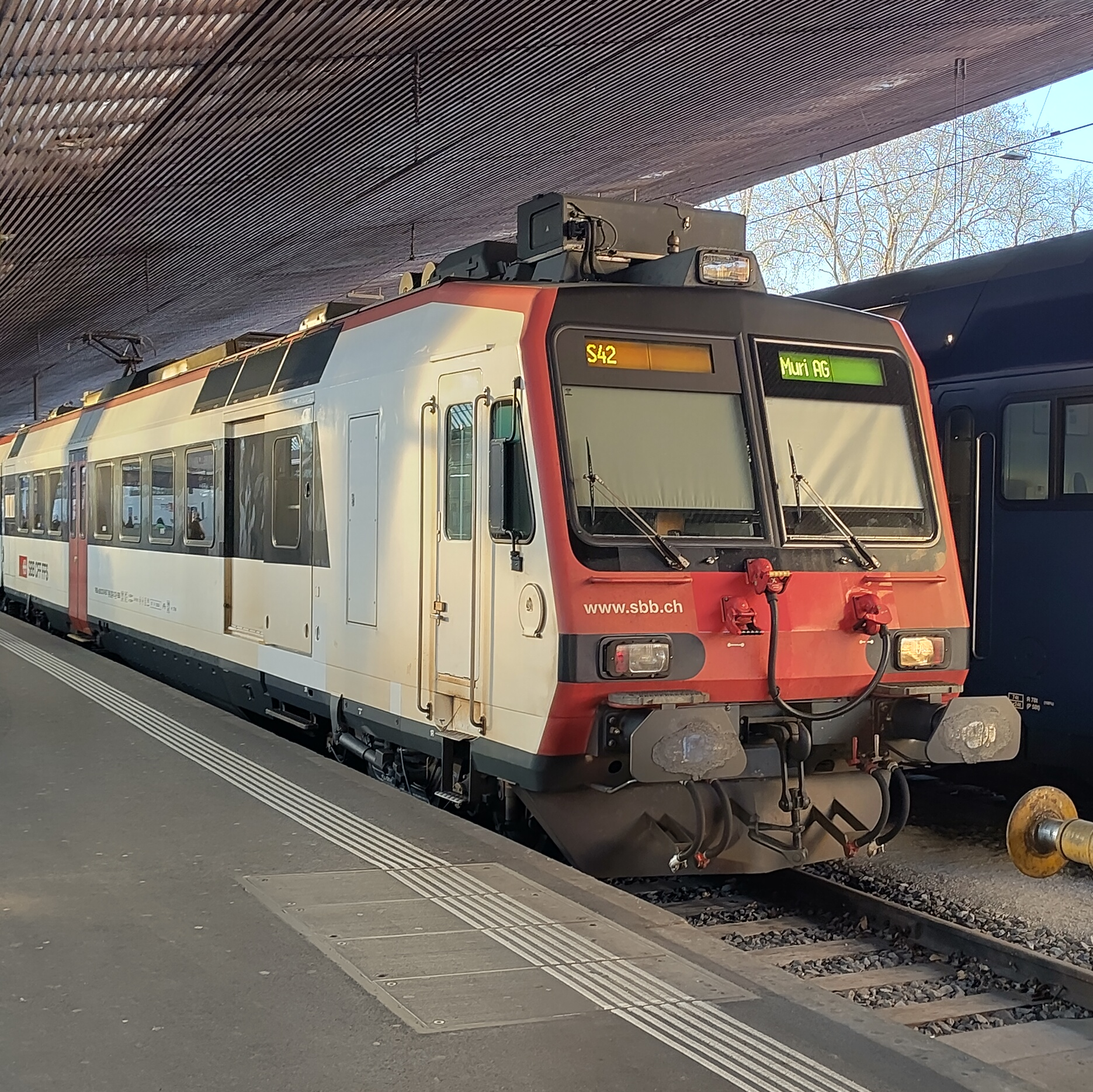
- S42 service waiting at Zürich Hauptbahnhof in March 2025

Overview
- Status: Operational
- Termini: Zürich HB; Muri AG
- Stations: 9
- Website: https://www.sbb.ch/en (in English)

Service
- Type: S-Bahn
- System: Zurich S-Bahn
- Operator(s): Swiss Federal Railways
- Rolling stock: Refurbished SBB RBDe 560 (NPZ/Domino) EMUs

Technical
- Track gauge: 1,435 mm (4 ft 8 1/2 in)

The S42 is a regional railway line of the Zurich S-Bahn that operates only during rush hour (Monday to Friday) between Zurich and Muri. At Zürich HB, trains of the S42 service usually depart from one of the surface level tracks (German: Gleis) 3–18.

== Route ==
- S42 Zürich HB–Othmarsingen–Muri AG

The service calls only at some stations between Zurich (canton of Zurich) and Othmarsingen (Aargau), but at all stations between Othmarsingen and Muri.

- Zürich Hauptbahnhof
- Zürich Altstetten
- Dietikon
- Othmarsingen
- Hendschiken
- Dottikon-Dintikon
- Wohlen
- Boswil-Bünzen
- Muri AG

== Scheduling ==
The S42 operates during peak-hours only: four trains from Muri AG to Zürich HB (and three trains in the opposite direction) in the morning, and four trains from Zürich HB to Muri AG (and three in the opposite direction) in the evenings. The journey between Zürich and Muri AG requires 48 minutes.

== Rolling stock ==
Services are operated by modernized SBB RBDe 560 (NPZ/Domino) trainsets.

== See also ==
- Rail transport in Switzerland
- Public transport in Zurich
- ZVV fare zones
- A-Welle tariff network (Aargau)
