= Baden–Aarau railway line =

Railway line in Switzerland

Overview
- Line number: 650
- Locale: Switzerland
- Termini: Baden; Aarau

Technical
- Line length: 26.82 km (16.67 mi)
- Number of tracks: 2
- Track gauge: 1,435 mm (4 ft 8 1/2 in)
- Electrification: 15 kV/16.7 Hz AC overhead catenary
- Maximum incline: 1.0%

The Baden–Aarau railway line is a railway line in the north of Switzerland. It runs from Baden via Turgi, Brugg AG and Wildegg to Aarau.

== Route ==
The line runs from Baden station on the west bank of the Limmat to Turgi station, crosses the Reuss on a stone bridge (the Windisch–Gebenstorf bridge, the second oldest railway bridge in Switzerland still in use) and continues for about 2 kilometres to the west along the Aare and then reaches Brugg AG railway station. The line then largely follows the course of the Aare to Aarau station. There are no large engineering structures apart from the Reuss Bridge.

In Turgi, a line branches off to Koblenz, running north through the lower Aare valley. In Brugg, the Bözberg railway line branches off to the northwest to Basel and the Brugg–Hendschiken railway line branches off to the south towards Arth-Goldau, the Gotthard and Italy.

In Wildegg, the Seetal Railway formerly branched off to the south towards Lenzburg, but operations on this part of the line were closed in 1984. The line connects with the Heitersberg line from Lenzburg in Rupperswil. The Aarau–Suhr railway of the former Swiss National Railway branched off shortly before Aarau; this was closed at the end of 2004 and was subsequently dismantled to enable the relocation of the Suhrental railway line.

== History ==
The first Swiss railway line, the Zürich–Baden railway (known as the Spanisch-Brötli-Bahn) was opened by the Swiss Northern Railway on 9 August 1847. It was planned to continue the line via Turgi, through the lower Aare valley to Koblenz and along the Rhine to Basel. However, this initially failed due to financial difficulties.

In 1850, a national council commission with the help of the English railway engineer Robert Stephenson recommended, among other things, that the connection between Zurich and Basel should not run via Koblenz, but instead via Olten. Therefore, the Swiss Northeastern Railway (Schweizerische Nordostbahn) planned the continuation from Baden along the Limmat to Turgi, then along the Aare to Aarau. The Baden–Brugg section was opened on 30 September 1856 and the extension to Aarau was opened on 15 May 1858.

The line was initially completely single-track, as was the Spanisch-Brötli-Bahn. Doubing of the Zürich–Turgi line was completed in 1861 and it was extended to Aarau in 1862. The electrification with the usual Swiss Federal Railway (SBB) system of 15 kV 16 2/3 Hz was completed on 21 January 1925. Until the nationalisation of the large private railway companies to form the SBB, the Northeastern Railway was responsible for the operation of the line.

For more than 100 years—until the opening of the Heitersberg line in 1975—this was the main east-west transversal of the Swiss railway network. However, the Bözberg railway line was opened in 1875, which allowed a shorter connection between Zurich and Basel than the Aarau–Olten–Hauenstein line. The originally planned line between Zürich and Basel via Koblenz was also built: it was opened between Turgi and Koblenz in 1859 and extended via Laufenburg to Basel in 1892.
