= Aargau Southern Railway =

Former railway company in Switzerland

- Industry: Rail transport
- Defunct: 1 January 1902
- Successor: Swiss Federal Railways

Aargau Southern Railway (German: Aargauische Südbahn) is a former railway company in Switzerland. Between 1873 and 1882, the Schweizerische Centralbahn (SCB) and the Schweizerische Nordostbahn (NOB) jointly built a connecting line to the Gotthardbahn. The line was operated by the SCB and ran from Rupperswil to Immensee. Branch lines ran from Wohlen to Bremgarten and from Hendschiken to Brugg.

== History ==
The routes were opened in this order:

- 23 June 1874: Rupperswil - Lenzburg - Hendschiken - Wohlen
- 1 June 1875: Wohlen - Muri
- 1 September 1876: Wohlen - Bremgarten West
- 1 December 1881: Muri - Immensee
- 1 June 1882: Hendschiken - Brugg

In 1902, the Aargauische Südbahn (together with the SCB and NOB) became part of the Swiss Federal Railways.
