= Heitersberg railway line =

Railway line in Switzerland

Overview
- Native name: Heitersbergstrecke
- Line number: 650, 650.1
- Locale: Switzerland
- Termini: Killwangen-Spreitenbach; Aarau

Technical
- Line length: 25.4 km (15.8 mi)
- Number of tracks: 2-4
- Track gauge: 1,435 mm (4 ft 8 1/2 in)
- Electrification: 15 kV/16.7 Hz AC overhead catenary

The Heitersberg railway line (Heitersbergstrecke) is a Swiss railway line between the stations of Killwangen-Spreitenbach and Aarau on the east–west main line between Zürich and Bern. The main structure of the line is the 4,929-metre-long (3.063 mi) Heitersberg Tunnel, which has its west portal near Mellingen and its east portal near Killwangen.

The line was built in the 1970s as part of the planned New Main Transversal (Neue Haupttransversale, NHT) project. It was opened on 1 June 1975 and handed over for scheduled operations on 22 May 1975.

== Route ==
The Heitersberg route branches off from the Zürich–Baden–Aarau–Olten–Bern main line after Killwangen and runs through an almost five kilometre-long tunnel to Heitersberg (west portal at 47°25′43″N 8°16′47″E, east portal at 47°26′15″N 8°20′34″E), connecting in Mellingen with the line from Wettingen built by the Swiss National Railway (Schweizerische Nationalbahn) and in Othmarsingen with the Brugg–Hendschiken railway line from Brugg AG to Rotkreuz. Outside of Othmarsingen, there is a three-level crossing with a cantonal road and branches running towards Hendschiken and Lenzburg. West of Lenzburg a new line runs to Rupperswil and then it turns into a recently rebuilt four-track section to Aarau.

Thanks to the new direct line, including the tunnel, which allows speeds of 140 km/h, the running time between Zürich and Bern has been reduced by 20 minutes, partly as a result of the building of other structures such as the Grauholz Tunnel near Bern.

Ballastless track was tested in the Heitersberg tunnel from 1975 to 2014.

== Development projects ==
The development of the Heitersberg route is part of the Zukünftige Entwicklung der Bahninfrastruktur (future development of rail infrastructure) program. The construction of the Chestenberg Tunnel between Rupperswil and Gruemet was proposed, but a direct 30 km-long tunnel between Aarau and Zürich is now favoured. The Eppenberg Tunnel was built between 2015 and 2020 as a continuation of the Heitersberg line towards Olten.

In December 2023 a new connecting track was completed between Mägenwil and the Brugg–Hendschiken line, enabling direct access to Birr. This line will be used by freight traffic and enable more frequent service on the S11 between Mägenwil and Aarau.
