= Lenzburg railway station =

Railway station in Switzerland

Lenzburg
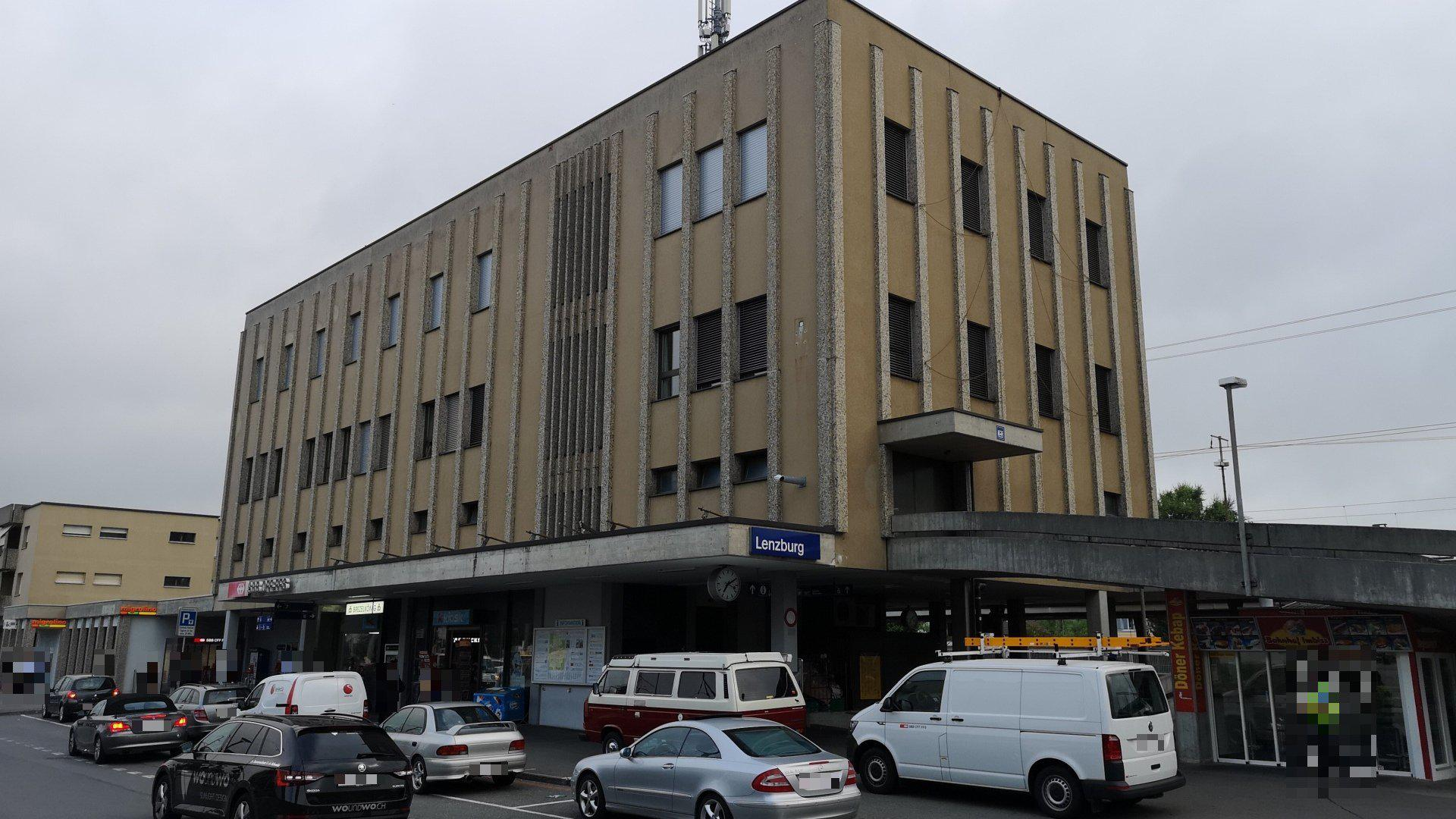
- The station building in 2018

General information
- Location: Bahnhofstrasse; Lenzburg; Switzerland
- Coordinates: 47°23′28″N 8°10′13″E
- Elevation: 406 m (1,332 ft)
- Owner: Swiss Federal Railways
- Lines: Rupperswil–Immensee line; Heitersberg line; Seetal line; Zofingen–Wettingen line
- Distance: 31.9 km (19.8 mi) from Zürich HB; 42.2 km (26.2 mi) from Emmenbrücke; 59.8 km (37.2 mi) from Suhr
- Train operators: Swiss Federal Railways
- Connections: Regionalbus Lenzburg AG

Other information
- Fare zone: 530 (Tarifverbund A-Welle)

Passengers
- 2025: 27,600 per day (SBB, SOB)
- Rank: 25 out of 1,095
Services
Preceding station	SBB CFF FFS	Following station
Aarau towards Basel SBB	IR 37	Zürich HB Terminus
Aarau Terminus	RE37	Zürich HB Terminus
Aarau towards Olten	RE6 Limited service	Wohlen towards Arth-Goldau
Preceding station	Zurich S-Bahn	Following station
Aarau Terminus	S11	Othmarsingen towards Seuzach or Wila
Rupperswil towards Aarau	SN1 Limited service	Othmarsingen towards Winterthur
Rupperswil towards Olten	SN11 Limited service	Othmarsingen towards Winterthur
Preceding station	Aargau S-Bahn	Following station
Rupperswil towards Langenthal	S23	Othmarsingen towards Baden
Aarau towards Olten	S26	Hendschiken towards Rotkreuz
Hunzenschwil towards Zofingen	S28	Terminus
Preceding station	Lucerne S-Bahn	Following station
Terminus	S9	Seon Nord towards Lucerne
Route map
Location
- Location within Switzerland Location within Canton of Aargau

Lenzburg railway station (German: Bahnhof Lenzburg) is a railway station in the municipality of Lenzburg in the Swiss canton of Aargau.

The station is located on the Heitersberg line, part of the Zurich to Olten main line, to the west of the junction with the Rupperswil–Immensee line and to the east of the junction with the Zofingen–Wettingen line. The Seetal line, which, despite being a standard gauge Swiss Federal Railways line, retains some characteristics of a roadside tramway, terminates at a platform across the street from the main station.

Seetal railway's main station in Lenzburg was Lenzburg Stadt on the line to Wildegg. The station was closed in 1984 and that line dismantled.

== Services ==
As of the December 2023 timetable change, the following services stop at Lenzburg, including two nighttime services (SN1, SN11):

- InterRegio/RegioExpress:
  - /RE37: half-hourly service between Aarau and Zürich Hauptbahnhof; InterRegio trains continue from Aarau to Basel SBB.
- RegioExpress RE6: three round-trips on weekends between Olten and Arth-Goldau.
- Zürich S-Bahn:
  - S11: half-hourly service between Aarau and Winterthur; hourly service to Seuzach or Sennhof-Kyburg; rush-hour service to Wila.
  - SN1: on Friday and Saturday night, hourly service between Aarau and Winterthur via Zürich Stadelhofen.
  - SN11: hourly service between Winterthur and Olten, via Zürich HB.
- Aargau S-Bahn:
  - S23: hourly service between Langenthal and Baden.
  - S26: half-hourly service to Rotkreuz and hourly service to Olten.
  - S28: half-hourly service to Zofingen.
- Lucerne S-Bahn S9: half-hourly service to Lucerne.

== See also ==
- Rail transport in Switzerland
