= Regionalbus Lenzburg AG =

Swiss public transportation company

- Company type: private company
- Industry: public transport
- Founded: 1970
- Headquarters: Lenzburg, Switzerland
- Area served: Aargau
- Parent: None

Regionalbus Lenzburg AG is a small company providing bus services to Lenzburg, in the Canton of Aargau, Switzerland, and its neighbouring villages. The company operates 20 buses on 10 commercial routes, and in addition a night bus service which operates in the early hours of Saturday and Sunday mornings.

== Fleet ==
As of January 2014 the fleet consisted of 20+ vehicles

== See also ==
- Transport in Switzerland
- List of bus operating companies in Switzerland
