= Brugg AG railway station =

Railway station in Switzerland

Brugg AG
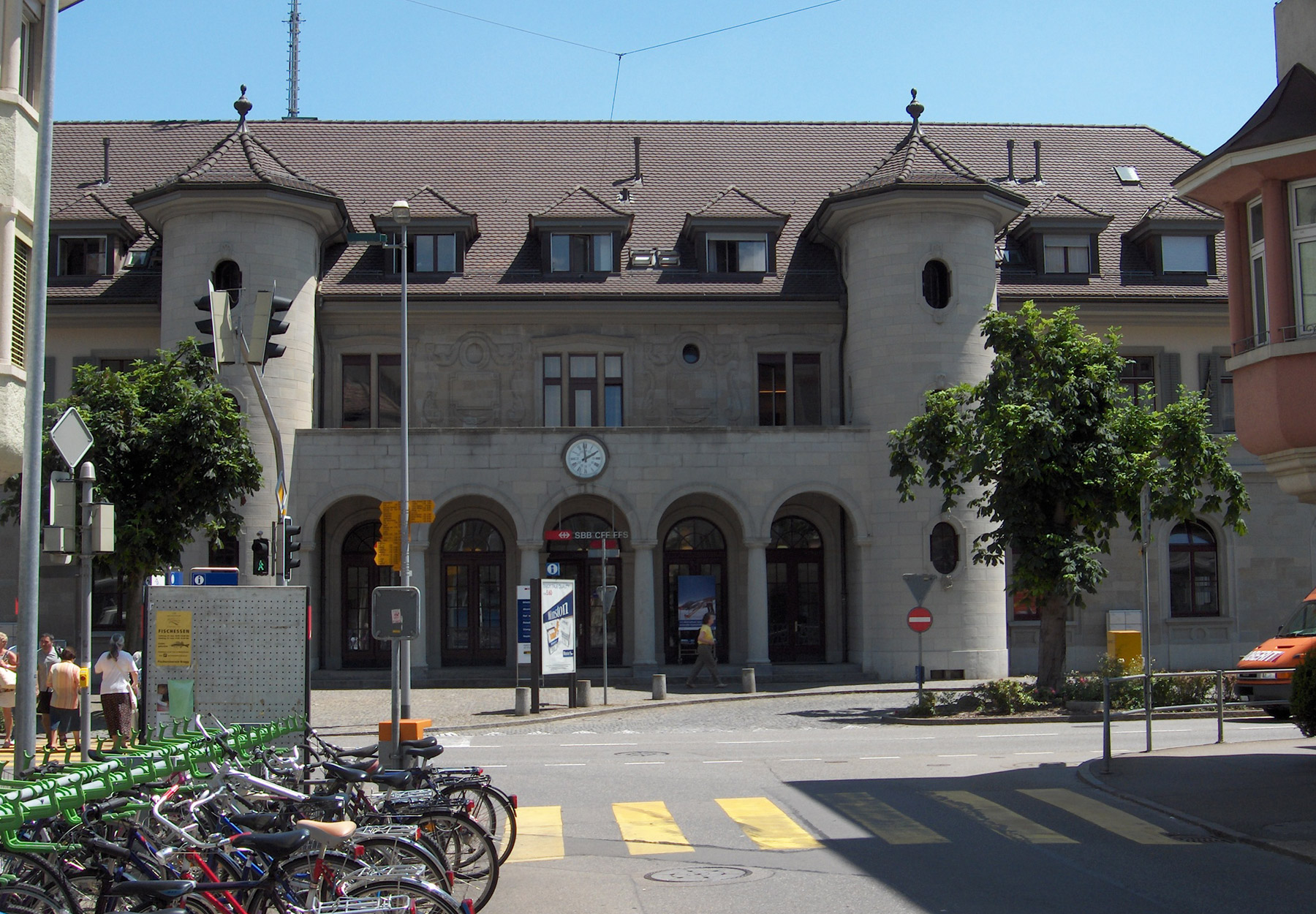
- The station building in 2006

General information
- Location: Brugg (since 1863), Windisch (1856-1863); Switzerland
- Coordinates: 47°28′51″N 8°12′32″E
- Elevation: 352 m (1,155 ft)
- Owner: Swiss Federal Railways (since 1902); Schweizerische Nordostbahn (1856-1902)
- Lines: Baden–Aarau line; Bözberg line; Brugg–Hendschiken line
- Distance: 31.3 km (19.4 mi) from Zürich Hauptbahnhof
- Platforms: 3
- Tracks: 5
- Train operators: Swiss Federal Railways
- Connections: PostAuto Schweiz

Construction
- Architect: Jakob Friedrich Wanner

Other information
- Fare zone: 560 (Tarifverbund A-Welle)

History
- Opened: 29 September 1856

Passengers
- 2025: 22,800 per day (SBB)
- Rank: 33 out of 1,095

Services
Preceding station	SBB CFF FFS	Following station
Aarau towards Bern	IR 16	Baden towards Zürich HB
Frick towards Basel SBB	IR 36	Baden towards Zürich Airport
Wildegg towards Olten	RE12	Turgi towards Wettingen
Preceding station	Zurich S-Bahn	Following station
Terminus	S12	Turgi towards Schaffhausen or Wil
Lupfig towards Aarau	SN1 Limited service	Turgi towards Winterthur
Preceding station	Aargau S-Bahn	Following station
Lupfig towards Langenthal	S23	Turgi towards Baden
Lupfig towards Muri AG	S25	Terminus
Schinznach Bad towards Sursee	S29	Turgi Terminus
Location

Brugg AG railway station (German: Bahnhof Brugg AG) serves the municipality of Brugg, in the canton of Aargau, Switzerland. Opened in 1856, it is owned and operated by Swiss Federal Railways.

The station forms the junction between the Baden–Aarau railway, part of the original line between Zurich and Olten, the Bözberg railway line (German: Bözbergstrecke), which links Basel SBB with Brugg, and the Brugg–Hendschiken line, which links Brugg with Rotkreuz.

== Location ==
Brugg railway station is situated at the intersection between the Aarauerstrasse and the Bahnhofstrasse, at the southeastern edge of the town centre.

On construction, the site of the station was part of the neighboring municipality Windisch and was only sold to Brugg in 1863.

The station has three platforms serving five tracks.

== Services ==
As of the December 2023 timetable change, the following services stop at Brugg AG:

- InterRegio: half-hourly service to Basel SBB and Zürich Hauptbahnhof, hourly service to Bern and Zürich Airport.
- RegioExpress: hourly service between Olten and Wettingen.
- Zürich S-Bahn:
  - S12: half-hourly service to Winterthur; trains continue from Winterthur to Schaffhausen or Wil.
  - SN1: on Friday and Saturday night, hourly service between Aarau and Winterthur via Zürich Stadelhofen.
- Aargau S-Bahn:
  - S23: hourly service between Langenthal and Baden.
  - S25: hourly service to Muri AG.
  - S29: half-hourly service between Aarau and Turgi, with every other train continuing from Aarau to Sursee.

== See also ==
- History of rail transport in Switzerland
- Rail transport in Switzerland
