= Muri AG railway station =

Railway station in Switzerland

Muri AG
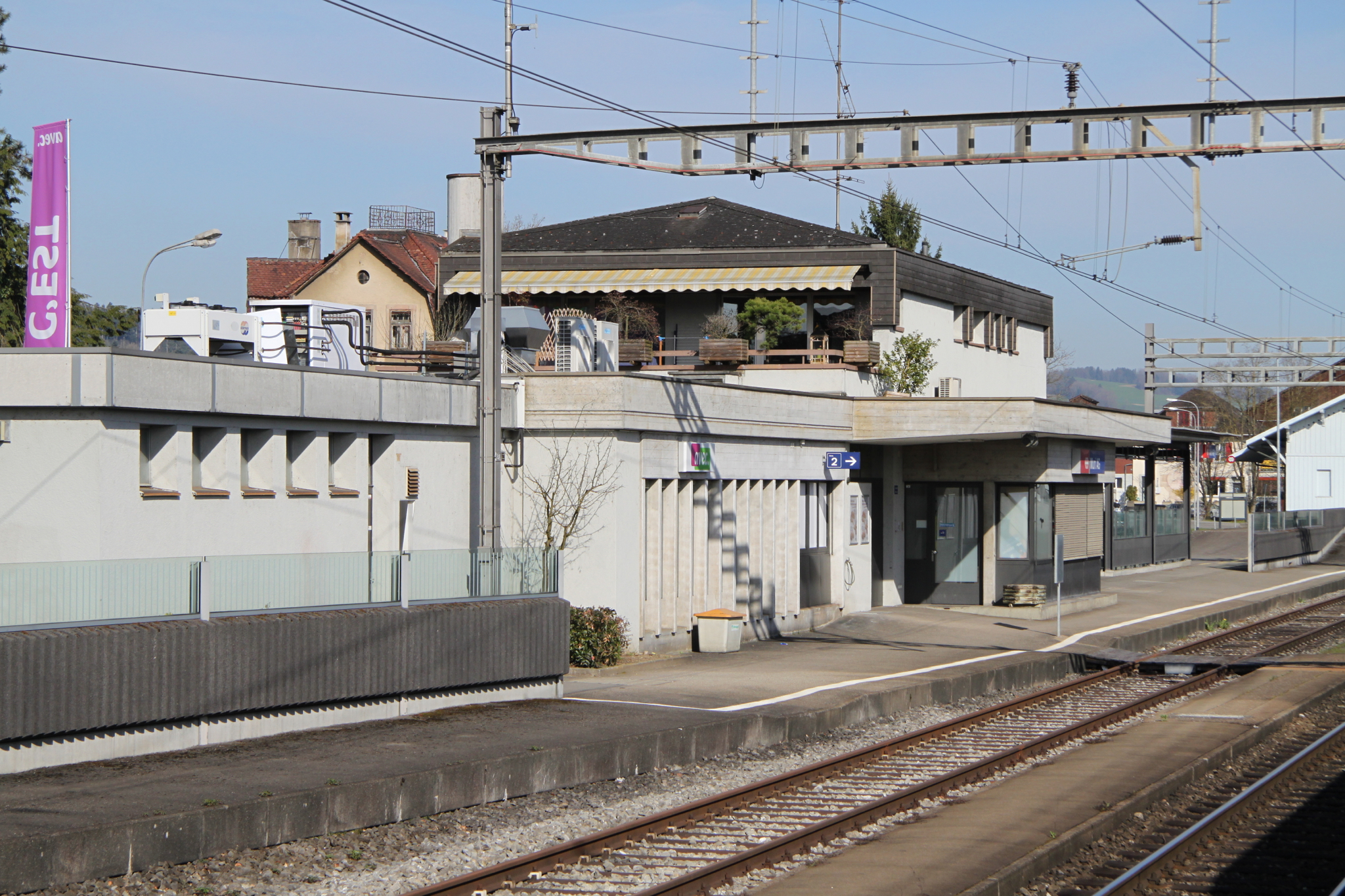
- The station in 2015

General information
- Location: Muri; Switzerland
- Coordinates: 47°17′N 8°20′E
- Owner: Swiss Federal Railways
- Line: Rupperswil–Immensee line
- Distance: 81.5 km (50.6 mi) from Basel SBB
- Train operators: Swiss Federal Railways
- Connections: PostAuto Schweiz buses

Passengers
- 2018: 2,900 per weekday

Services
Preceding station	SBB CFF FFS	Following station
Wohlen towards Olten	RE6 Limited service	Rotkreuz towards Arth-Goldau
Preceding station	Aargau S-Bahn	Following station
Wohlen towards Brugg AG	S25	Terminus
Boswil-Bünzen towards Olten	S26	Benzenschwil towards Rotkreuz
Preceding station	Zurich S-Bahn	Following station
Boswil-Bünzen towards Zürich Hauptbahnhof	S42	Terminus
Location

Muri AG railway station (German: Bahnhof Muri AG) is a railway station in the municipality of Muri, in the Swiss canton of Aargau. It is an intermediate stop on the standard gauge Rupperswil–Immensee line of Swiss Federal Railways.

== Services ==
As of the December 2023 timetable change, the following services stop at Muri AG:

- RegioExpress: three round-trips on weekends between Olten and Arth-Goldau.
- Zürich S-Bahn S42: rush-hour service to Zürich Hauptbahnhof.
- Aargau S-Bahn:
  - S25: hourly service to Brugg AG.
  - S26: half-hourly service between Lenzburg and Rotkreuz, with every other train continuing from Lenzburg to Olten.
