= Aarau railway station =

Railway station in Aargau, Switzerland

Aarau
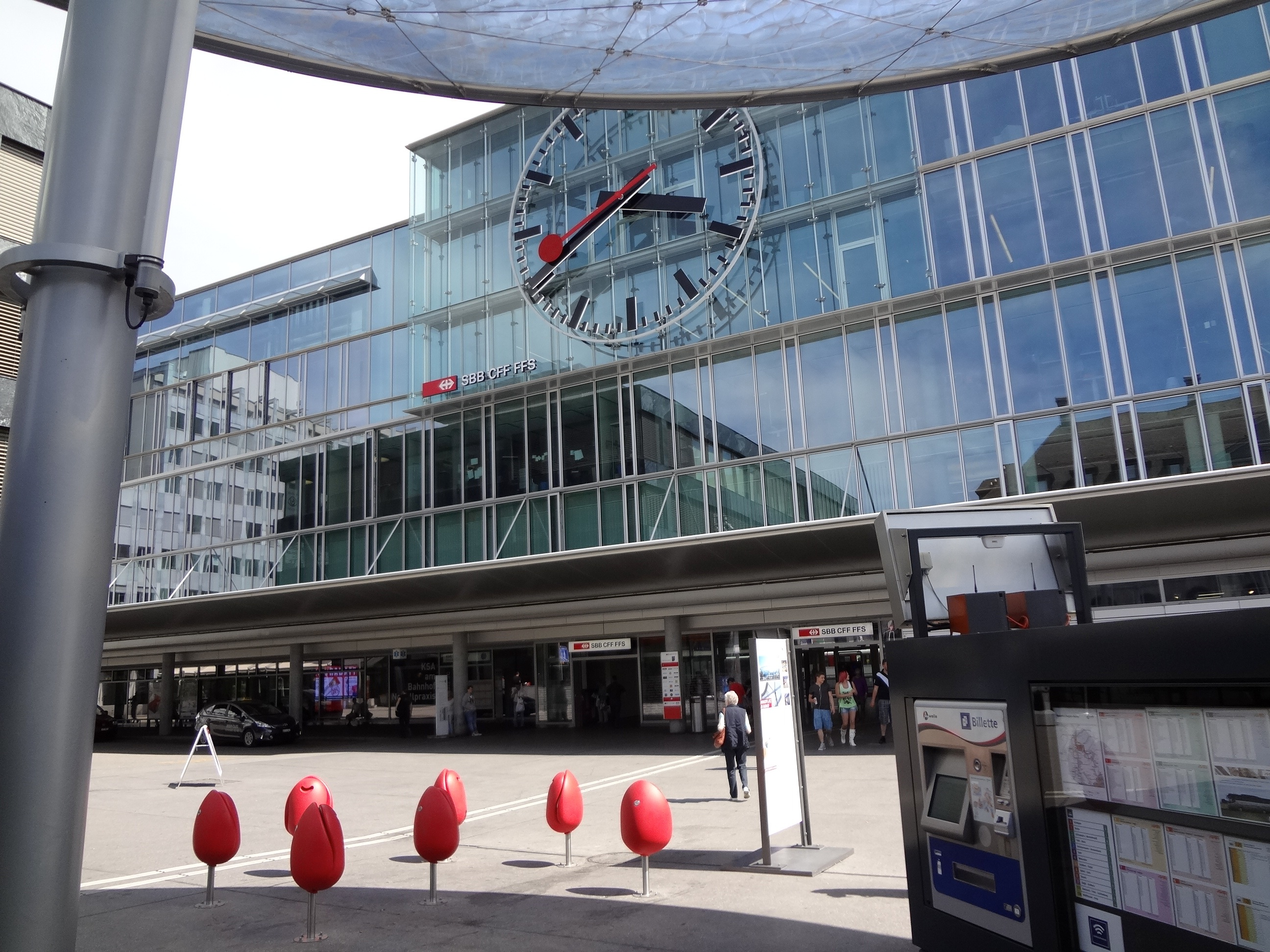
- The station building in 2014

General information
- Location: Bahnhofstrasse 72; Aarau; Switzerland
- Coordinates: 47°23′29″N 8°03′05″E
- Elevation: 384 metres (1,260 ft)
- Owner: Swiss Federal Railways
- Lines: Heitersberg line; Olten–Aarau line; Baden–Aarau line
- Distance: 41.5 km (25.8 mi) from Zürich HB
- Platforms: 4
- Tracks: 6
- Train operators: Swiss Federal Railways
- Connections: BBA Bus Aarau and PostAuto bus

Other information
- Fare zone: A-Welle: 510
- Website: Bahnhof Aarau

History
- Opened: 9 June 1856

Passengers
- 2025: 40,100 per day (SBB, SOB)
- Rank: 18 out of 1,095

Services
Preceding station	SBB CFF FFS	Following station
Olten towards Lausanne	IC 5	Zürich HB towards Zürich HB, St. Gallen or Rorschach
Olten towards Bern	IR 16	Brugg AG towards Zürich HB
Gelterkinden towards Basel SBB	IR 37	Lenzburg towards Zürich HB
Schönenwerd towards Olten	RE6 Limited service	Lenzburg towards Arth-Goldau
Olten Terminus	RE12	Wildegg towards Wettingen
Terminus	RE37	Lenzburg towards Zürich HB
Preceding station	Zurich S-Bahn	Following station
Terminus	S11	Lenzburg towards Seuzach or Wila
Terminus	SN1 Limited service	Rupperswil towards Winterthur
Schönenwerd towards Olten	SN11 Limited service	Rupperswil towards Winterthur
Preceding station	Aargau S-Bahn	Following station
Binzenhof towards Schöftland	S14 transfer at Aarau WSB	Aarau Torfeld towards Menziken
Schönenwerd towards Langenthal	S23	Rupperswil towards Baden
Schönenwerd towards Olten	S26	Lenzburg towards Rotkreuz
Olten towards Sursee	S29	Rupperswil towards Turgi
Location
- Location within Switzerland Location within Canton of Aargau

Aarau railway station (German: Bahnhof Aarau) serves the municipality of Aarau, capital town of the canton of Aargau, Switzerland. Opened in 1856, it is owned and operated by Swiss Federal Railways (SBB CFF FFS).

The station forms the junction between the Olten–Aarau railway, the Zurich-Aarau railway and the Baden–Aarau railway. Previously, it was also a terminus of the now closed Aarau–Suhr railway.

On the southern side of the station yard is the separate railway station Aarau WSB for the metre gauge trains of the Menziken–Aarau–Schöftland line of Aargau Verkehr AG (AVA). Its infrastructure (its own station building, 2 platforms serving three tracks, no. 11–13) is directly connected with Aarau railway station.

== Location ==
Aarau railway station is situated in the Bahnhofstrasse, at the south eastern edge of the old town.

== Services ==
As of the December 2025 timetable change, the following services stop at Aarau, including two nighttime services (SN1, SN11) offered by the Zürcher Verkehrsverbund (ZVV):

- Intercity: hourly service between Lausanne and Rorschach.
- InterRegio:
  - : hourly service between Bern and Zürich Hauptbahnhof.
  - : hourly service between Basel SBB and Zürich Hauptbahnhof.
- RegioExpress:
  - RE12: hourly service between Olten and Wettingen.
  - RE37: hourly service to Zürich Hauptbahnhof.
  - RE6: three round-trips on weekends between Olten and Arth-Goldau.
- Aargau S-Bahn:
  - S23: hourly service between Langenthal and Baden.
  - S26: hourly service to Rotkreuz.
  - S29: hourly service to Sursee and half-hourly service to Turgi.
- Zurich S-Bahn
  - S11: half-hourly service to Winterthur; every other train continues to Seuzach or Wila
  - SN1: on Friday and Saturday night, hourly service to Winterthur via Zürich Stadelhofen.
  - SN11: on Friday and Saturday night, hourly service between Winterthur and Olten, via Zürich HB.

== See also ==
- Rail transport in Switzerland
