= Aargau S-Bahn =

Rail network in Aargau, Switzerland

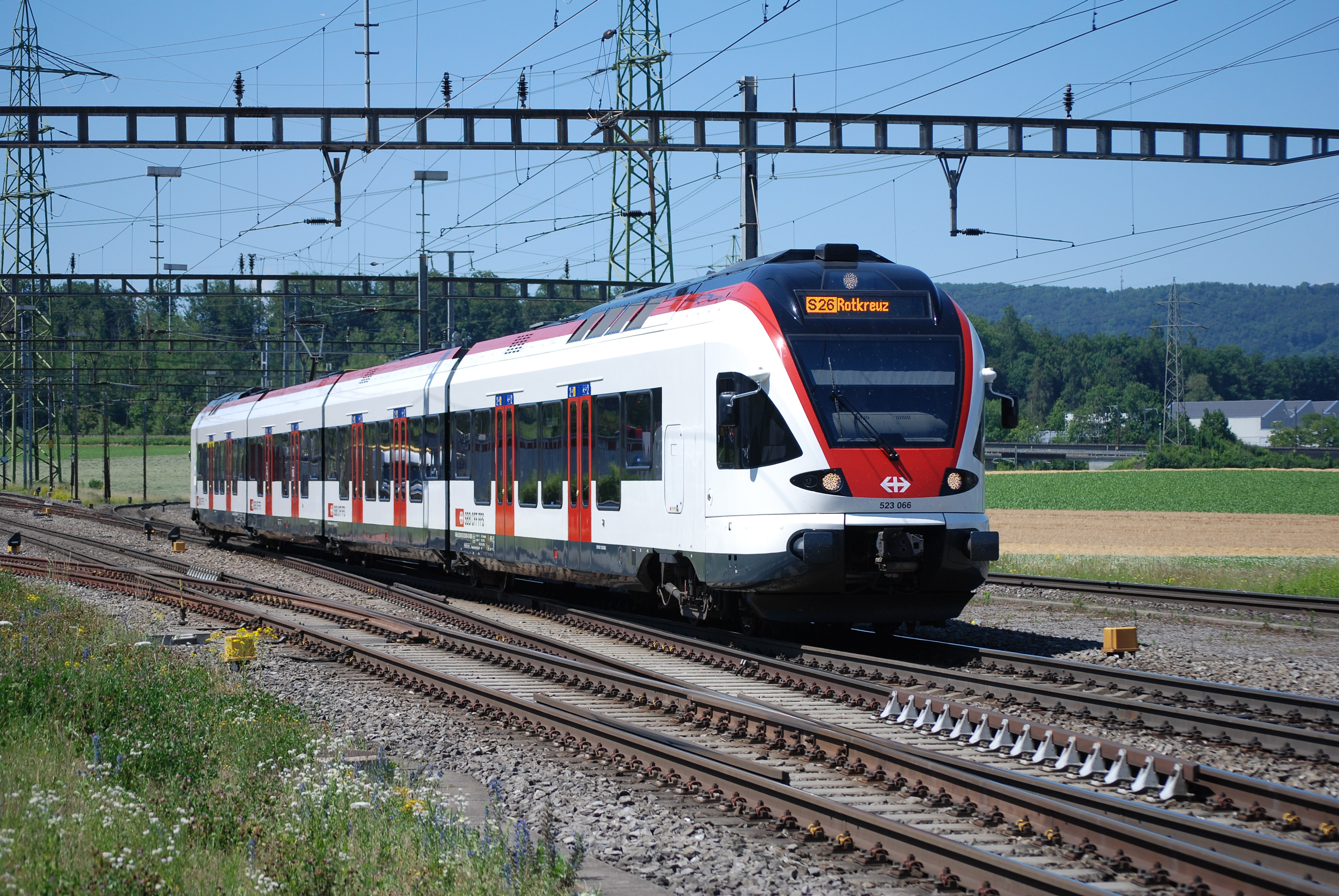
- An RABe 523 operating as S26 service near Hendschiken in 2018.

Overview
- Locale: Aargau, Switzerland
- Transit type: S-Bahn
- Number of lines: 7
- Number of stations: 78
- Website: Aargau S-Bahn (SBB-CFF-FFS) (in English); AAR bus+bahn (in German)

Operation
- Operators: Aargau Verkehr; Swiss Federal Railways

Technical
- Track gauge: 1,435 mm (4 ft 8 1/2 in) (SBB-CFF-FFS); 1,000 mm (3 ft 3 3/8 in) (AAR bus+bahn)

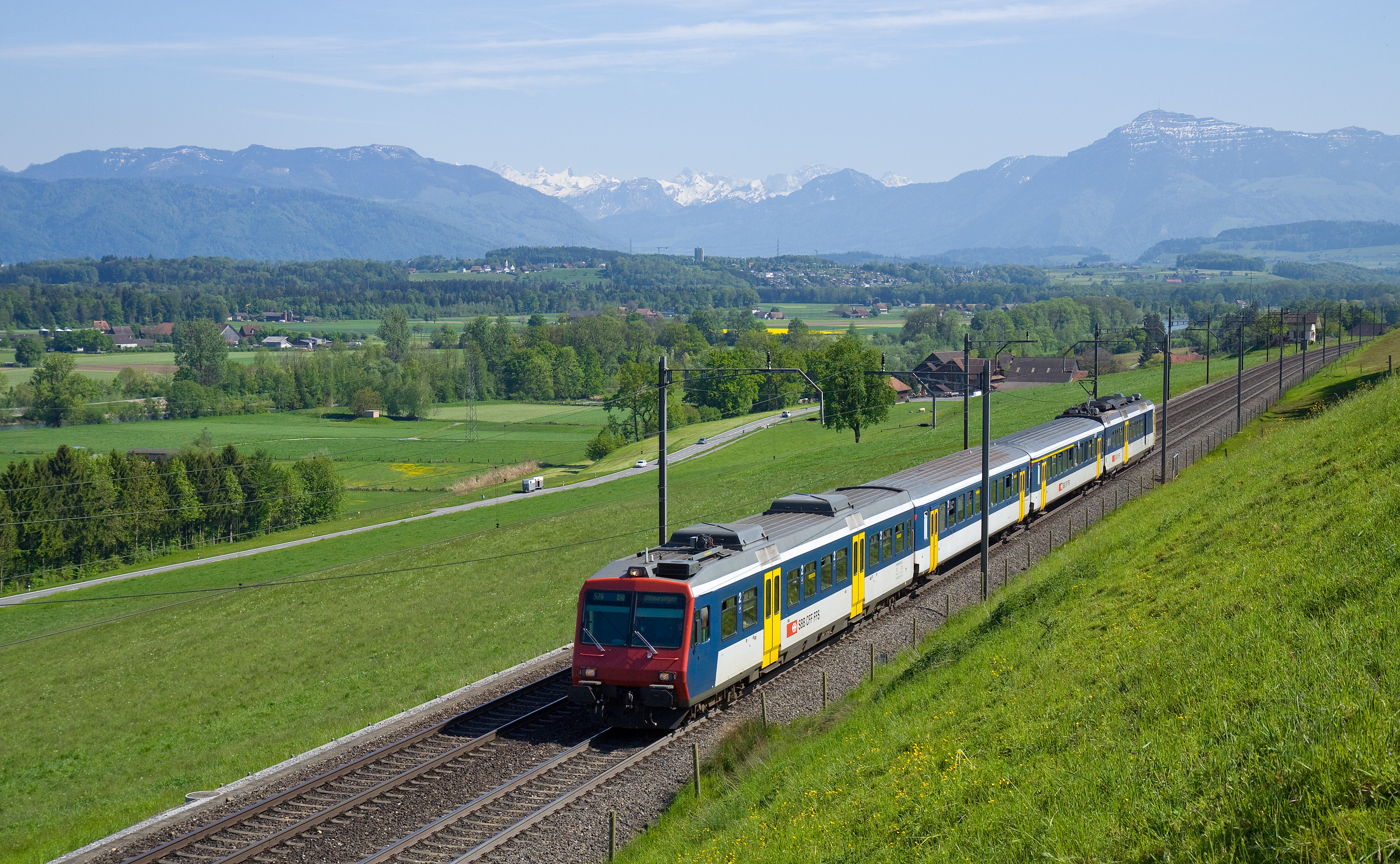
An RBDe 560 (NPZ) operating as S26 service between Sins and Mühlau in 2009.

The Aargau S-Bahn (German: S-Bahn Aargau or S-Bahnen Aargau) is an S-Bahn-style regional rail network serving the canton of Aargau, Switzerland, with some services extending into the cantons of Bern, Lucerne, Solothurn and Zug and one service to the German city of Waldshut-Tiengen. It operates within the A-Welle tariff network.

== History ==
Upon the timetable change on 14 December 2008, an S-Bahn numbering system was introduced for regional rail services in Aargau.

The new S-Bahn network was designed to complement the existing adjacent S-Bahn networks in Central Switzerland, Zurich and Basel. With that in mind, the line numbers selected for the new network were in the 20s (except the S14 Menziken–Aarau–Schöftland), so that there would be no conflict with the other networks.

The new network was essentially a redesignation of its existing lines. No new stops were built for it, and no new rolling stock was purchased. In some cases, however, certain services in the 2007/2008 timetable were modified (e.g. the Langenthal–Baden through connection), and to a limited extent the frequency of services was increased.

On 15 December 2019 the S29 was extended from Aarau to Sursee, replacing the Lucerne S-Bahn S8.

== Lines ==
As of December 2019, the network consists of the following lines. Unless otherwise stated, the lines are 1,435 mm or 4 ft 8 1/2 in standard gauge.

#	Route	Notes	Operator
S14	Menziken–Suhr–Aarau WSB–Schöftland	1,000 mm (3 ft 3 3/8 in) gauge	Aargau Verkehr
S23	Baden–Brugg AG–Lenzburg–Aarau–Olten–Langenthal		Swiss Federal Railways
S25	Muri AG–Wohlen AG–Brugg AG	Service does not call at Boswil-Bünzen	Swiss Federal Railways
S26	Olten–Aarau–Lenzburg–Wohlen AG–Muri AG	Service does not call at Rupperswil	Swiss Federal Railways
S27	Baden–Waldshut / Bad Zurzach	Alternating service to Waldshut (Germany) or Bad Zurzach	Swiss Federal Railways
S28	Lenzburg–Suhr–Zofingen		Swiss Federal Railways
S29	Turgi–Brugg AG–Aarau–Olten–Zofingen–Sursee	Service does not call at stations between Aarau and Olten	Swiss Federal Railways

The system is supported by regional trains of Zürich S-Bahn, with railway stations in the eastern part of the canton being only served by the latter. The following services of Zürich S-Bahn serve stations in the canton of Aargau: S6 (Baden–Regensdorf-Watt–Uetikon), S11 (Aarau–Seuzach/Wila), S12 (Brugg AG–Schaffhausen/Wil), S17 (Wohlen–Dietikon), S19 (Koblenz–Pfäffikon ZH), section Koblenz–Dietikon only served during peak-hour), S36 (Waldshut–Bülach) and S42 (Muri AG–Zürich HB, peak-hour only). Since 2022, the section between Killwangen-Spreitenbach and Zürich Altstetten is additionally supported by tram line 20 (Limmattalbahn).

Stations in the northwest of the canton of Argau are served by the S1 of Basel S-Bahn (Frick/Laufenburg–Basel SBB).

Stations along the Seetal railway line (Lenzburg–Lucerne) are served by the S9 of Lucerne S-Bahn.

The system is additionally supported by RegioExpress (RE) trains RE6 (Olten–Arth-Goldau, limited service), RE12 (Olten–Wettingen) and RE37 (Aarau–Zürich HB).

== Related services ==
With the December 2021 timetable change, Swiss Federal Railways applied "S" designations to three Regio services in the canton of Solothurn:

- S20: Biel/Bienne / (Oberdorf SO –) Solothurn–Olten
- S21: Moutier–Solothurn
- S22: Oensingen–Balsthal

=== Network map ===
These were numbered S20–S22 to avoid conflicts with the Aargau S-Bahn and are not part of the network.

== See also ==
- Transport in Aargau
