= A-Welle =

Swiss tariff network

A-Welle, more formally known as the Tarifverbund A-Welle or sometimes the Tarifverbund Aargau, is a Swiss tariff network covering the canton of Aargau, with the exception of the districts of Laufenburg and Rheinfelden, together with the eastern part of the canton of Solothurn.

The Tarifverbund A-Welle was created on 12 December 2004, when the previous tariff associations for Olten and Aargau merged. Initially the tariff network applied only to season tickets and passes, but it was expanded on 13 December 2009 to include single tickets as well as day and multi-trip tickets.

== Operators ==
The operators which make up the network are:

- Aare Seeland mobil (asm)
- Aargau Verkehr (AVA)
- Busbetrieb Aarau (BBA)
- Busbetrieb Olten Gösgen Gäu (BOGG)
- PostBus Switzerland
- Regionalbus Lenzburg
- Regionale Verkehrsbetriebe Baden-Wettingen (RVBW)
- Swiss Federal Railways (SBB)
- Zugerland Verkehrsbetriebe
