= Suhr railway station =

Railway station in Switzerland

Suhr
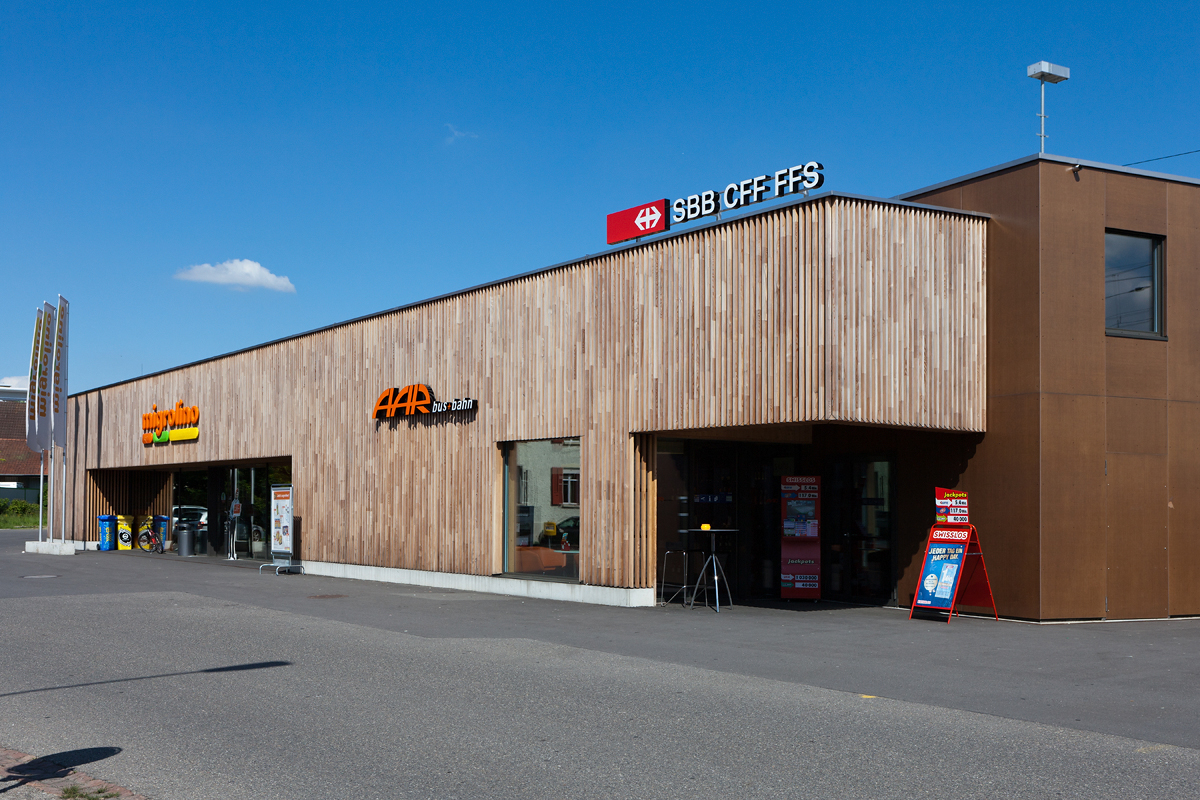
- The station building in 2013

General information
- Location: Suhr; Switzerland
- Coordinates: 47°22′18″N 8°04′56″E
- Owner: Swiss Federal Railways
- Lines: Schöftland–Aarau–Menziken line; Zofingen–Wettingen line; Aarau–Suhr line (closed 2004)
- Train operators: Aargau Verkehr; Swiss Federal Railways
- Connections: Busbetrieb Aarau buses

Passengers
- 2018: 2,100 per weekday (does not include S14)

Services
Preceding station	Aargau S-Bahn	Following station
Buchs AG towards Schöftland	S14	Gränichen Töndler towards Menziken
Oberentfelden towards Zofingen	S28	Hunzenschwil towards Lenzburg
Location
- Location within Switzerland Location within Canton of Aargau

Suhr railway station (German: Bahnhof Suhr) is a railway station in the municipality of Suhr, in the Swiss canton of Aargau. It is located at the intersection of the standard gauge Zofingen–Wettingen line of Swiss Federal Railways (SBB) and the 1,000 mm (3 ft 3 3/8 in) gauge Schöftland–Aarau–Menziken line of Aargau Verkehr.

== History ==
Suhr station was constructed by the Swiss National Railway (Schweizerische Nationalbahn; SNB). It was originally situated just to the west of the junction of the SNB's standard gauge Zofingen–Wettingen and Aarau–Suhr lines, opening with those lines in 1877. The station and former SNB lines became part of the Swiss Northeastern Railway (Schweizerische Nordostbahn; NOB) in 1878, and of the SBB in 1902. In 1904, the Wynental Railway (WTB) opened a metre gauge street tramway from Aarau to Menziken through Suhr, crossing the standard gauge line by a level crossing to the west of the station. In 1958 the WTB became part of the Wynental- und Suhrentalbahn (WSB) company.

In 2004, the SBB closed the standard gauge Aarau–Suhr line in order to permit the re-routing of the roughly parallel metre gauge line off surface streets. As part of this re-routing, a new underpass was constructed to take the narrow gauge line under the SBB's Zofingen to Wettingen line to the east of Suhr station, and new platforms built at the station providing direct interchange between the standard and metre gauge lines. The new route opened in 2010. In 2018, the WSB became part of the Aargau Verkehr AG (AVA) company.

== Services ==
The following services stop at Suhr:

- Aargau S-Bahn:
  - S14: service every fifteen minutes between Schöftland, Aarau WSB and Menziken, operated by AVA.
  - S28: half-hourly service between Zofingen and Lenzburg, operated by SBB.

== Bibliography ==
- Wägli, Hans G.; Jacobi, Sébastien (2010). Schienennetz Schweiz - Bahnprofil Schweiz CH+ [Swiss rail network] (in German) (3rd ed.). Zürich: AS Verlag. ISBN 978-3-909111-74-9.
- Walker, Peter J. (1964). Rails through the Suhre and Wyna Valleys, Switzerland. London: Light Railway Transport League. OCLC 1138035921.
