= Aarau Torfeld railway station =

Railway station in Switzerland

Aarau Torfeld
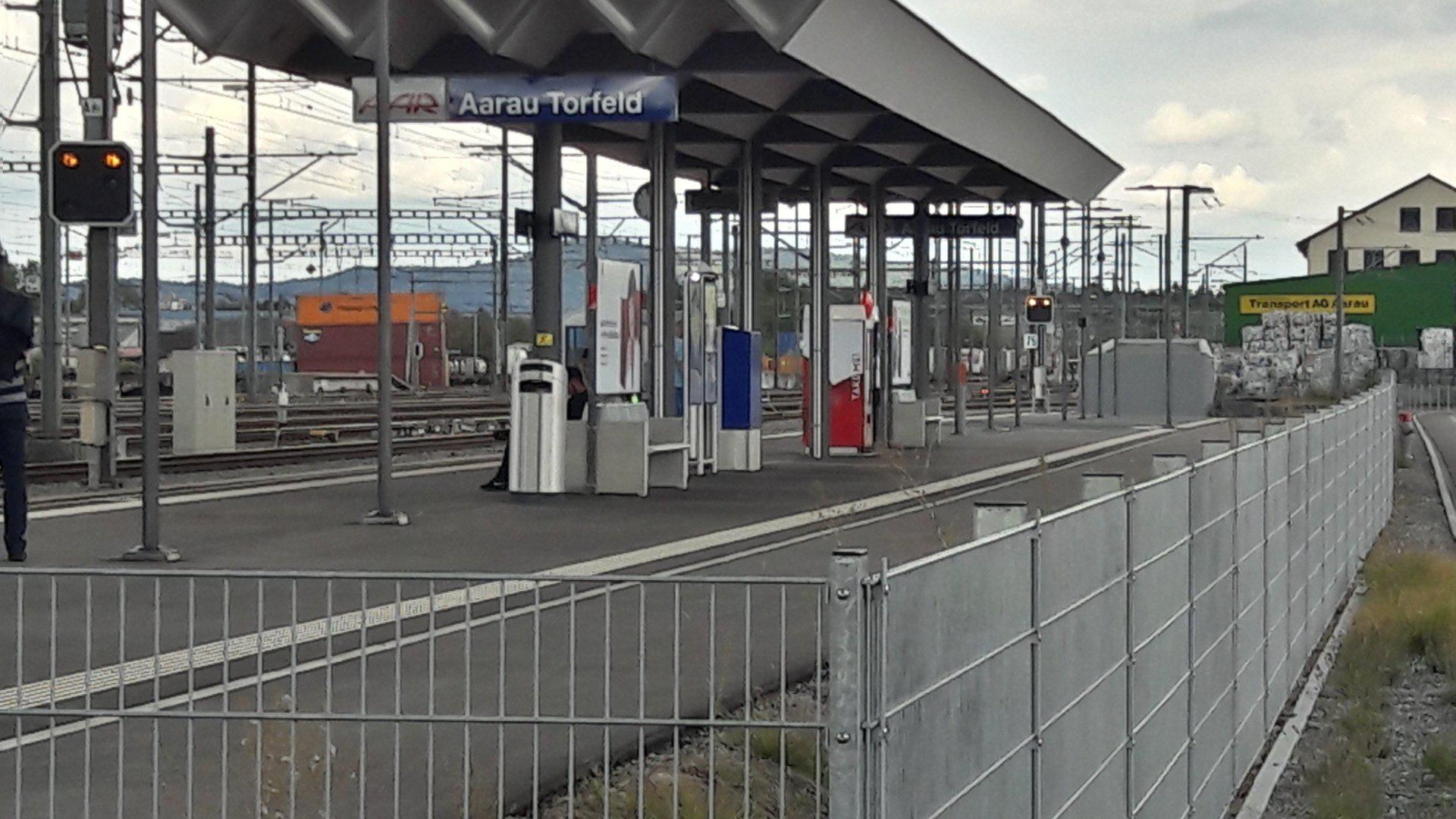
- The station platform in 2018

General information
- Location: Aarau; Switzerland
- Coordinates: 47°23′37″N 8°03′45″E
- Owner: Aargau Verkehr
- Line: Schöftland–Aarau–Menziken line
- Train operators: Aargau Verkehr

History
- Opened: 10 December 2017

Services
Preceding station	Aargau S-Bahn	Following station
Aarau WSB towards Schöftland	S14	Buchs AG towards Menziken
Location
- Location within Switzerland Location within Canton of Aargau

Aarau Torfeld railway station (German: Bahnhof Aarau Torfeld) is a railway station in the municipality of Aarau, in the Swiss canton of Aargau. It is an intermediate stop on the 1,000 mm (3 ft 3 3/8 in) gauge Schöftland–Aarau–Menziken line of Aargau Verkehr. The station opened on 10 December 2017.

== Services ==
The following services stop at Aarau Torfeld:

- Aargau S-Bahn S14: service every fifteen minutes between Schöftland, Aarau WSB and Menziken.
