= Aarau WSB railway station =

Railway station in Switzerland

Aarau WSB
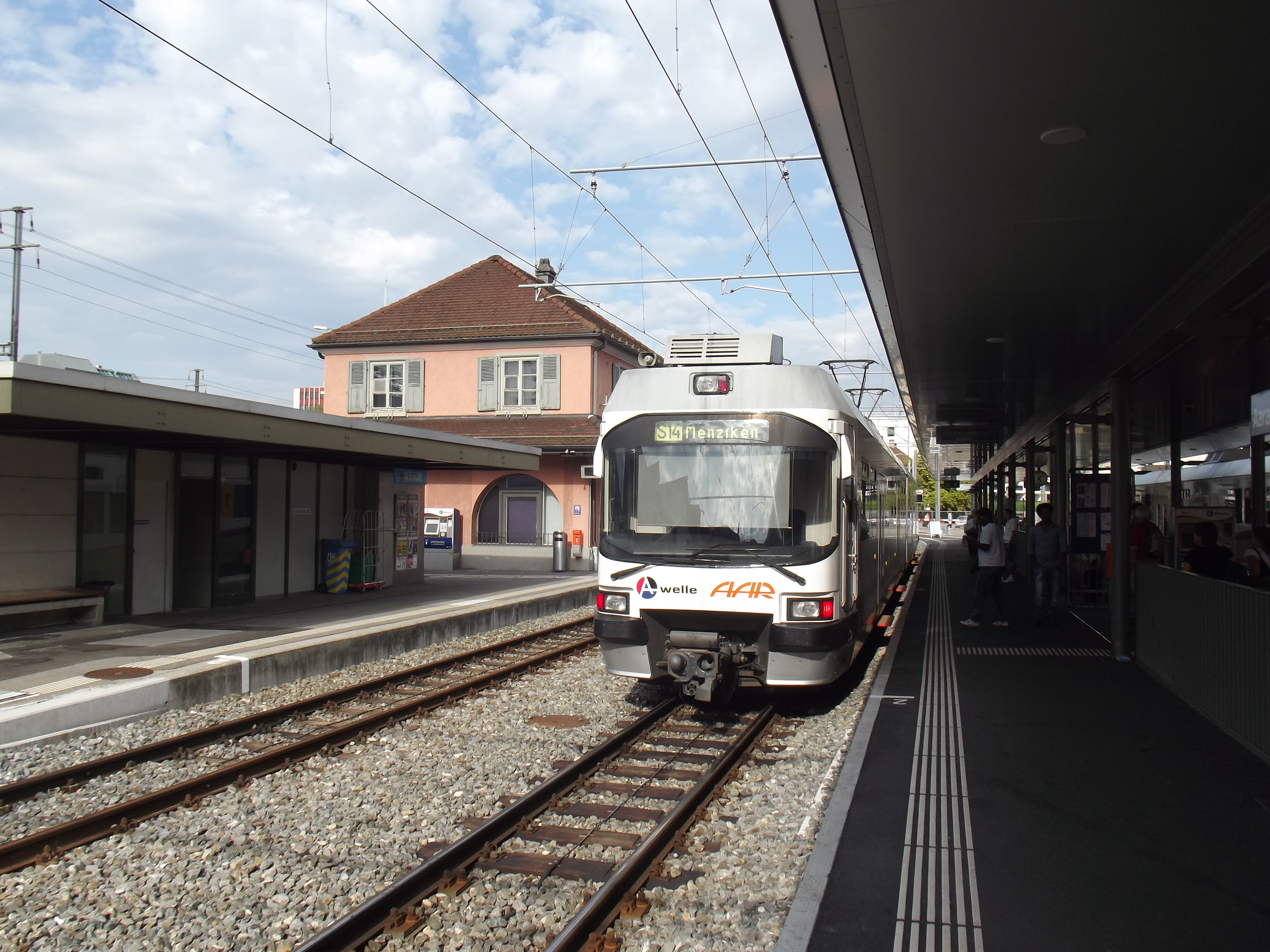
- An Aargau S-Bahn S14 service at Aarau WSB in 2013

General information
- Location: Aarau; Switzerland
- Coordinates: 47°23′27.5″N 8°03′09.7″E
- Owner: Aargau Verkehr
- Line: Schöftland–Aarau–Menziken line
- Train operators: Aargau Verkehr

Services
| Preceding station | Aargau S-Bahn | Following station |
|---|---|---|
| Binzenhof towards Schöftland | S14 | Aarau Torfeld towards Menziken |
Location
- Location within Switzerland Location within Canton of Aargau

Aarau WSB railway station (German: Bahnhof Aarau WSB) is a railway station in the municipality of Aarau, the capital city of the Swiss canton of Aargau. It is the principal intermediate point on the 1,000 mm (3 ft 3 3/8 in) gauge Schöftland–Aarau–Menziken line of Aargau Verkehr. The station is the main point of transfer to the Swiss Federal Railways (SBB) lines, and is situated across Hintere Bahnhofstrasse from the south side of the SBB station. The station buildings and platforms of both stations are connected by a common pedestrian subway.

The station has three tracks, served by a side platform and an island platform.

== History ==
The Schöftland–Aarau–Menziken line was constructed as two separate lines by two different companies, the Aarau-Schöftland Railway (AS) that opened in 1901, and the Wynental Railway (WTB) that opened in 1904. Initially both lines had their starting point in the street on the north side of the SBB station. In 1924, the WTB opened its own terminal station on the current WSB station site south of the SBB railway lines, whilst the AS continued running through the city streets to its stop on the north side, thus meaning that the direct connection between WTB and AS was lost.

In 1958 the AS and WTB companies were merged to form the Wynental- und Suhrentalbahn (WSB) company. In 1967, the former AS branch was relocated from its city centre street track into a 260-metre (850 ft) tunnel leading to the former WTB station on the south side of the SBB station, which thus became a through station and adopted the current name. In 2010 the section of the former WTB line between the station and Suhr, which ran in the street, was closed and replaced by a new route operating on the right of way of the closed SBB standard gauge branch that roughly paralleled the former route. In 2018 the WSB became part of the Aargau Verkehr AG (AVA), but the station retained its WSB suffix.

== Services ==
The following services stop at Aarau WSB:

- Aargau S-Bahn: S14: service every fifteen minutes between Schöftland and Menziken.
