= Buchs AG railway station =

Railway station in Switzerland

Buchs AG
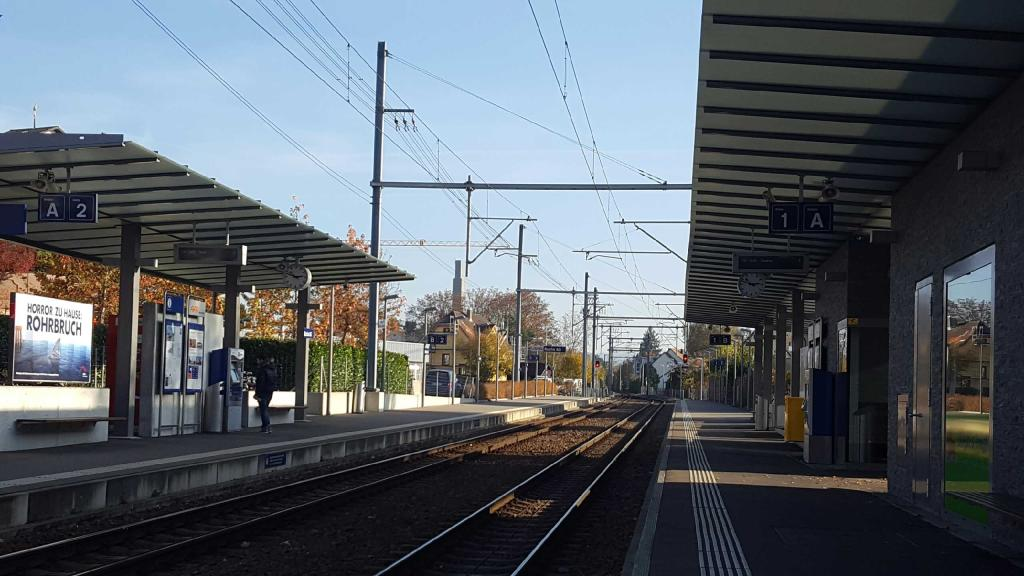
- The station platform in 2016

General information
- Location: Buchs; Switzerland
- Coordinates: 47°23′N 8°04′E
- Owner: Aargau Verkehr
- Line: Schöftland–Aarau–Menziken line
- Distance: 1.6 km (0.99 mi) from Aarau WSB
- Train operators: Aargau Verkehr

Services
Preceding station	Aargau S-Bahn	Following station
Aarau Torfeld towards Schöftland	S14	Suhr towards Menziken
Location
- Location within Switzerland Location within Canton of Aargau

Buchs AG railway station (German: Bahnhof Buchs AG) is a railway station in the municipality of Buchs, in the Swiss canton of Aargau (abbreviated to AG). It is an intermediate stop on the 1,000 mm (3 ft 3 3/8 in) gauge Schöftland–Aarau–Menziken line of Aargau Verkehr.

== Services ==
The following services stop at Buchs AG:

- Aargau S-Bahn S14: service every fifteen minutes between Schöftland, Aarau WSB and Menziken.
