= Reinach AG railway station =

Railway station in Switzerland

Reinach AG
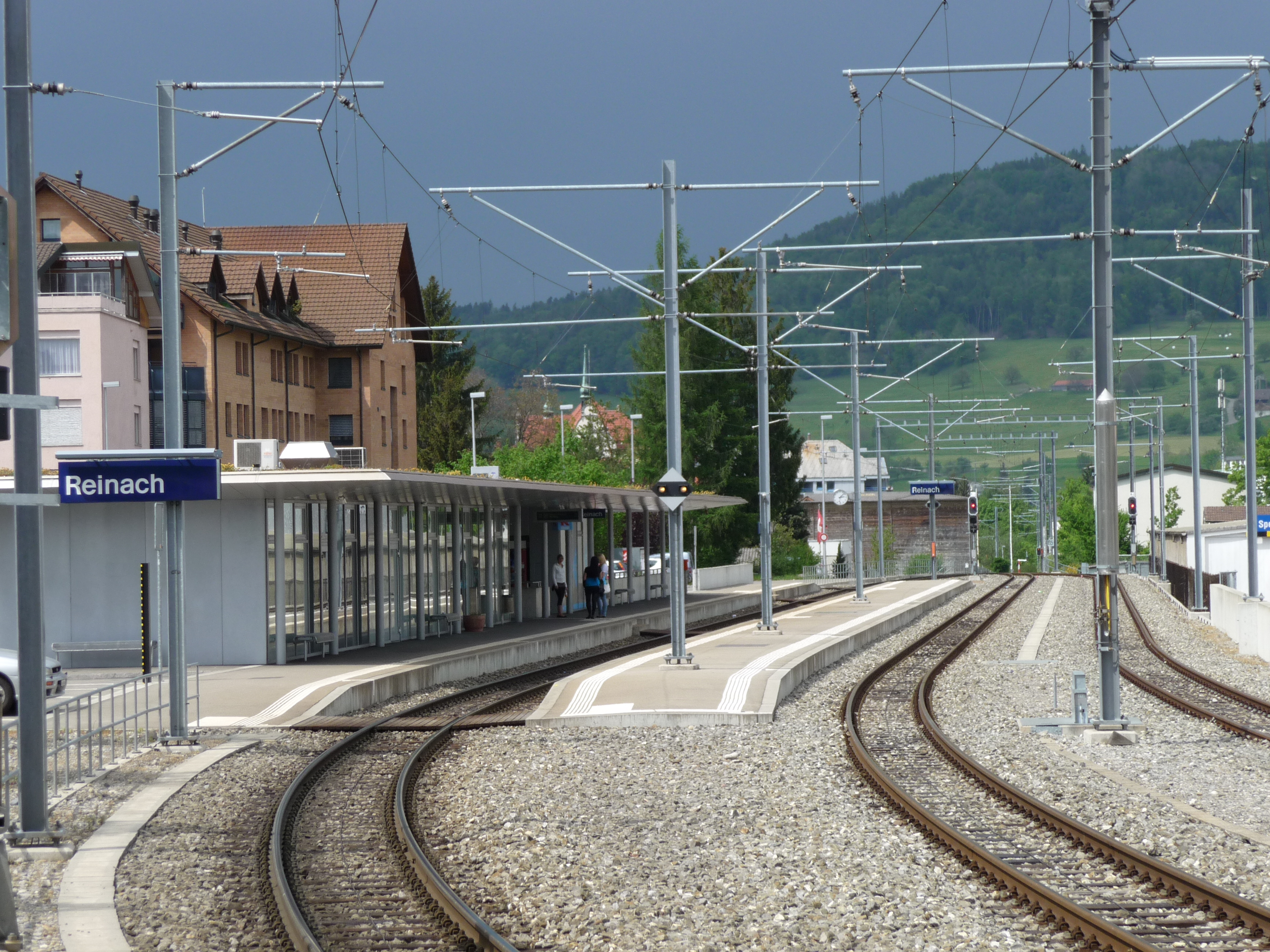
- Reinach AG railway station

General information
- Location: Reinach, Aargau, Switzerland
- Coordinates: 47°15′00″N 8°10′59″E
- Owner: Aargau Verkehr
- Line: Schöftland–Aarau–Menziken line
- Train operators: Aargau Verkehr

Services
Preceding station	Aargau S-Bahn	Following station
Reinach AG Mitte towards Schöftland	S14	Menziken Terminus
Location
- Location within Switzerland Location within Canton of Aargau

Reinach AG railway station (German: Bahnhof Reinach AG) is a railway station in the municipality of Reinach, in the Swiss canton of Aargau. It is the penultimate station at the eastern end of the 1,000 mm (3 ft 3 3/8 in) gauge Schöftland–Aarau–Menziken line of Aargau Verkehr.

== Services ==
The following services serve Reinach:

- Aargau S-Bahn S14: service every fifteen minutes to Menziken, Aarau, and Schöftland.
