= Schöftland Nordweg railway station =

Railway station in Switzerland

Schöftland Nordweg
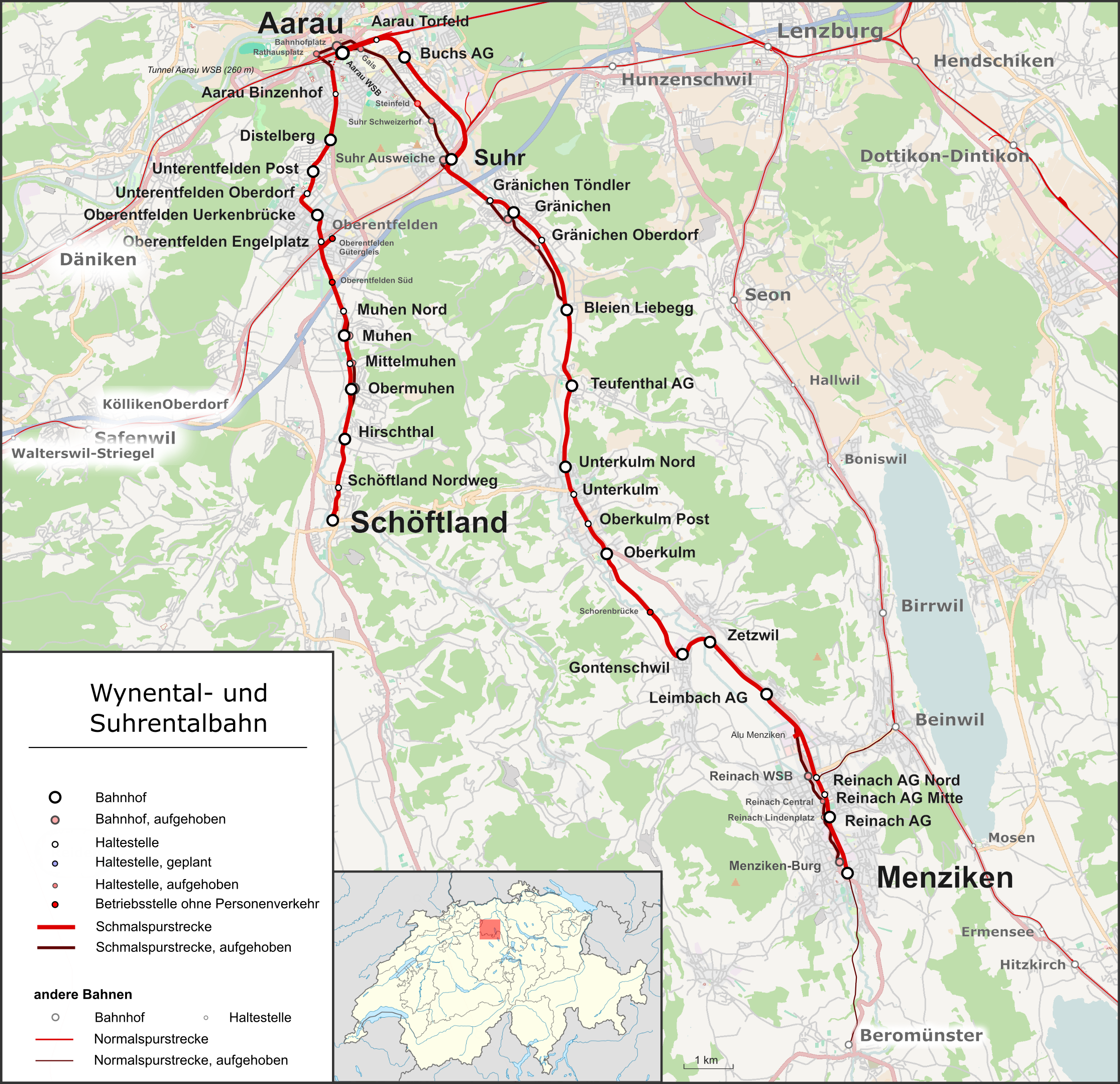
- Map of the full Schöftland-Aarau-Menziken route

General information
- Location: Schöftland; Switzerland
- Coordinates: 47°18′40″N 8°03′04″E
- Owner: Aargau Verkehr
- Line: Schöftland–Aarau–Menziken line
- Train operators: Aargau Verkehr

Services
Preceding station	Aargau S-Bahn	Following station
Schöftland Terminus	S14	Hirschthal towards Menziken
Location
- Location within Switzerland Location within Canton of Aargau

Schöftland Nordweg railway station (German: Bahnhof Schöftland Nordweg) is a railway station in the municipality of Schöftland, in the Swiss canton of Aargau. It is the penultimate station at the western end of the 1,000 mm (3 ft 3 3/8 in) gauge Schöftland–Aarau–Menziken line of Aargau Verkehr.

== Services ==
The following services serve Schöftland:

- Aargau S-Bahn S14: service every fifteen minutes to Schöftland, Aarau and Menziken.
