= Buchs railway station =

Buchs railway station could refer to:

- Buchs AG railway station in Buchs, Aargau, Switzerland
- Buchs SG railway station in Buchs, St. Gallen, Switzerland
