= Alu Menziken =

Swiss steel manufacturing company

Alu Menziken Extrusion AG
- Type: Private
- Predecessor: Gautschi & Jequier
- Founded: April 8, 1897; 129 years ago in Fleurier, Switzerland
- Founder: Alfred Gautschi
- Headquarters: Menziken, Switzerland (canton of Aargau)
- Owner: Mengtai Group; (2024–present)
- Number of employees: 500+ (2023)
- Website: www.alu-menziken.com/en/

Alu Menziken Extrusion AG (primarily referred to as Alu Menziken Group) is a Swiss steel manufacturing concern headquartered in Menziken, Switzerland which is specialized in producing semi-finished products and components made from aluminium.

== History ==
Alu Menziken is the holding company of the second-largest aluminium group in Switzerland. It was founded in 1897 by Heinrich Alfred Gautschi as the firm Gautschi & Jequier in Fleurier, became the Aluminiumwarenfabrik Gontenschwil AG in 1905 and was called Aluminium AG Menziken from 1946 to 1993. The takeover of ailing debtor companies in the 1930s, for example Sigg AG of Frauenfeld (household goods) in 1936, sped up the building of a group of companies. From the 1980s the company changed greatly, with divestments alongside purchases of companies in Switzerland and the United States, including in 1988 the die-casting foundry Injecta AG in Teufenthal, the second-largest employer in the Wynental after the Menziken group. In 1993 Aluminium AG Menziken was split into a holding company and three trading or producing companies (casting, aircraft material and semi-finished products). The Gautschi family remained the majority shareholder. In 1997 the previously loss-making subsidiary Sigg AG was sold. In 1999 the group had net sales of 386 million francs and 2,002 employees (500 in 1929).

In 2007, after 17 years in the hands of the Gautschi family, it was acquired by the Swiss industrial group Montana Tech Components. In November 2024, it was announced that the Chinese Mengtai group had acquired Alu Menziken.
