= Gautschi =

Gautschi is a surname. Notable people with the surname include:

- Daphne Gautschi (born 2000), Swiss handball player
- Georges Gautschi (1904–1985), Swiss figure skater
- Rolf Gautschi, Swiss curler
- Walter Gautschi (born 1927), Swiss-American mathematician
- Heinrich Alfred Gautschi (1871–1955), Swiss industrialist
