= Hunzenschwil railway station =

Railway station in Aargau, Switzerland

Hunzenschwil

General information
- Location: Hunzenschwil; Switzerland
- Coordinates: 47°23′18″N 8°07′32″E
- Owner: Swiss Federal Railways
- Line: Zofingen–Wettingen line
- Train operators: Swiss Federal Railways

Passengers
- 2018: 650 per weekday

Services
Preceding station	Aargau S-Bahn	Following station
Suhr towards Zofingen	S28	Lenzburg Terminus
Location
- Location within Switzerland Location within Canton of Aargau

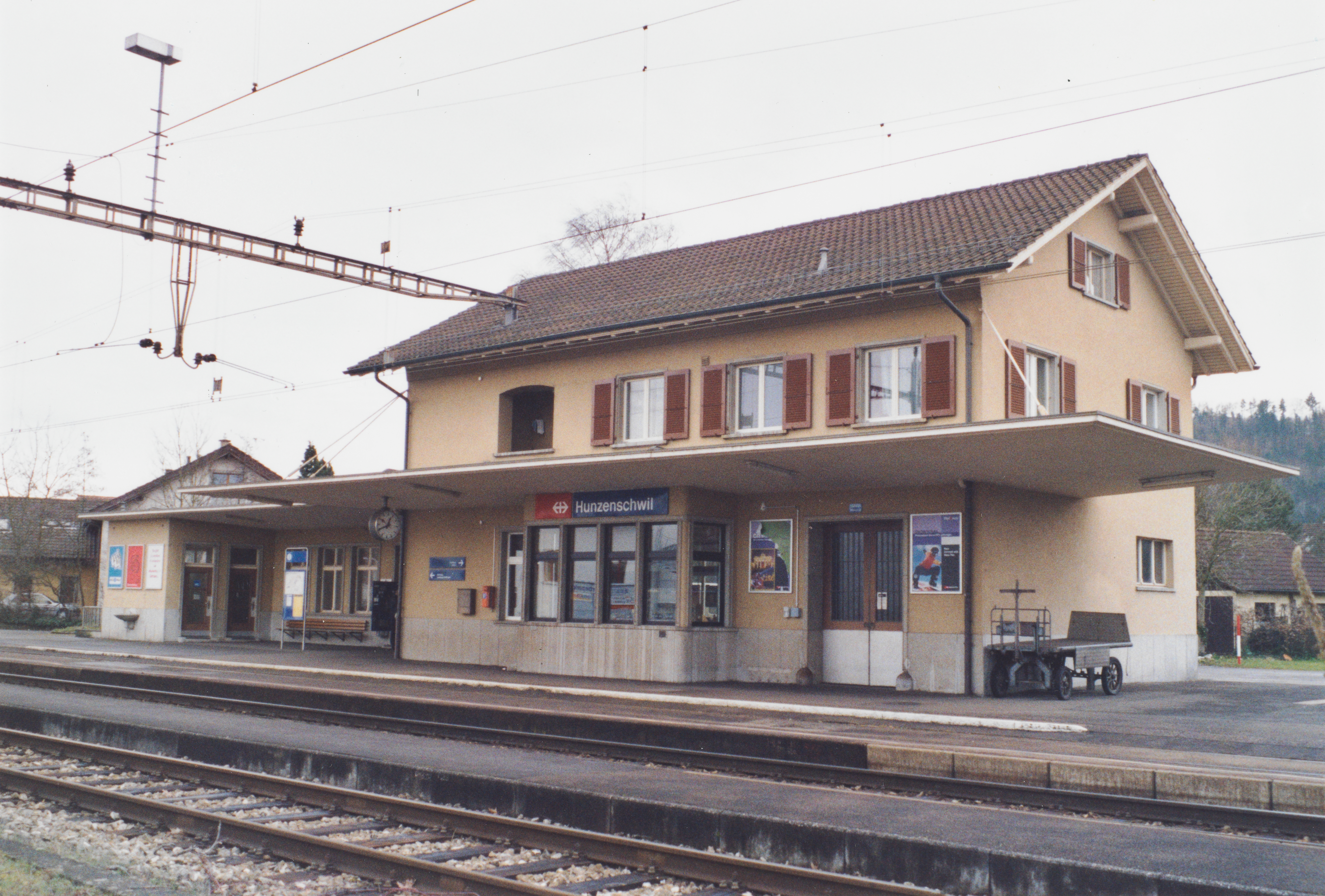

Hunzenschwil railway station (German: Bahnhof Hunzenschwil) is a railway station in the municipality of Hunzenschwil, in the Swiss canton of Aargau. It is an intermediate stop on the standard gauge Zofingen–Wettingen line of Swiss Federal Railways.

== Services ==
The following services stop at Hunzenschwil:

- Aargau S-Bahn S28: half-hourly service between Zofingen and Lenzburg.
