= Pfeffikon =

- Former municipality
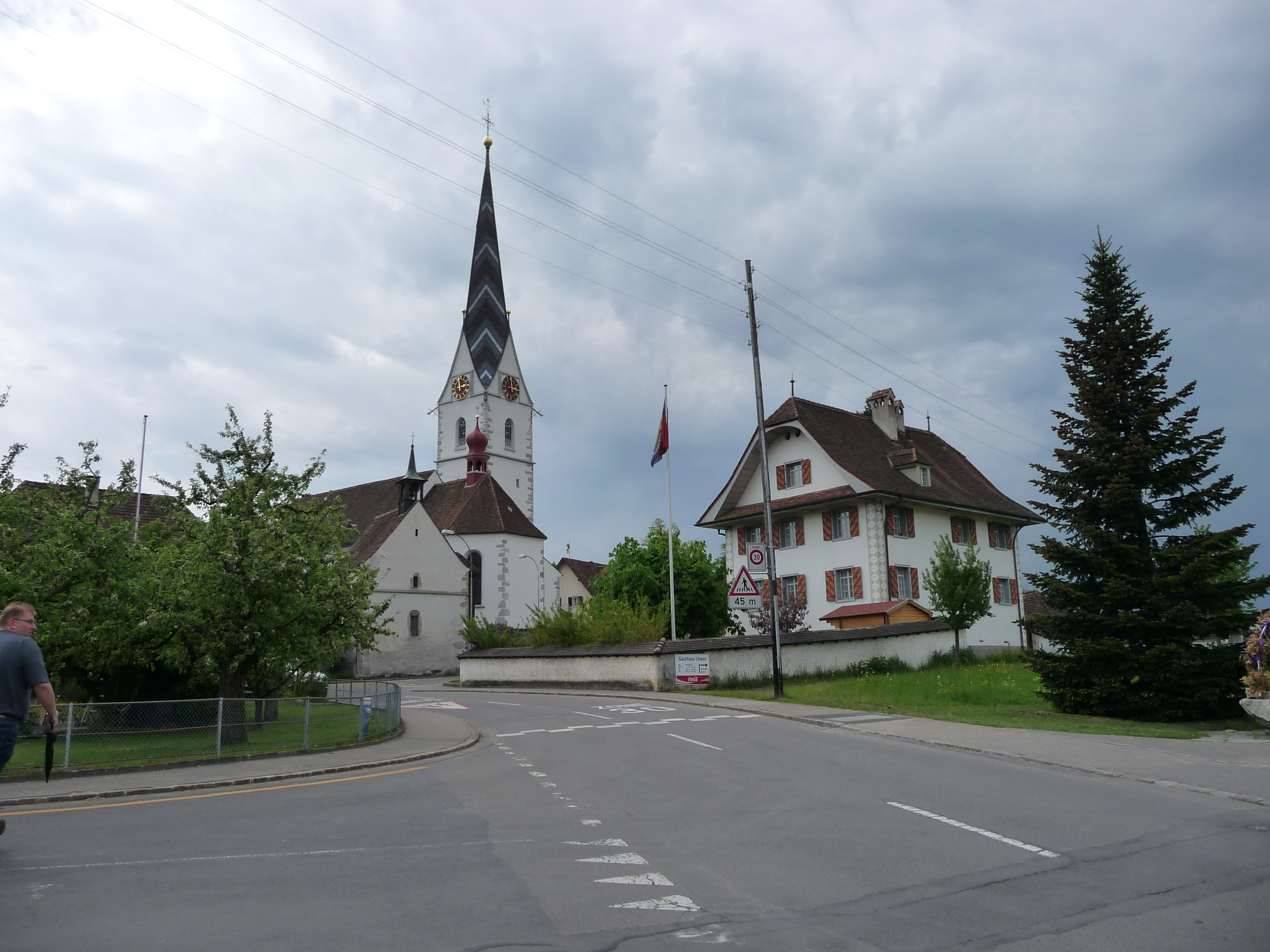

- Coat of arms
- Location of Pfeffikon
- Location within Switzerland Location within Canton of Lucerne
- Coordinates: 47°15′N 8°11′E
- Country: Switzerland
- Canton: Lucerne
- District: Sursee

Area
  - Total: 2.49 km^{2} (0.96 sq mi)
- Elevation: 542 m (1,778 ft)

Population (Dec 2010)
  - Total: 738
  - Density: 296/km^{2} (768/sq mi)
- Time zone: UTC+01:00 (CET)
  - Summer (DST): UTC+02:00 (CEST)
- Postal code: 5735
- SFOS number: 1096
- ISO 3166 code: CH-LU
- Surrounded by: Gontenschwil (AG), Menziken (AG), Reinach (AG), Rickenbach
- Website: www.pfeffikon.ch

Pfeffikon is a former municipality in the district of Sursee in the canton of Lucerne in Switzerland. On 1 January 2013 the former municipality of Pfeffikon merged into the municipality of Rickenbach.

== History ==
Pfeffikon is first mentioned in 1045 as Faffinchouen though this comes from a 14th Century copy of the original document. In 1173 it was mentioned as Phafinchon.

== Geography ==
Aerial view (1970)

Before the merger, Pfeffikon had a total area of 2.5 km^{2} (0.97 mi^{2}). Of this area, 38.9% is used for agricultural purposes, while 51% is forested. The rest of the land, (10.1%) is settled. In the 1997 land survey, 51.01% of the total land area was forested. Of the agricultural land, 35.22% is used for farming or pastures, while 3.64% is used for orchards or vine crops. Of the settled areas, 6.88% is covered with buildings, 0.81% is industrial, and 2.43% is transportation infrastructure.

The former municipality is located on the western slope of the Stierenberg in the upper Wynental and borders the Canton of Aargau on the north, east and south.

== Demographics ==
Pfeffikon had a population (as of 2010) of 738. As of 2007, 12.8% of the population was made up of foreign nationals. Over the last 10 years the population has decreased at a rate of -3.9%. Most of the population (as of 2000) speaks German (91.3%), with Albanian being second most common ( 2.9%) and Italian being third ( 1.7%).

In the 2007 election the most popular party was the SVP which received 35.2% of the vote. The next three most popular parties were the CVP (26%), the FDP (23.2%) and the SPS (7.7%).

The age distribution in Pfeffikon is; 162 people or 22.5% of the population is 0–19 years old. 136 people or 18.9% are 20–39 years old, and 261 people or 36.3% are 40–64 years old. The senior population distribution is 121 people or 16.8% are 65–79 years old, 34 or 4.7% are 80–89 years old and 6 people or 0.8% of the population are 90+ years old.

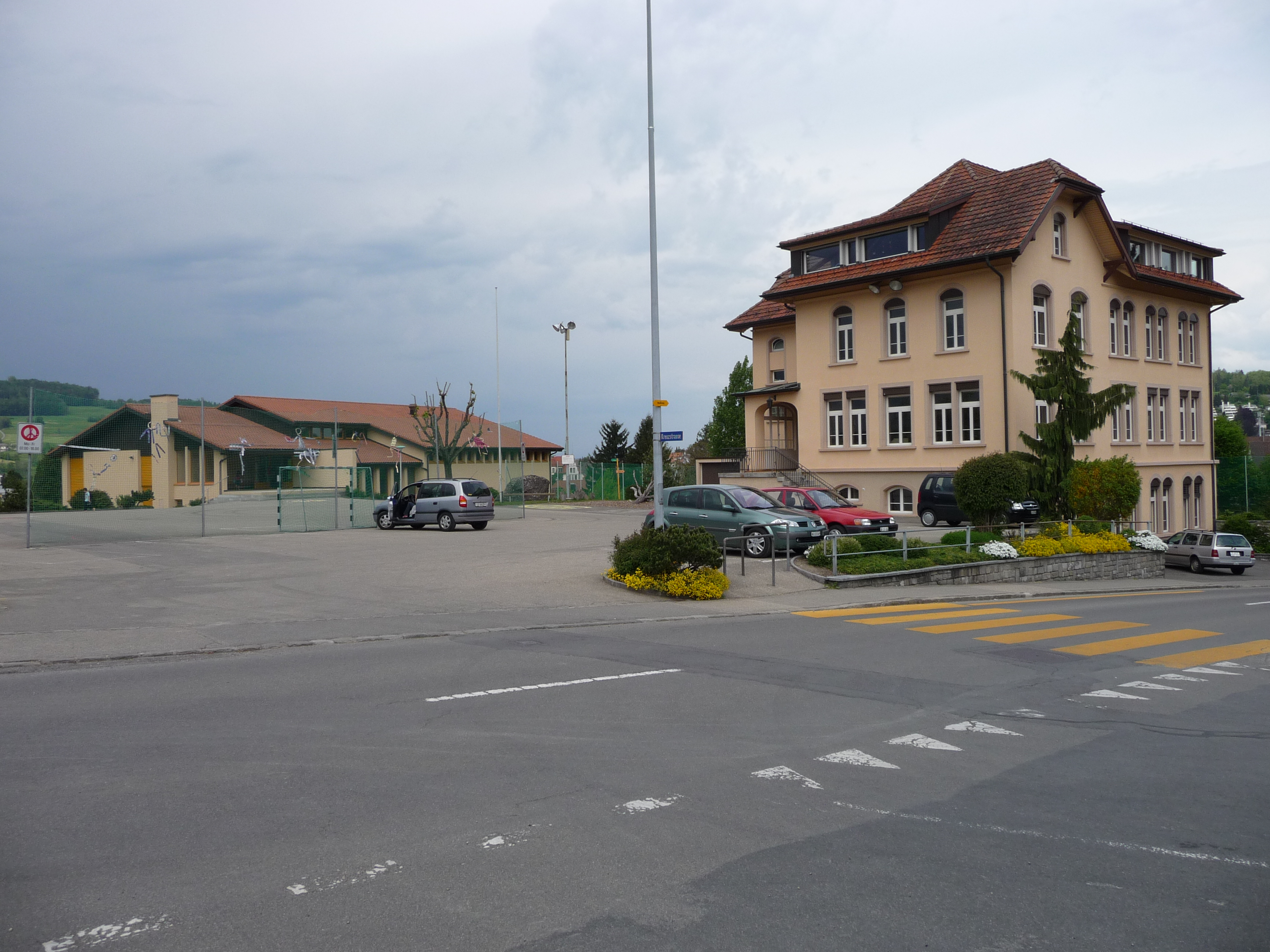
Pfeffikon school house

In Pfeffikon about 68.2% of the population (between age 25–64) have completed either non-mandatory upper secondary education or additional higher education (either university or a Fachhochschule).

As of 2000 there are 289 households, of which 95 households (or about 32.9%) contain only a single individual. 28 or about 9.7% are large households, with at least five members. As of 2000 there were 191 inhabited buildings in the municipality, of which 171 were built only as housing, and 20 were mixed use buildings. There were 131 single family homes, 21 double family homes, and 19 multi-family homes in the municipality. Most homes were either two (108) or three (41) story structures. There were only 17 single story buildings and 5 four or more story buildings.

Pfeffikon has an unemployment rate of 1.86%. As of 2005, there were 12 people employed in the primary economic sector and about 4 businesses involved in this sector. 236 people are employed in the secondary sector and there are 5 businesses in this sector. 26 people are employed in the tertiary sector, with 11 businesses in this sector. As of 2000 44.5% of the population of the municipality were employed in some capacity. At the same time, females made up 42% of the workforce.

In the 2000 census the religious membership of Pfeffikon was; 381 (55.5%) were Roman Catholic, and 198 (28.9%) were Protestant, with an additional 4 (0.58%) that were of some other Christian faith. There are 33 individuals (4.81% of the population) who are Muslim. Of the rest; there were 3 (0.44%) individuals who belong to another religion (not listed), 45 (6.56%) who do not belong to any organized religion, 22 (3.21%) who did not answer the question.

The historical population is given in the following table:

year	population
1456	ca. 110
about 1695	ca. 342
1850	496
1900	438
1950	527
2000	686

== Notable people ==
- Jorg Duss
