= Limmattal light rail line =

Light rail line in Switzerland

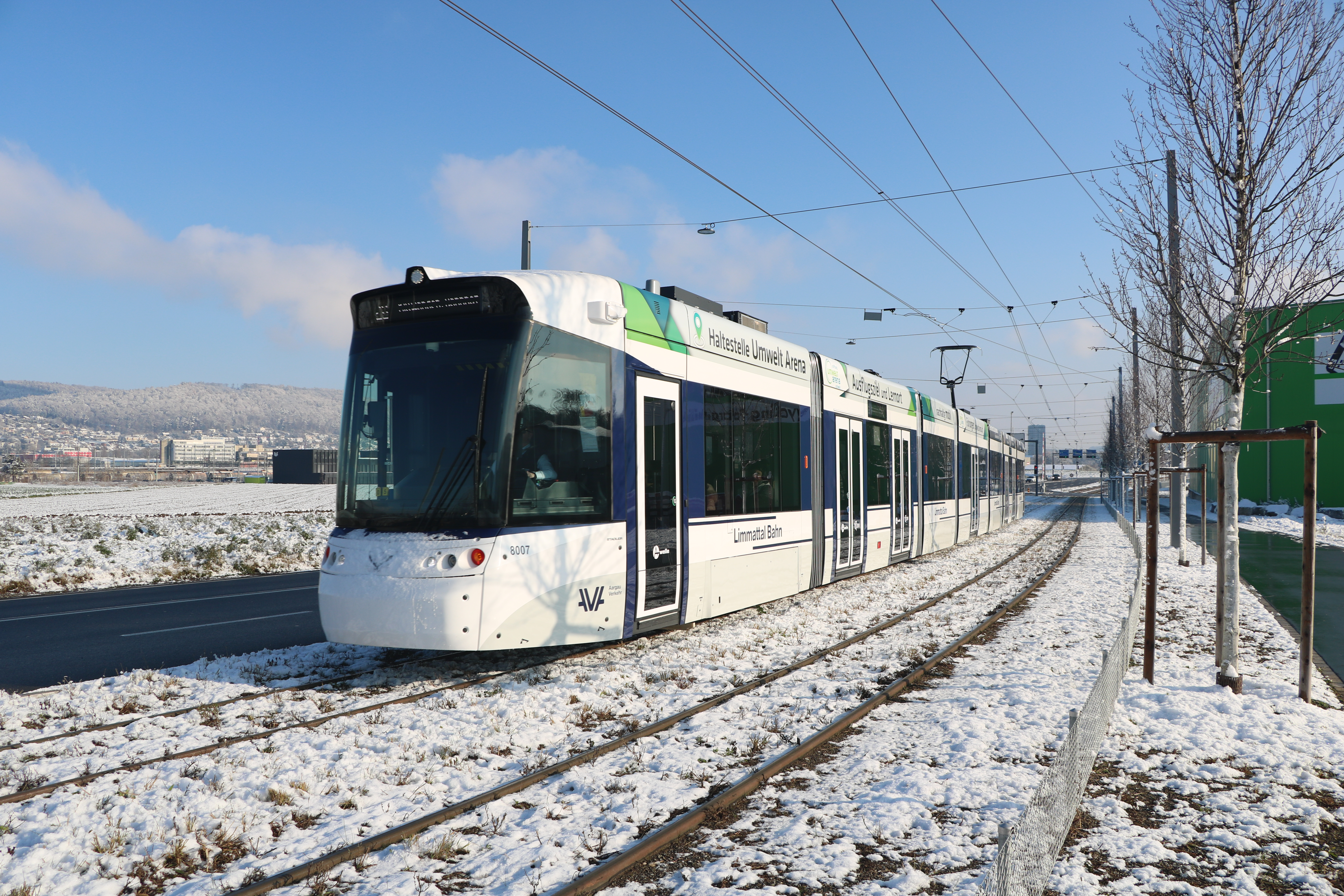
- Limmattalbahn line 20

Overview
- Native name: Limmattalbahn
- Status: Operational
- Owner: Limmattalbahn AG
- Termini: Zürich-Altstetten station; Killwangen-Spreitenbach station
- Stations: 27
- Website: https://www.limmattalbahn.ch/

Service
- Type: Light rail
- Operator: AVA AG

History
- Opened: 2 September 2019 (phase 1), 11 December 2022 (complete line)

Technical
- Line length: 13.4 km (8.3 mi)
- Number of tracks: Double
- Track gauge: 1,000 mm (3 ft 3 3/8 in) metre gauge
- Electrification: 600/1200 V DC
Route map
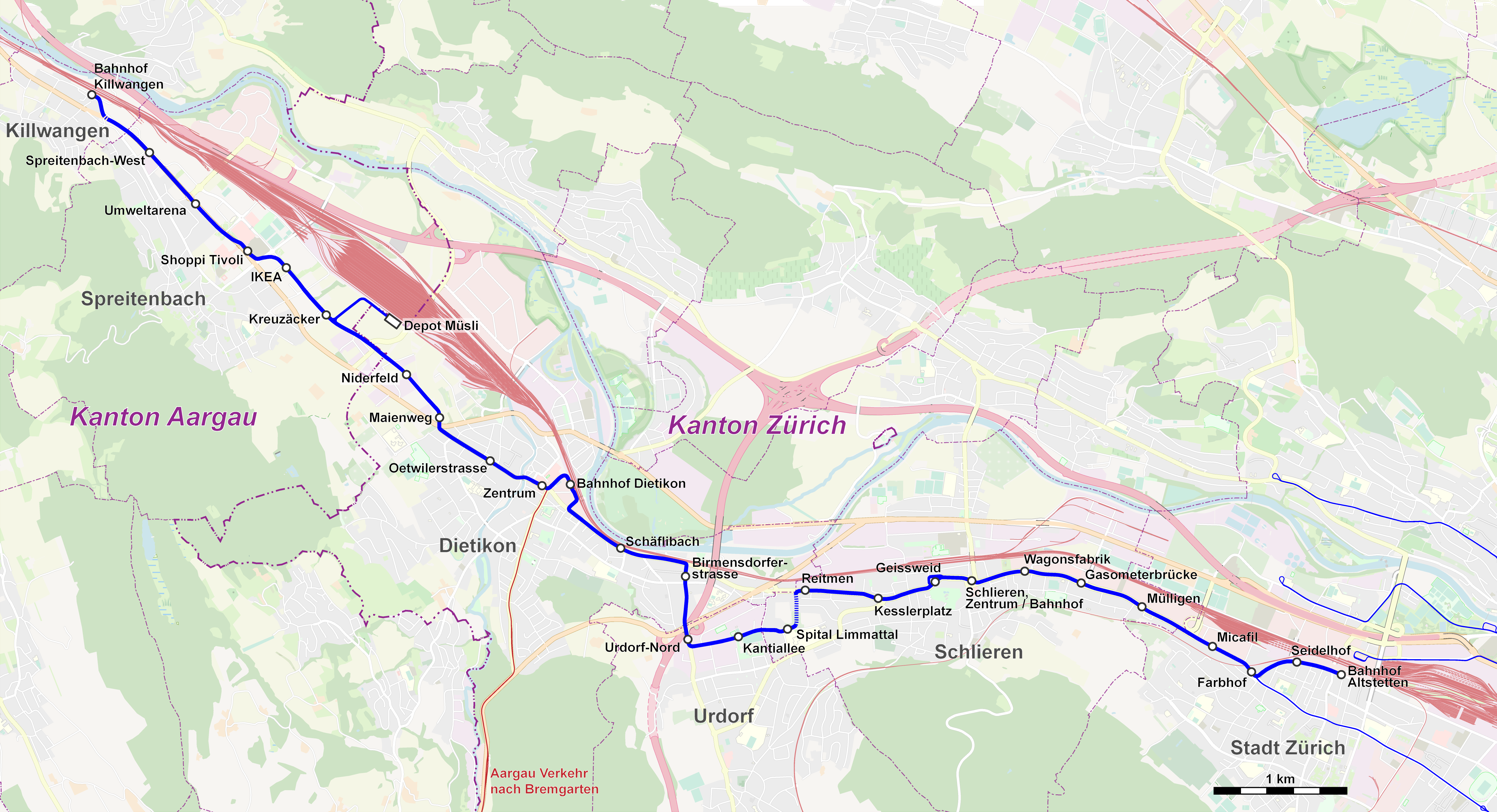

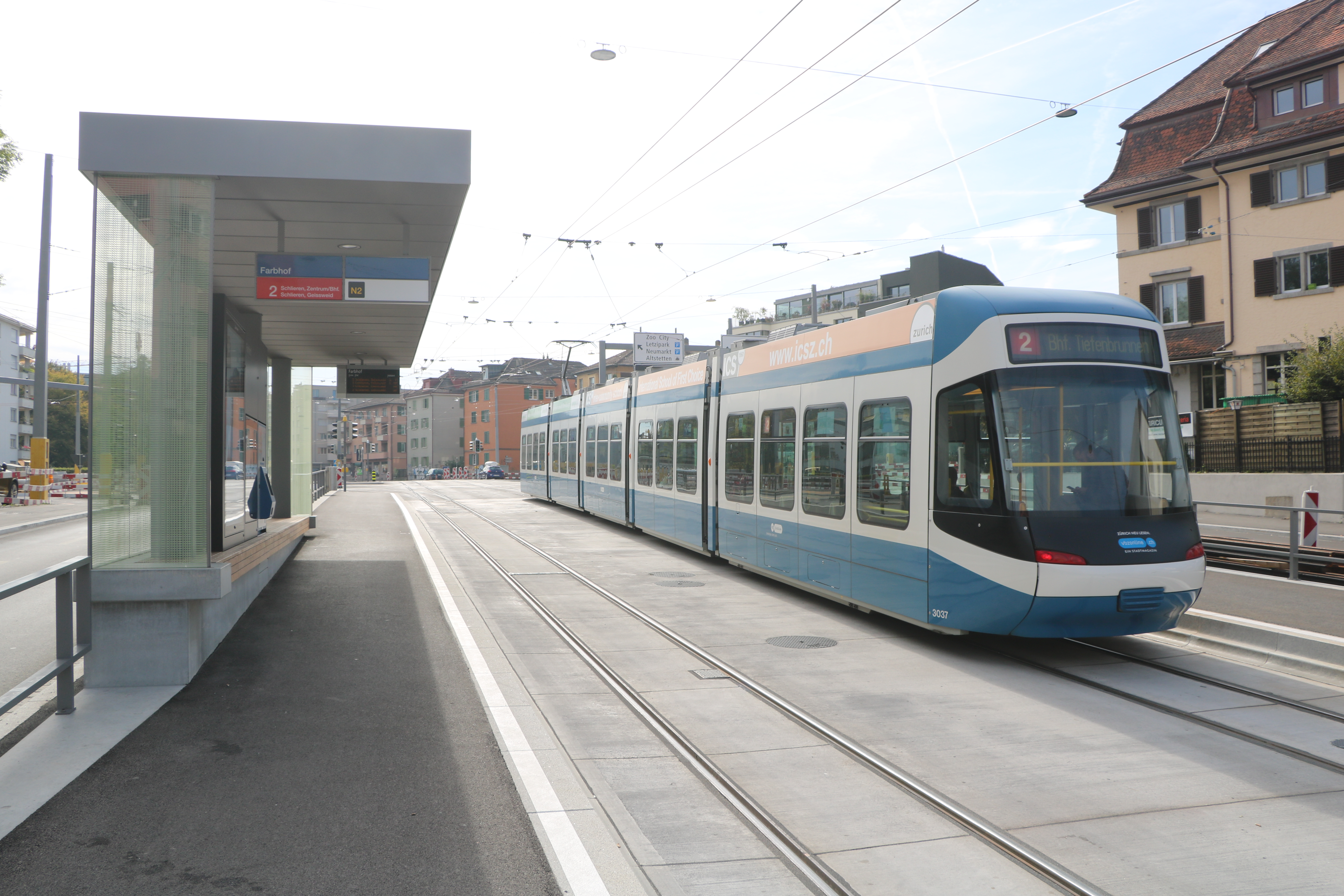
VBZ trams of line 2, here at the Farbhof stop, also use tracks of Limmattalbahn

The Limmattal light rail line (German: Limmattalbahn) is a metre gauge tram line in the Limmat Valley between Zürich Altstetten and Killwangen which started service in 2022. The line is 13.4 kilometres (8.3 mi) long and serves 27 stops. It is served by the lines 20 and 2 of the Zürich tram network. It is served by the Stadler Tramlink Be 6/8.

== History ==
The Limmat Valley is of primary historical importance for Swiss public transport as it is the location of the Spanisch-Brötli-Bahn, the first railway line of the country, operational since 1847. That line now carries long-distance passenger trains, freight trains and suburban trains of the Zürich S-Bahn. A light rail line, the Limmattal tramway, was operational since 1900, but closed in stages between 1928 and 1955, being replaced by buses. The success of the Glattalbahn suburban tram lines in the north-east of Zurich and the road system in the Limmat Valley running at capacity with projected 113,000 extra journeys a day by 2030 led to the development of the Limmattalbahn project.

Planning began in 2000, and by 2007 the line was included in the cantonal structure plans of the Canton Zürich and Canton Aargau. In 2010, the Limmattalbahn AG company was founded by the two cantons as a planner and projected operator of the infrastructure. After the project got the approval of the parliaments of both involved Cantons, a group of citizens from the Canton of Zurich gathered the 3'000 signatures by voting citizens necessary in order to enforce a referendum on the investment of CHF 510,3 Mio by the Canton. The citizens of the Canton of Zurich approved the investment in a November 2015 referendum.

In May 2016 it was announced that the line would be operated by BDWM Transport, now part of Aargau Verkehr, who also operate the Bremgarten–Dietikon line. Construction commenced in August 2017, and phase 1 between Farbhof and Schlieren opened in September 2019, operated by Verkehrsbetriebe Zürich and served by an extension of the existing tram line 2 from Zürich Tiefenbrunnen railway station at the shore of Lake Zurich. Line 20 of the Zurich tram network from Zürich Altstetten railway station to Killwangen-Spreitenbach railway station, operated by Aargau Verkehr, opened on 11 December 2022.

== Service ==
Trams on line 20 run every 15 minutes between Zürich-Altstetten and Killwangen-Spreitenbach stations. The line is double-track throughout, and over 90% segregated from road traffic. The stretch of the line between Farbhof and Schlieren is also in use by an extension of Zürich tram line 2 since 2019, running every 7.5 minutes and replacing the trolleybus line 31 on that stretch. (Although Line 31 still serves the stops at Seidelhof, Farbhof and Micafil on the route). The Limmattal and Bremgarten–Dietikon lines also share a short section of track in the centre of Dietikon.

Plans to increase the frequency of line 20 to every 7.5 minutes are under discussion, but cannot be realized before 2027 as more vehicles need to be acquired first to enable that cadence.

== Infrastructure ==
From Farbhof to Schlieren the line is electrified at 600 V DC for compatibility with the Zürich tram network, and the section of phase 2 between Altstetten and Farbhof is also electrified at this voltage. The rest of the line is electrified at 1200 V DC, which is also used by the Bremgarten–Dietikon line. A joint order, with Baselland Transport, was placed with Stadler for the supply of light rail vehicles to operate the service from Altstetten to Killwangen. The Limmattal portion of this order is for eight 45-metre (148 ft) long and 2.4-metre (7 ft 10 in) wide bi-directional Tramlink vehicles, with an option for up to eight more. The extension of Zürich tram line 2 is operated by the existing single-ended Zürich tram fleet, for which a turning loop has been provided at Schlieren.

The Federal Office of Transport granted authorization in 22 February 2020 for the construction of a depot for the line 20 at Müsli, between Dietikon and Spreitenbach. The depot provides parking space for up to 14 light rail vehicles. The facility also includes a building with a maintenance area and a washing facility.
