= Heinrich Alfred Gautschi =

Swiss industrialist and pioneer of aluminium technology

Alfred Gautschi
- Gautschi, c. 1954
- Born: Heinrich Alfred Gautschi; March 10, 1871; Menziken, Switzerland
- Died: March 21, 1955 (aged 84); Menziken, Switzerland
- Occupations: Industrialist; inventor
- Known for: Founding and leading Alu Menziken
- Spouse: Marie Louise Humbel (m. 1897)

Heinrich Alfred Gautschi colloquially Alfred Gautschi (German pronunciation: [ˈɡaʊtʃi]; GOW-chee; 10 March 1871 – 21 March 1955) was a Swiss industrialist and pioneer of aluminium technology. He was most notably known for founding Alu Menziken in 1897.

== Early life and education ==
Gautschi was born 10 March 1871 in Menziken, Switzerland, the older of two children, to Heinrich Gautschi, a factory foreman, and Maria Anna Gautschi (née Sommerhalder). He had a younger brother, Hermann Gautschi (1873–1940). After completing compulsory schooling, he completed a mechanic apprenticeship.

== Career ==
In 1897, he took-over a mechanical workshop in Fleurier, in which he produced metal products for saw mills and the watch industry. In 1899, after discovering the new material aluminium, he began to develop and research the product and produced pulleys for the watch industry. He soon received assignments to produce for the growing vehicle industry and opened an aluminium foundry. He began to specialize in aluminium and moved his company to Gontenschwil, a village near Menziken where he grew up. In 1905, he turned the former general partnership Gautschi & Jequier in a stock corporation now called Aluminiumfabrik Gontenschwil AG On April 15, 1905, he patented the so-called paper or book rolling process for aluminum foil. The process basically consisted of rolling a thin aluminum sheet, then dividing it in two halves, which were then stacked and rolled again. The process was repeated until a pack of 64 sheets of film was reached. The new type of foil was initially used primarily for packaging, replacing the tinfoil that had been used for a long time, i.e. rolled tin. The first major order included the monthly delivery of 1.6 million packs of snuff and came from Germany. The company founded by Gautschi still exists today and is part of the Alu Menziken Group, of which the Gautschi family was the majority shareholder until 2007. In 2007, the Gautschi family sold the majority of the Alu Menziken Group to Montana Tech Components AG.

== Personal life ==
In 1897, Gautschi married Marie Louise Humbel, who was from Boniswil and was the daughter of a cattle merchant. They had two sons and a daughter;

- Dr. Alfred Gautschi, Jr. (1899–1989), an economist, married Ada Bächtold, of Schleitheim, three sons. He presided Alu Menziken between 1955 and 1979.
- Rudolf Gautschi, married Elisabeth Hüssy, of Leimbach.
- Frieda Gautschi, married Jean Paul Meister (1906–1994), of Menziken, had three sons

Gautschi died 21 March 1955 aged 84 in Menziken.

== Literature ==
- Gautschi, Alfred: Die Aluminiumindustrie. Zürcher volkswirtschaftliche Forschungen 5. 120 S. und 5 Tafeln. Rechts- und staatswissensch aftliche Dissertation Universität Zürich. Rascher & Cie., Zürich. 1925
- Gautschi, Alfred [Hrsg.]: 50 Jahre Aluminium Menziken. Festschrift zur Feier des fünfzigjährigen Bestehens der Aktiengesellschaft 1905–1955. 142 S. zahlr. Abb. Aargau. 1955.
- Schuh, Günther, Thomas Friedli u. Michael A. Kurr: Prozessorientierte Reorganisation. 204 S. Carl Hanser Verlag, München/Wien. 2007. ISBN 978-3-446-40720-6
- Portmann, Paul Ferdinand: AG Sigg, Metallwarenfabrik, Frauenfeld. In: Thurgauer Jahrbuch 56:92-98. Huber Frauenfeld. 1981. ISSN 1420-3634
- Bahnmüller, Martin u. Peter Siegrist: 100 Jahre ALU Menziken – ein Jahrhundert Oberwynental : 1897–1997. 103 S. Menziken : ALU Menziken Holding. 1997. ISBN 3-9521405-0-3
