= BDWM Transport =

Transport company in Switzerland

BDWM Transport was a transport company in Switzerland, that operated regional rail and bus services in the cantons of Aargau and Zürich. The company was formed in 2000 by a merger of the Bremgarten–Dietikon railway (BD) and Wohlen–Meisterschwanden railway (WM) companies. The company merged with Wynental and Suhrental Railway to form Aargau Verkehr AG (AVA) in 2018. The company operated the following.

- The Bremgarten–Dietikon railway line (line S17 of the Zürich S-Bahn)
- The Wohlen–Meisterschwanden bus service
- The SBB bus Zofingen / Reiden
- The express bus Bremgarten / Busslingen–Zurich Enge
- The Limmat Bus AG

In May 2016 it was announced that the Limmattal light rail line, to be constructed in the densely populated Limmattal area to the west of Zürich, would be operated by BDWM. The line will connect Killwangen, Spreitenbach, Dietikon, Urdorf and Schlieren to Zürich-Altstetten railway station, with connection to the Bremgarten–Dietikon line at Dietikon and to Zürich tram route 2 at Farbhof.

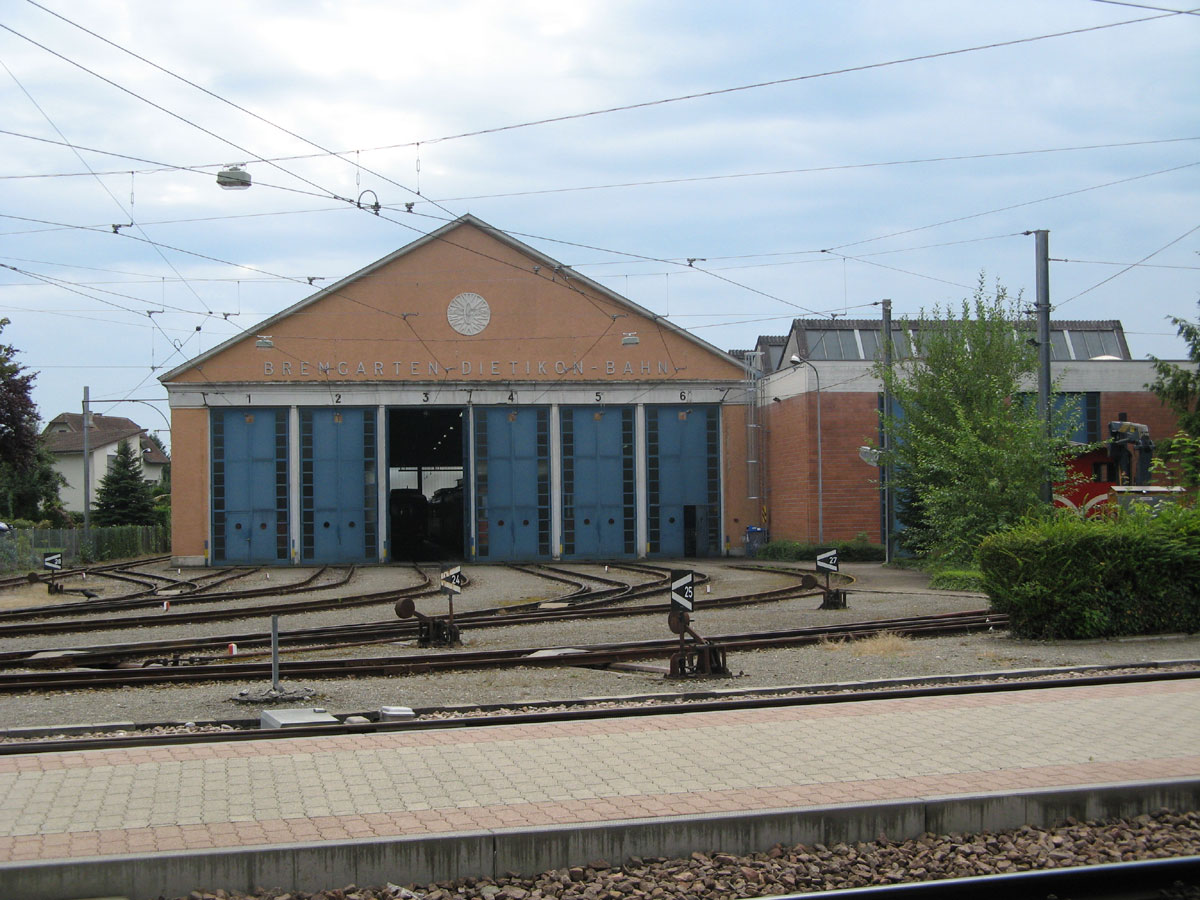
Bremgarten Depot BD

Construction was scheduled to start in 2017. The line opened in 2022.

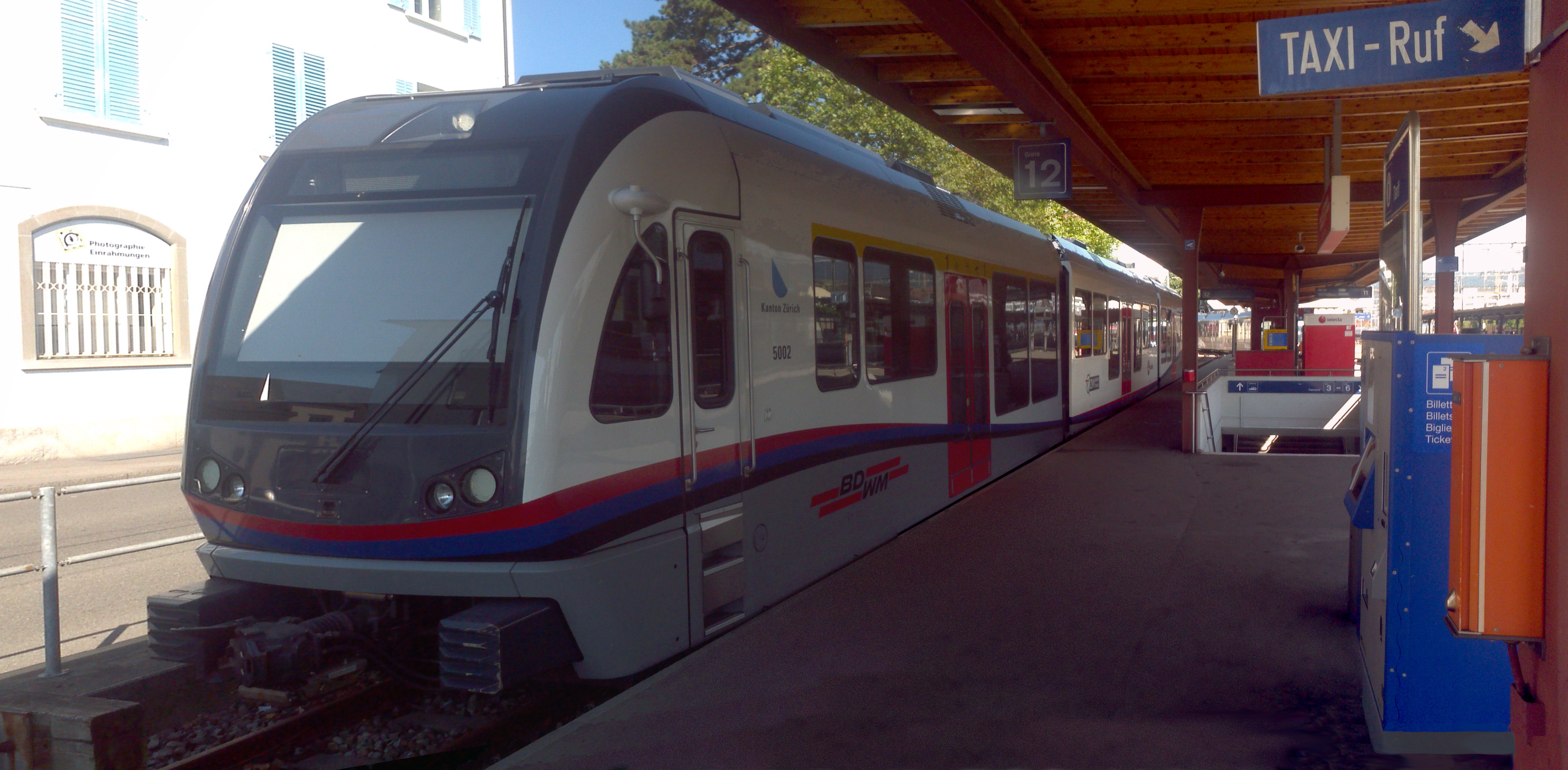
Station in Dietikon
