= Aarau–Suhr railway line =

Former railway line in Switzerland

Aarau–Suhr

Overview
- Status: Abandoned
- Owner: Swiss Federal Railways
- Termini: Aarau; Suhr

History
- Opened: 6 September 1877
- Closed: 11 December 2004

Technical
- Line length: 4.2 km (2.6 mi)
- Track gauge: 1,435 mm (4 ft 8 1/2 in) standard gauge
- Electrification: 15 kV/16.7 Hz AC overhead catenary

The Aarau–Suhr railway line was a standard gauge railway line in the canton of Aargau, Switzerland. It ran 4.2 kilometres (2.6 mi) from Aarau to Suhr, providing a connection between the Bözberg and Zofingen–Wettingen lines. The Swiss National Railway (SNB) opened the Aarau–Suhr and Zofingen–Wettingen lines on 6 September 1877. The line passed to Swiss Federal Railways in 1902. SBB electrified the line from Aarau to Zofingen via Suhr on 15 July 1946. SBB closed the line 11 December 2004 to permit the re-routing of the narrow gauge Menziken–Aarau–Schöftland railway line off surface streets. The rebuilt line opened on 22 November 2010.
