= Wynental and Suhrental Railway =

Former railway company in Switzerland

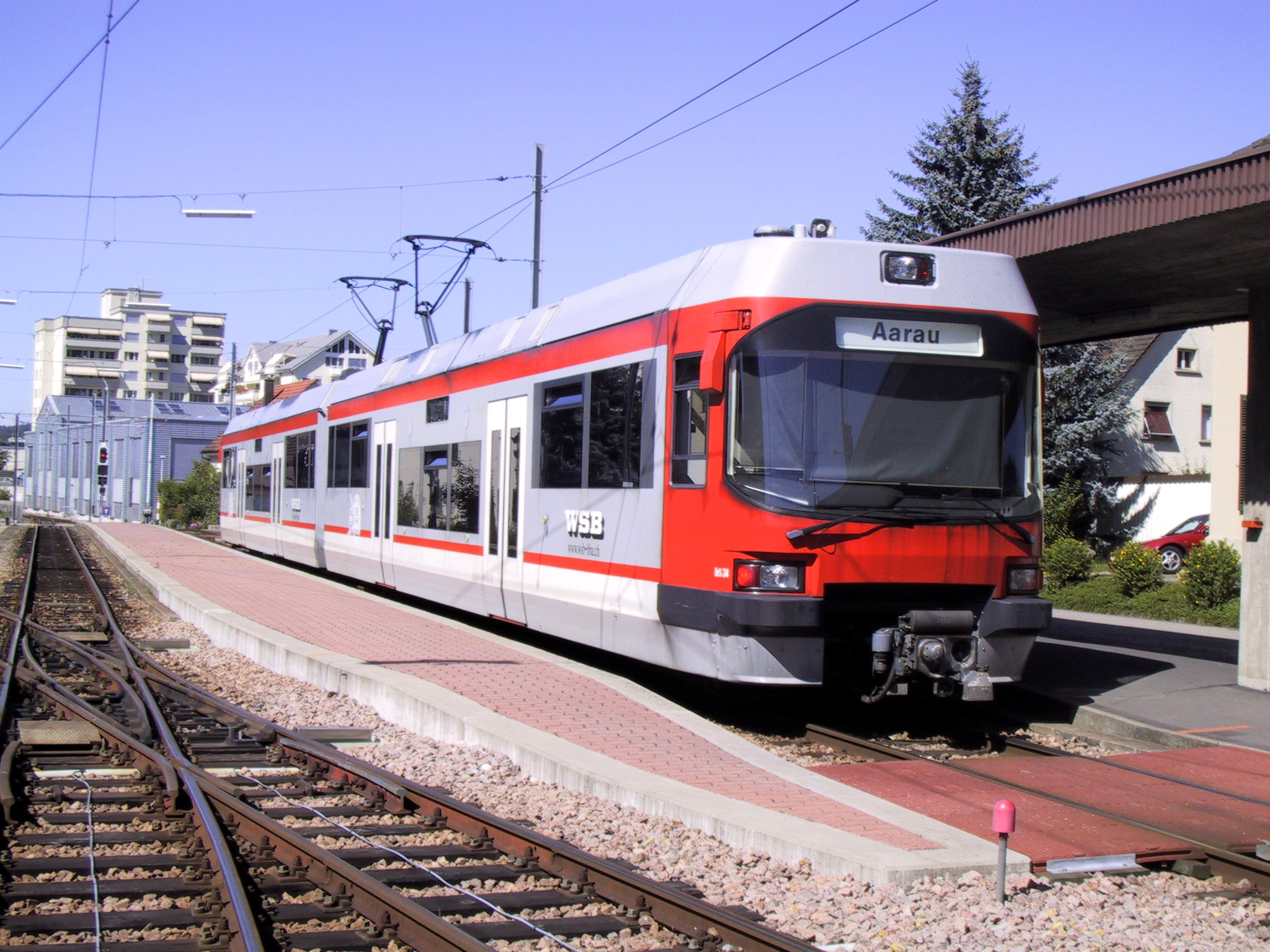
- Train carrying the WSB logo
- Native name: Wynental- und Suhrentalbahn
- Industry: Rail transport
- Predecessor: Aarau-Schöftland Railway; Wynental Railway
- Founded: June 24, 1958; 67 years ago
- Defunct: June 19, 2018
- Successor: Aargau Verkehr
- Headquarters: Aarau, Switzerland
- Area served: Canton of Aargau
- Services: Menziken–Aarau–Schöftland railway line

The Wynental and Suhrental Railway (WSB) (German: Wynental- und Suhrentalbahn, WSB) was a privately owned railway company in the canton of Aargau in Switzerland. It was formed by the merger of the Aarau-Schöftland Railway (German: Aarau-Schöftland Bahn, AS) with the Wynental Railway (German: Wynentalbahn, WTB) in 1958. It in turn merged with BDWM Transport in 2018 to form Aargau Verkehr (AVA).

The company owned and operated the Menziken–Aarau–Schöftland railway line, a metre gauge railway line from Menziken to Schöftland via Aarau. The line continues to run, under the ownership of Aargau Verkehr.

== History ==
=== The Wynental Railway ===
In 1871, several municipalities in the Wynental founded a committee requesting a concession for two railway lines, from Aarau via Oberkulm to Reinach, and from Beinwil am See via Reinach to Menziken. Both were planned as standard gauge lines operated with steam engines. A year later the project was granted by the authorities of the canton Aargau, but was not executed, mainly due to disagreements over the exact line through the narrow valley. Eventually the section between Beinwil am See and Menziken was built and opened in 1883 by the Seetal Railway (now SBB). Later on, this route was extended to Münster (today's Beromünster).

Eventually, the Wynental municipalities came to the conclusion that a narrow-gauge electric tram would be more economic. In January 1903 construction works were started. The opening of the Wynentalbahn (WTB) between Aarau and Reinach was on March 5, 1904, the extension to Menziken followed a few weeks later on 1 May. Originally the line had its starting point in the street on the north side of SBB's Aarau railway station. In 1924, the WTB opened its own station south of the SBB railway lines.

=== The Aarau-Schöftland Railway ===
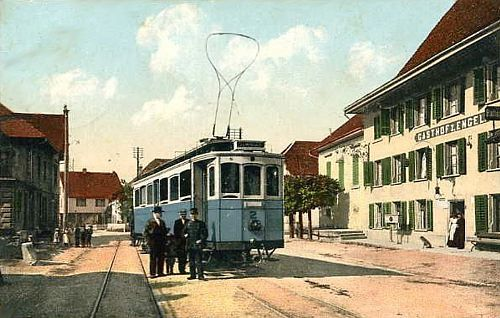
1905 AS Railcar in Oberentfelden

In the Suhrental too, there were thoughts about constructing a railway. Here, however, from the beginning on, a narrow gauge electrically powered line was planned, in the largest part of the route to be operated as a tramway. The project of the company Brown, Boveri & Cie (BBC) received the license and soon thereafter the construction works began. The Aarau-Schöftland Railway (AS) started operation on November 19, 1901. The planned extension of the AS from Schöftland to Triengen (connecting to the Sursee-Triengen-Bahn) was never realized.

Like the Wynental Railway, the Aarau-Schöftland Railway had its starting point in the street on the north side of SBB's Aarau railway station. When the Wynental terminus was moved south of the station, the connection between the two lines was lost.

=== The Wynental and Suhrental Railway ===
On 24 June 1958 the AS and WTB companies were merged to form the Wynental- und Suhrentalbahn (WSB). The new company faced two challenges; the fact that its two lines were not physically connected and the impact on services caused by increasing motor traffic interfering with its still largely street running tracks. The first step to address these came in 1967, when the former AS branch relocated from its city centre street track into a 260-metre (850 ft) tunnel leading to the former WTB station on the south side of the SBB station.

Elsewhere on the line, steps were taken to move the tracks away from the main roads. In the villages however, space was often limited, so the railway line had to be separated from the road completely. A main step was the complete change of the route in Gränichen, on the line through the Wynental, in 1985. Nevertheless, there were still many long stretches with tramway-like characteristics, in particular in Reinach and Menziken in the upper Wynental. In 1991, passenger traffic on the SBB line from Beinwil am See to Beromünster was abandoned, and plans were set for the relocation of the WSB route to the now vacant SBB route. The adaptation work started in 1999 after the cessation of freight traffic. The new section Reinach Nord - Menziken was finally opened on 15 December 2002.

On 5 December 2004, the line through Muhen, on the line through the Suhrental, was diverted away from the road. Between 2008 and 2010, the section of the Wynental line between Aarau and Suhr, which ran in the Kantonsstrasse K 242, was closed. It was replaced by a new route between the two places, operating on the right of way of the closed SBB standard gauge branch that roughly paralleled the former route. As part of this work, a new underpass was constructed to take the narrow gauge line under the SBB's Zofingen to Wettingen line and new platforms built at Suhr station providing direct interchange between the two lines. This section was operational on 22 November 2010.

=== AAR bus+bahn ===
In 2002, the WSB launched an umbrella brand, known as AAR bus+bahn, along with Busbetrieb Aarau (BBA), the local bus operator in the city of Aarau. Vehicles of both undertakings prominently displayed the AAR bus+bahn brand, displacing their own brandings. The two companies shared some senior managers, but remained legally distinct.

=== Aargau Verkehr ===
On 19 June 2018, the Wynental and Suhrental Railway merged with BDWM Transport (another narrow-gauge railway in the canton of Aargau) to form Aargau Verkehr. One of the consequences of this was the dissolving of the AAR bus+bahn umbrella brand, with Aargau Verkehr and Busbetrieb Aarau operating under their own brands and having their own management teams.

== Literature ==
- Peter J. Walker (1964). Rails through the Suhre and Wyna Valleys, Switzerland. London: Light Railway Transport League. OCLC 1138035921.
