= Menziken =

- Municipality
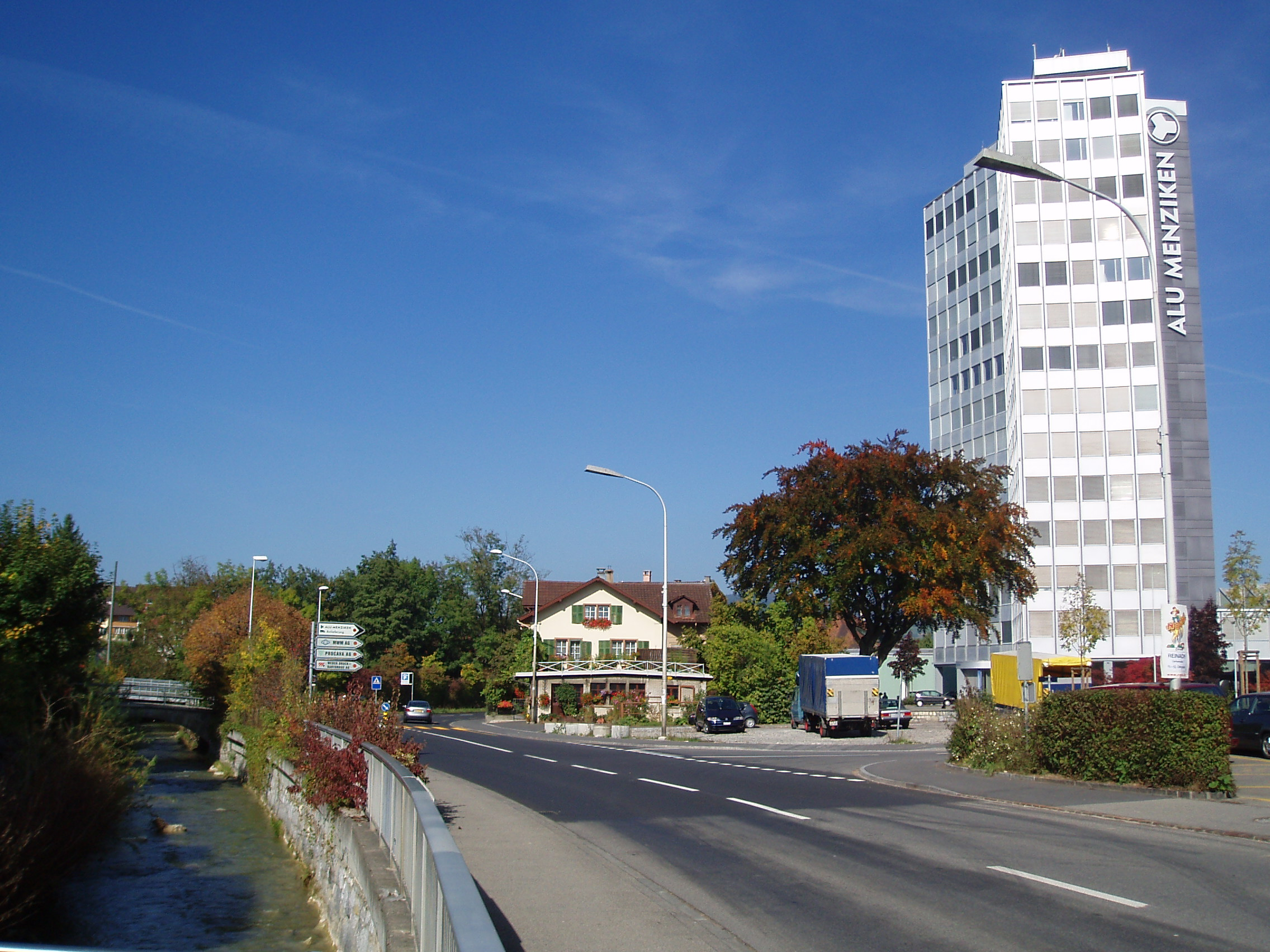

- Flag Coat of arms
- Location of Menziken
- Location within Switzerland Location within Canton of Aargau
- Coordinates: 47°14′N 8°12′E
- Country: Switzerland
- Canton: Aargau
- District: Kulm

Area
  - Total: 7.32 km^{2} (2.83 sq mi)
- Elevation: 544 m (1,785 ft)

Population (2006)
  - Total: 5,416
  - Density: 740/km^{2} (1,920/sq mi)
- Time zone: UTC+01:00 (CET)
  - Summer (DST): UTC+02:00 (CEST)
- Postal code: 5737
- SFOS number: 4139
- ISO 3166 code: CH-AG
- Surrounded by: Beinwil am See, Beromünster (LU), Burg, Gunzwil (LU), Pfeffikon (LU), Reinach, Rickenbach (LU)
- Website: www.menziken.ch

Menziken is a municipality in the district of Kulm in the canton of Aargau in Switzerland. On 1 January 2023 the former municipality of Burg merged to form the municipality of Menziken.

== History ==
Menziken is first mentioned in 1045 as Manzinchouen though that comes from a 14th-century copy of the original document. In 1295 it was mentioned as Menzchon. However, the current site of Menziken was settled earlier. Both Roman era ruins and Alamanni graves have been discovered in the municipality. During the High Middle Ages it was owned by the Counts of Lenzburg. In 1173 it passed over to the Kyburgs and following the extinction of the Kyburg line, in 1273 it passed to the Habsburgs. The Habsburgs held the rights to high justice while their vassals, the Lords of Reinach, held the rights to low justice. From the conquest of Aargau in 1415 until the creation of the Helvetic Republic in 1798, the village was under Bernese domination. At that time, Menziken belonged to the district (German: Oberamt) of Lenzburg. With the creation of the Canton of Aargau through the Act of Mediation in 1803, Menziken became a municipality in the new canton.

During the Middle Ages Menziken was part of the Catholic parish of Pfeffikon. Following the introduction of the Protestant Reformation in 1528, it was initially part of Gontenschwil parish and then of the parish of Reinach. It became the independent parish of Menziken-Burg in 1889–90, with the construction of its own church. The Catholic Menziken-Reinach Diaspora parish was created in 1906-07 when St Anne's Church was built in the municipality.

In 1729 a cotton factory was built in the municipality. This factory was followed by numerous weavers, spinners and dyers, which until the 19th century provided a major source of income. In 1838 Samuel Weber opened a cigar factory in the village which led to the cigar industry dominating the entire upper Wynental. The cigar companies represented a major employer until the second half of the 20th century. Major employers in the early 21st century include the Schlör AG (which had developed from the brewery founded in 1888 and today produce soft drinks, fruit and apple juice) and Alu Menziken, which produces metal goods. Since 1904 Menziken has been the terminus of the Wynental- und Suhrentalbahn.

== Geography ==
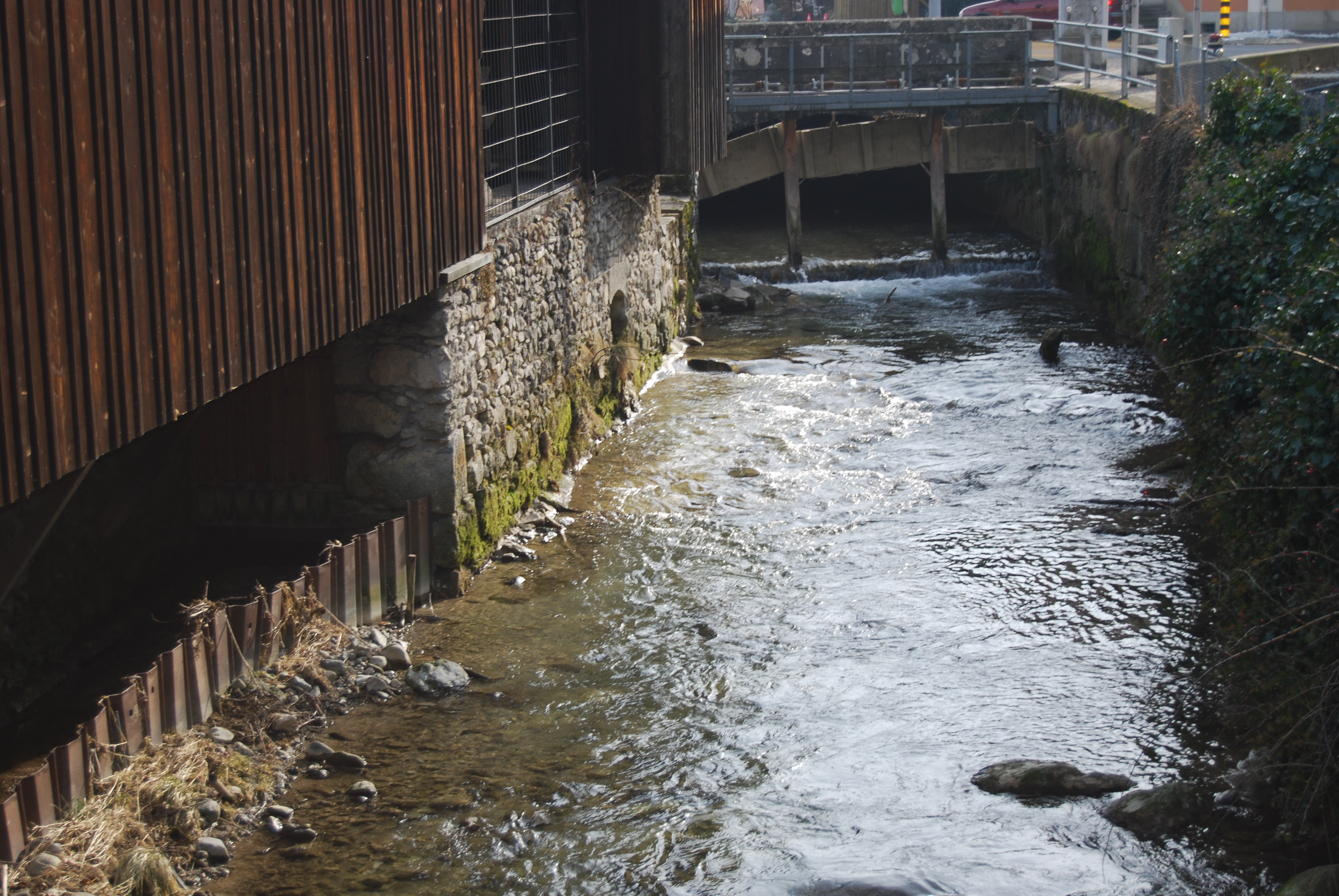
Wyna river at Menziken

Aerial view (1964)

Menziken has an area, as of 2009, of 6.39 square kilometers (2.47 sq mi). Of this area, 3.04 square kilometers (1.17 sq mi) or 47.6% is used for agricultural purposes, while 1.49 square kilometers (0.58 sq mi) or 23.3% is forested. Of the rest of the land, 1.87 square kilometers (0.72 sq mi) or 29.3% is settled (buildings or roads), 0.01 km^{2} (2.5 acres) or 0.2% is either rivers or lakes and 0.01 km^{2} (2.5 acres) or 0.2% is unproductive land.

Of the built up area, industrial buildings made up 2.8% of the total area while housing and buildings made up 17.1% and transportation infrastructure made up 4.4%. Power and water infrastructure as well as other special developed areas made up 2.7% of the area while parks, green belts and sports fields made up 2.3%. 21.8% of the total land area is heavily forested and 1.6% is covered with orchards or small clusters of trees. Of the agricultural land, 29.9% is used for growing crops and 16.6% is pastures, while 1.1% is used for orchards or vine crops. All the water in the municipality is in rivers and streams.

The municipality is located in the Kulm district. Menziken, together with Reinach Burg and Pfeffikon in the Canton of Lucerne, forms an agglomeration in the upper Wynental (Wyna River valley).

== Coat of arms ==
The blazon of the municipal coat of arms is Gules a Soldier Armoured and with Helmet Argent looking to sinister standing on Coupeaux Vert holding in dexter a Spear Or topped of the second and in sinister a Mullet of Five of the fourth.

== Demographics ==
Menziken has a population (as of December 2020) of 6,518. As of June 2009, 34.4% of the population are foreign nationals. Over the last 10 years (1997–2007) the population has changed at a rate of 1.8%. Most of the population (as of 2000) speaks German (81.3%), with Albanian being second most common ( 5.0%) and Serbo-Croatian being third ( 4.1%).

The age distribution, as of 2008, in Menziken is; 568 children or 10.4% of the population are between 0 and 9 years old and 780 teenagers or 14.3% are between 10 and 19. Of the adult population, 658 people or 12.0% of the population are between 20 and 29 years old. 710 people or 13.0% are between 30 and 39, 911 people or 16.7% are between 40 and 49, and 671 people or 12.3% are between 50 and 59. The senior population distribution is 560 people or 10.3% of the population are between 60 and 69 years old, 356 people or 6.5% are between 70 and 79, there are 220 people or 4.0% who are between 80 and 89, and there are 27 people or 0.5% who are 90 and older.

As of 2000 the average number of residents per living room was 0.59 which is about equal to the cantonal average of 0.57 per room. In this case, a room is defined as space of a housing unit of at least 4 m^{2} (43 sq ft) as normal bedrooms, dining rooms, living rooms, kitchens and habitable cellars and attics. About 43.8% of the total households were owner occupied, or in other words did not pay rent (though they may have a mortgage or a rent-to-own agreement).

As of 2000, there were 211 homes with 1 or 2 persons in the household, 1,099 homes with 3 or 4 persons in the household, and 745 homes with 5 or more persons in the household. The average number of people per household was 2.50 individuals. As of 2000, there were 2,111 private households (homes and apartments) in the municipality, and an average of 2.5 persons per household. In 2008 there were 986 single family homes (or 40.4% of the total) out of a total of 2,442 homes and apartments. There were a total of 142 empty apartments for a 5.8% vacancy rate. As of 2007, the construction rate of new housing units was 4.2 new units per 1000 residents.

In the 2007 federal election the most popular party was the SVP which received 42.1% of the vote. The next three most popular parties were the SP (17.7%), the FDP (16.8%) and the CVP (6.1%).

In Menziken about 60.5% of the population (between age 25-64) have completed either non-mandatory upper secondary education or additional higher education (either university or a Fachhochschule). Of the school age population (in the 2008/2009 school year), there are 436 students attending primary school, there are 219 students attending secondary school, there are 95 students attending tertiary or university level schooling in the municipality.

The historical population is given in the following table:

Historical population
Year	Pop.	±%
1764	864	—
1850	1,921	+122.3%
1900	2,333	+21.4%
1950	3,377	+44.7%
2000	5,511	+63.2%

== Heritage sites of national significance ==
The Villa Mathys at Hofmattpark 1A is listed as a Swiss heritage site of national significance.

== Economy ==
As of 2007, Menziken had an unemployment rate of 2.69%. As of 2005, there were 28 people employed in the primary economic sector and about 11 businesses involved in this sector. 660 people are employed in the secondary sector and there are 50 businesses in this sector. 1,077 people are employed in the tertiary sector, with 139 businesses in this sector.

In 2000 there were 2,728 workers who lived in the municipality. Of these, 1,816 or about 66.6% of the residents worked outside Menziken while 1,296 people commuted into the municipality for work. There were a total of 2,208 jobs (of at least 6 hours per week) in the municipality. Of the working population, 7.7% used public transportation to get to work, and 52.1% used a private car.

== Transport ==
Menziken is served by the Aarau–Menziken railway line, operated by Aargau Verkehr, which carries service S14 of the Aargau S-Bahn. This provides a fifteen minute interval service to the cantonal capital at Aarau, and stops at Menziken station within the municipality,

== Religion ==
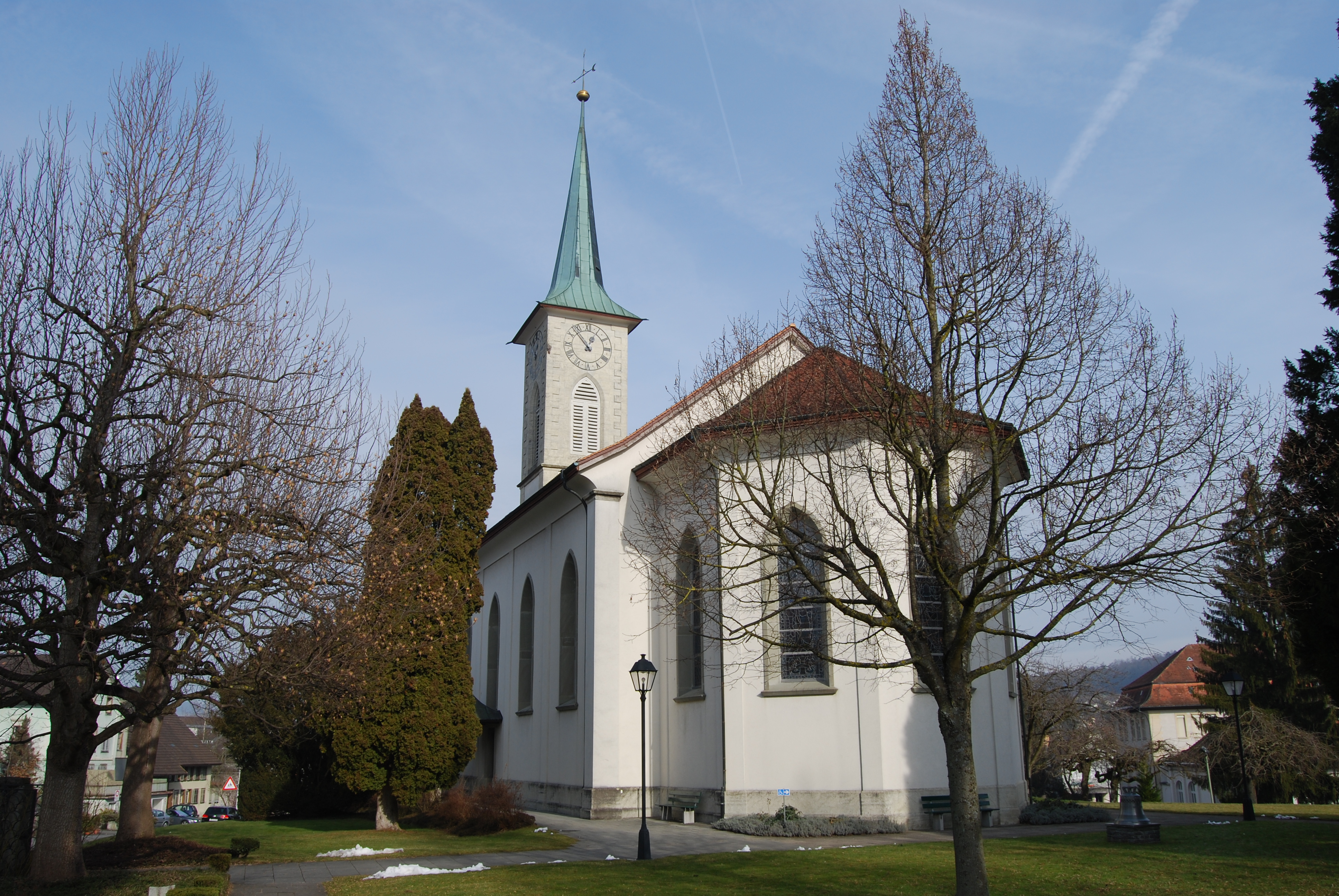
Protestant Church of Menziken

From the 2000 census, 1,673 or 30.4% were Roman Catholic, while 2,181 or 39.6% belonged to the Swiss Reformed Church. Of the rest of the population, there were 5 individuals (or about 0.09% of the population) who belonged to the Christian Catholic faith and a small congregation of Moravian Brethren.

== Notable people ==
- Bertrand Vogt (1857-1936)
