= Menziken railway station =

Railway station in Switzerland

Menziken
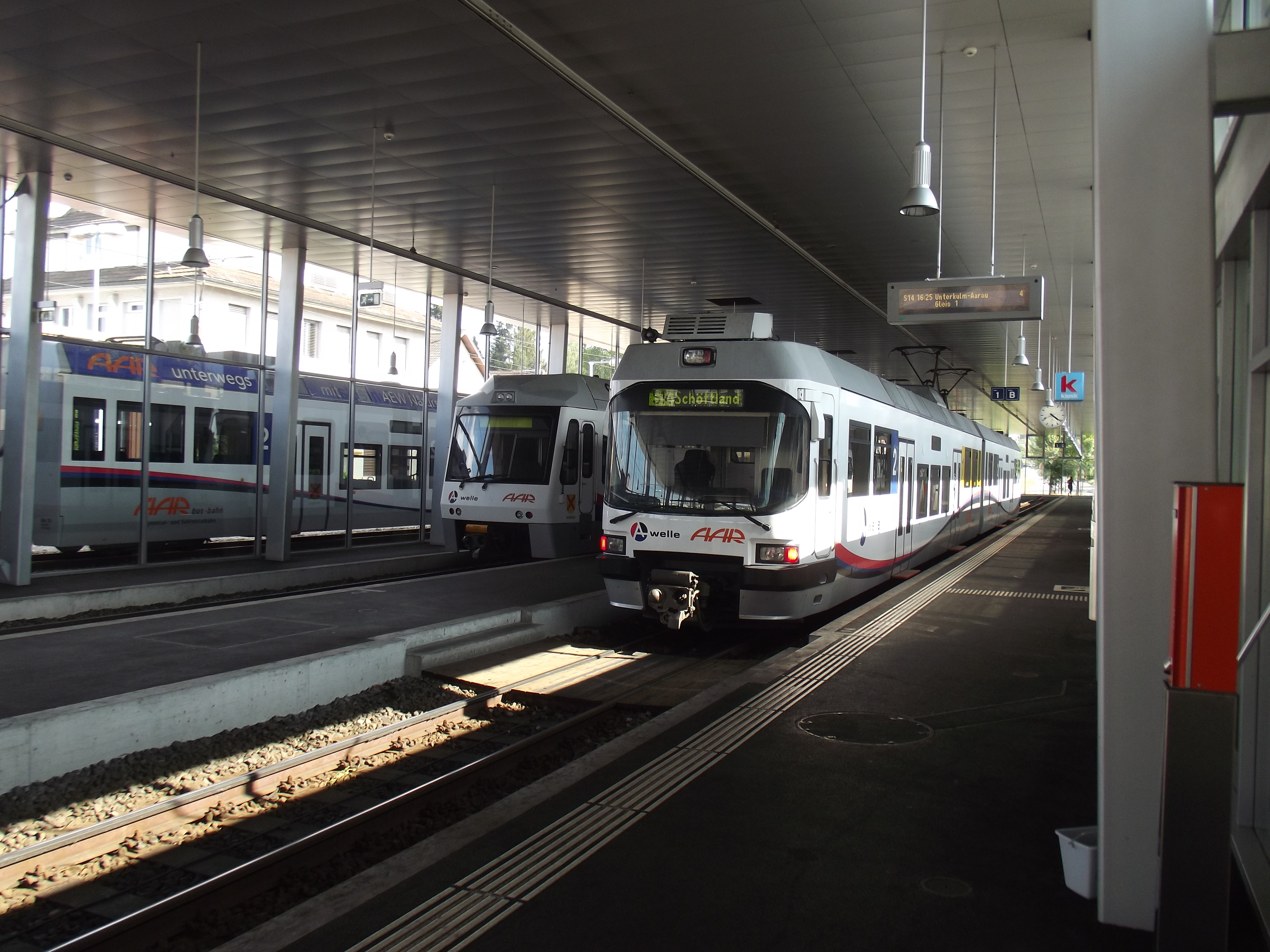
- Menziken railway station

General information
- Location: Menziken; Switzerland
- Coordinates: 47°14′28″N 8°11′20″E
- Owner: Aargau Verkehr
- Line: Schöftland–Aarau–Menziken line
- Train operators: Aargau Verkehr

Services
Preceding station	Aargau S-Bahn	Following station
Reinach AG towards Schöftland	S14	Terminus
Location
- Location within Switzerland Location within Canton of Aargau

Menziken railway station (German: Bahnhof Menziken) is a railway station in the municipality of Menziken, in the Swiss canton of Aargau. It is the eastern terminus of the 1,000 mm (3 ft 3 3/8 in) gauge Schöftland–Aarau–Menziken line of Aargau Verkehr.

== Services ==
The following services serve Menziken:

- Aargau S-Bahn S14: service every fifteen minutes to Aarau and Schöftland.
