= Schöftland–Aarau–Menziken railway line =

Narrow gauge railway line in Switzerland

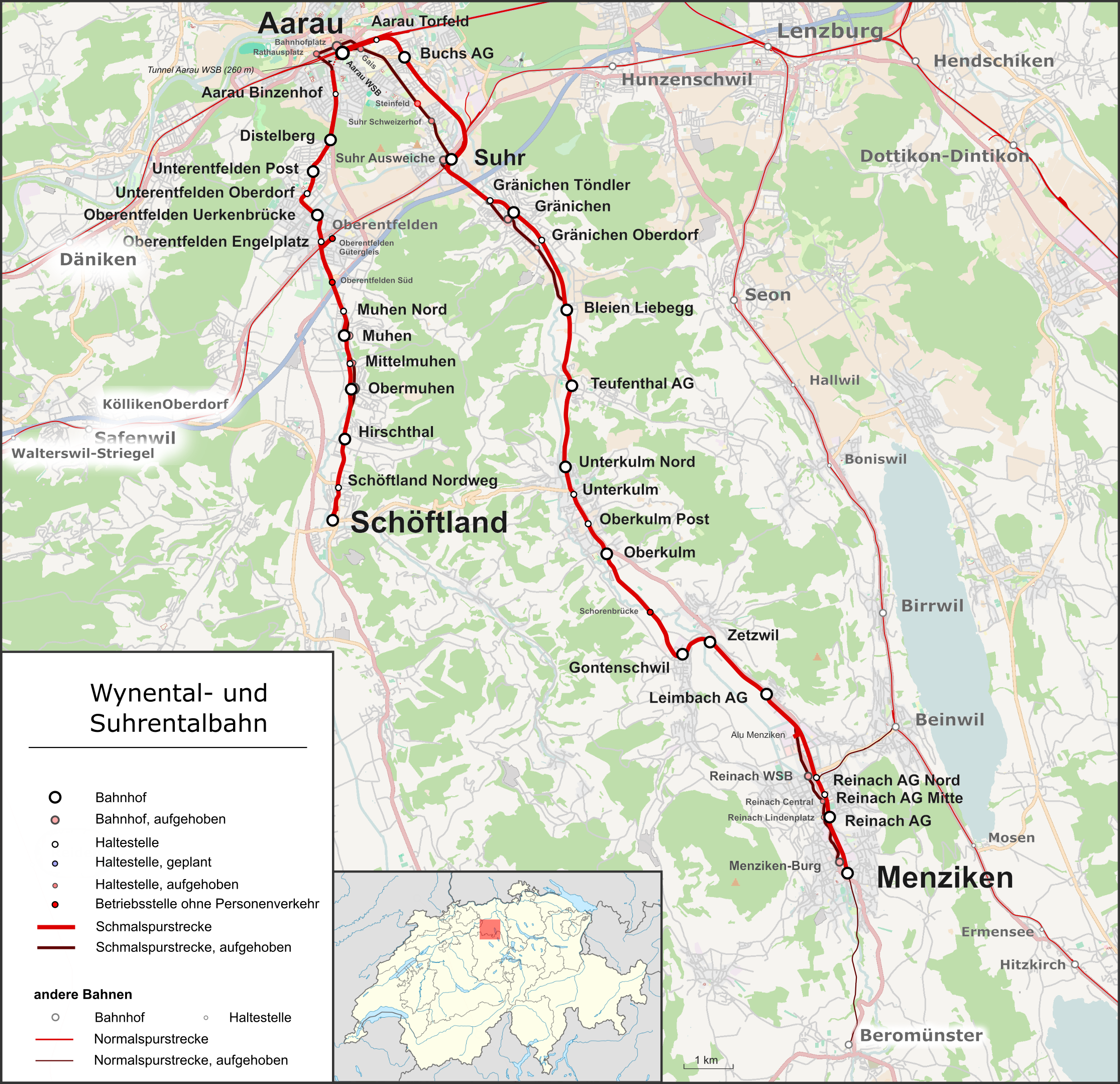

Overview
- Owner: Aargau Verkehr
- Locale: Canton of Aargau, Switzerland

Service
- Operator(s): Aargau Verkehr

Technical
- Line length: 32.3 km (20.1 mi)
- Track gauge: 1,000 mm (3 ft 3 3/8 in) metre gauge
- Minimum radius: 27 metres (89 ft)
- Electrification: 750 V DC
- Operating speed: 20 km/h (12 mph)- 80 km/h (50 mph)

The Schöftland–Aarau–Menziken railway line is a metre gauge railway line in the canton of Aargau in Switzerland. It provides a through service, in the form of an inverted 'V', from Schöftland to Menziken via Aarau. The two parts of the V were built separately, with the Aarau–Menziken railway line running through the Wynental, and the Aarau–Schöftland railway line running through the Suhrental.

The line is owned and operated by the Aargau Verkehr company, which also operates the Bremgarten–Dietikon railway line and a number of bus services. Until 2012, there used to be a limited freight service in the Wynental, mainly to the metal works of Alu Menziken, but today the line's sole usage is for passenger services, which are operated as Aargau S-Bahn route S14.

== History ==
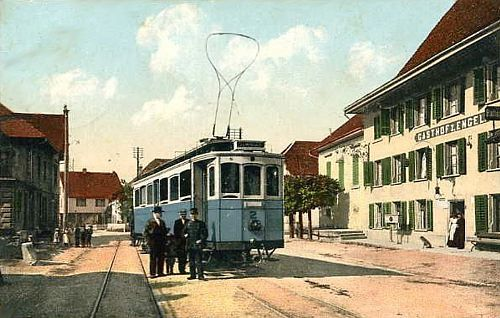
1905 AS Railcar in Oberentfelden

In 1871, several municipalities in the Wynental founded a committee requesting a concession for two railway lines, from Aarau via Oberkulm to Reinach, and from Beinwil am See via Reinach to Menziken. Both were planned as standard gauge lines operated with steam engines. A year later the project was granted by the authorities of the canton Aargau, but was not executed, mainly due to disagreements over the exact line through the narrow valley. Eventually the section between Beinwil am See and Menziken was built and opened in 1883 by the Seetal Railway (now SBB). Later on, this route was extended to Münster (today's Beromünster).

In the Suhrental too, there were thoughts about constructing a railway. Here, however, from the beginning on, a narrow gauge electrically powered line was planned, in the largest part of the route to be operated as a tramway. A company by the name of the Aarau-Schöftland Railway (AS) was created to operate the new line, and Brown, Boveri & Cie (BBC) received the license and soon thereafter the construction works began. The line started operation on November 19, 1901. The planned extension of the AS from Schöftland to Triengen (connecting to the Sursee-Triengen-Bahn) was never realized.

Meanwhile, the Wynental municipalities also came to the conclusion that a narrow-gauge electric tram would be more economic. A company by the name of the Wynental Railway (WTB) was created to operate the new line and in January 1903 construction works were started. The opening of the Wynentalbahn (WTB) between Aarau and Reinach was on March 5, 1904, the extension to Menziken followed a few weeks later on 1 May. Both lines had their starting point in the street on the north side of SBB's Aarau railway station. In 1924, the WTB opened its own station south of the SBB railway lines, whilst the AS continued running through the city streets to its stop on the north of the SBB station, thus meaning that the direct connection between WTB and AS was lost.

On 24 June 1958 the AS and WTB companies were merged to form the Wynental- und Suhrentalbahn (WSB) company. The new company faced two challenges; the fact that its two lines were not physically connected and the impact on services caused by increasing motor traffic interfering with its still largely street running tracks. The first step to address these came in 1967, when the former AS branch relocated from its city centre street track into a 260-metre (850 ft) tunnel leading to the former WTB station on the south side of the SBB station.

Elsewhere on the line, steps were taken to move the tracks away from the main roads. In the villages however, space was often limited, so the railway line had to be separated from the road completely. A main step was the complete change of the route in Gränichen, on the line through the Wynental, in 1985. Nevertheless, there were still many long stretches with tramway-like characteristics, in particular in Reinach and Menziken in the upper Wynental. In 1991, passenger traffic on the SBB line from Beinwil am See to Beromünster was abandoned, and plans were set for the relocation of the WSB route to the now vacant SBB route. The adaptation work started in 1999 after the cessation of freight traffic. The new section Reinach Nord - Menziken was finally opened on 15 December 2002.

On 5 December 2004, the line through Muhen, on the line through the Suhrental, was diverted away from the road. Between 2008 and 2010, the section of the Wynental line between Aarau and Suhr, which ran in the Kantonsstrasse K 242, was closed. It was replaced by a new route between the two places, operating on the right of way of the closed SBB standard gauge branch that roughly paralleled the former route. As part of this work, a new underpass was constructed to take the narrow gauge line under the SBB's Zofingen to Wettingen line and new platforms built at Suhr station providing direct interchange between the two lines. This section was operational on 22 November 2010.

On 19 June 2018, operation of the line was taken over by Aargau Verkehr AG (AVA), a company formed by the merger of the WSB with BDWM Transport, another narrow-gauge railway in the canton of Aargau.

== Route ==
Both branches begin in Aarau south of the SBB railway station. There is a separate station called Aarau WSB with an own station building and three passenger tracks.

The Wynental branch runs on the track of the former Swiss National Railway between Aarau and Suhr and underpasses the SBB railway line Lenzburg-Zofingen just before the station Suhr. It then follows the main road to Gränichen. In the village of Gränichen the WSB line runs about 100 meters away of the road - in earlier years the line was even on the road, which consistently lead to conflicts with the motor traffic. Further on, the line again follows the main road until Oberkulm, then separately to Gontenschwil and Zetzwil, again next to the main road until Reinach. Between Reinach and Menziken (the terminal station), the WSB line is now using a part of the track of the abandoned SBB line Beinwil am See - Beromünster (Seetalbahn).

The Suhrental branch first leads to a short tunnel, then follows the main road via Unterentfelden, Oberentfelden, Muhen, Hirschthal to Schöftland. At Oberentfelden, the WSB line crosses the SBB line Lenzburg-Zofingen on a level crossing. Also in Oberentfelden, there is still a small part on the road; in Muhen, the railway line has been diverted from the main road in 2004.

The main workshops are in Schöftland next to the passenger station.

== Operation ==
=== Service pattern ===
On workdays until 8 pm, and on Saturdays until 6 pm, there is a quarter-hourly service, in the evenings and on Sundays the trains run every half-hour.

=== Infrastructure ===
- whereof in tunnels: 0.26 km
- Maximum gradient: 4.5%

== Literature ==
- Peter J. Walker (1964). Rails through the Suhre and Wyna Valleys, Switzerland. London: Light Railway Transport League. OCLC 1138035921.
