= Aargau Verkehr =

Swiss transportation company

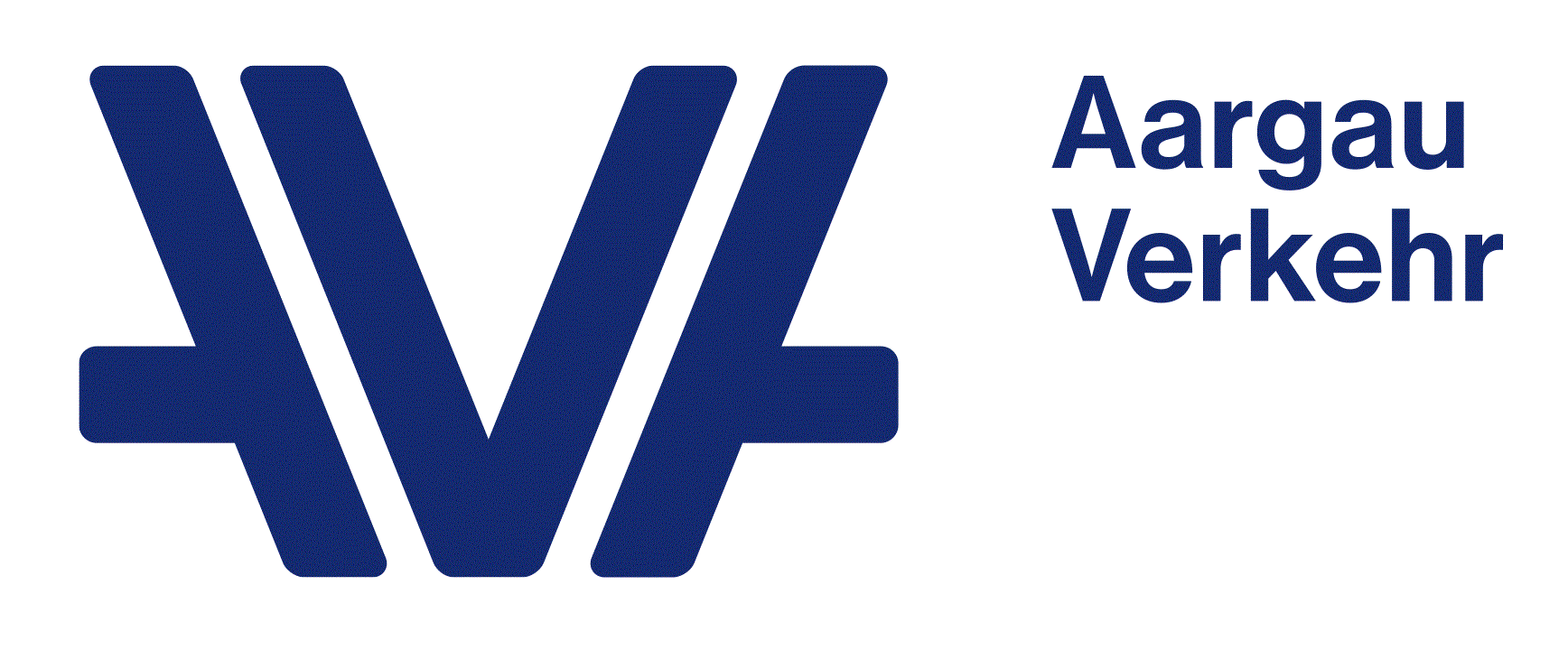

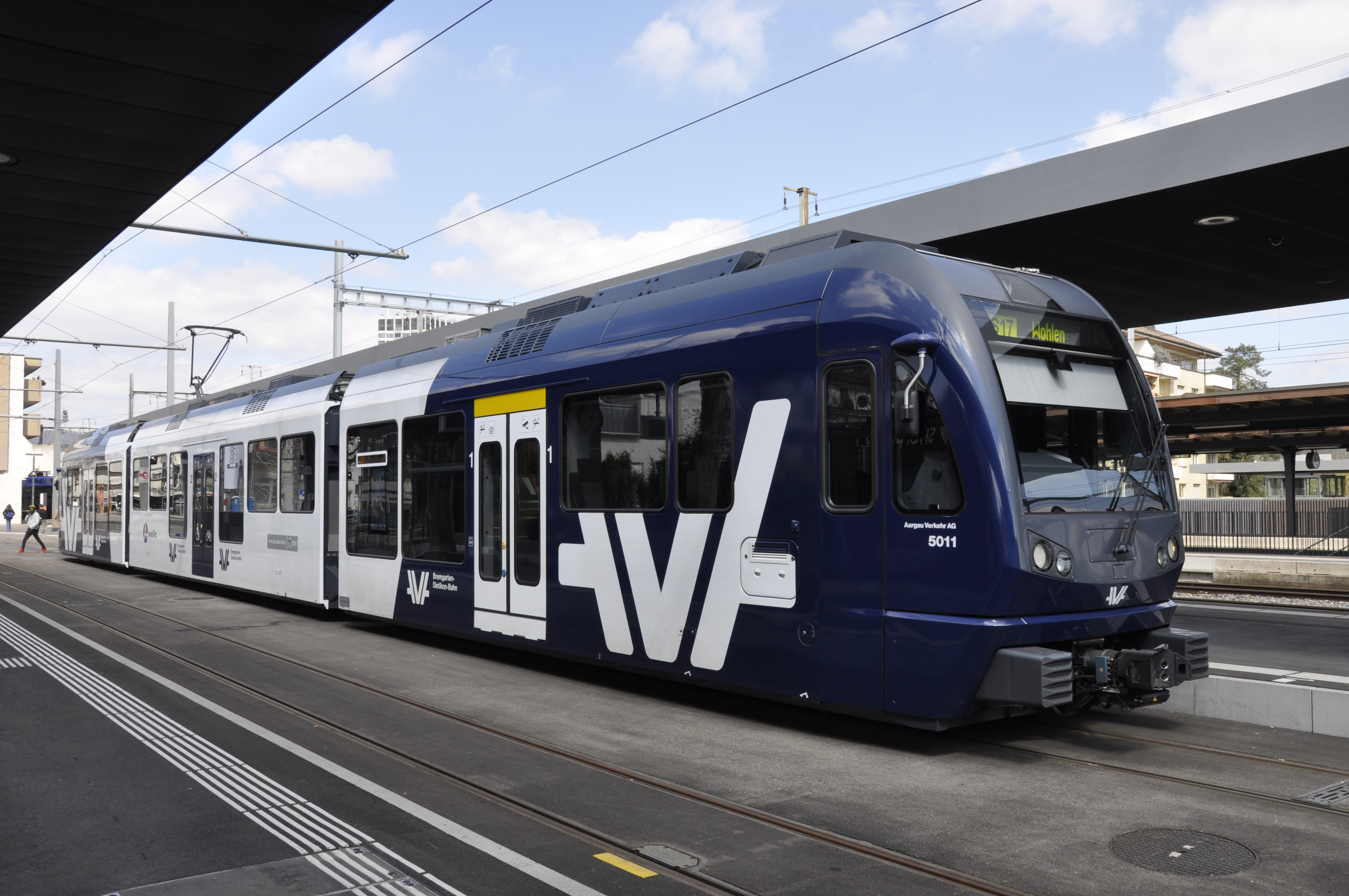
- An AVA ABe 4/8 Diamant on the Wohlen–Dietikon railway line in 2023
- Industry: Rail transport Bus transport
- Predecessors: BDWM Transport, Wynental and Suhrental Railway
- Founded: 19 June 2018; 7 years ago
- Headquarters: Aargau, Switzerland
- Area served: Aargau and Zürich regions, Switzerland
- Website: www.aargauverkehr.ch

Aargau Verkehr AG (AVA) is a Swiss transport company. It was formed on 19 June 2018 from the merger of BDWM Transport and the Wynental and Suhrental Railway. The new company operates both rail and bus services, with most of the latter being provided through its wholly owned subsidiary Limmat Bus AG.

Whilst based in the canton of Aargau, the company also operates public transport services in the cantons of Zurich and Lucerne.

== History ==
Aargau Verkehr formed on 19 June 2018 by the merger of BDWM Transport and the Wynental and Suhrental Railway. The meger led to the dissolving of the joint AAR bus+bahn brand that had previously united the Wynental and Suhrental Railway and the Busbetrieb Aarau.

== Routes ==
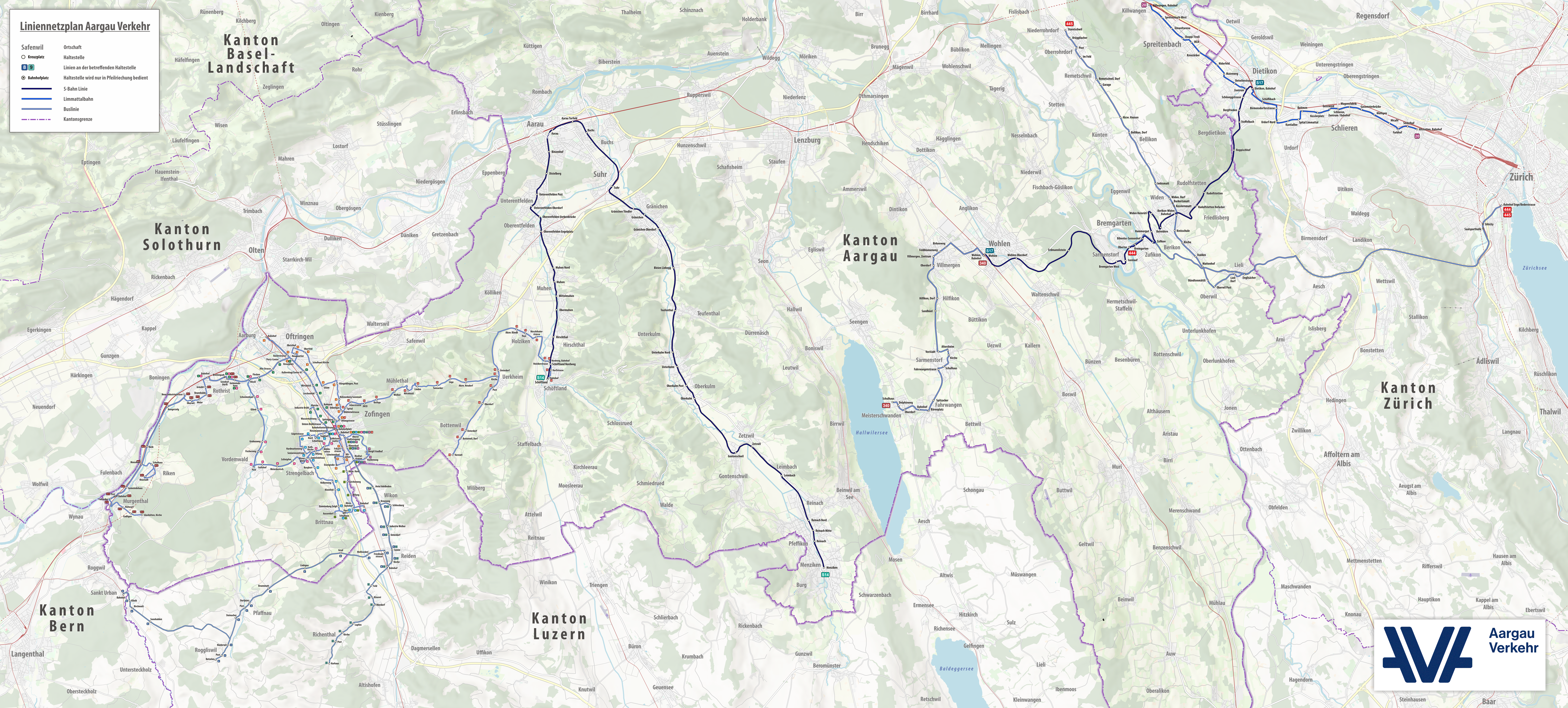
A map of services operated by AVA as of 2023

=== Rail routes ===
AVA operates the following railway lines, all 1,000 mm (3 ft 3 3/8 in) metre gauge:

Designation	Network	Name	Length	Termini		Status	Notes
S14	Aargau S-Bahn	Menziken–Aarau–Schöftland railway line	32.3 km (20.1 mi)	Schöftland	Menziken	Owned and operated	Inherited from predecessor Wynental and Suhrental Railway (WSB).
S17	Zürich S-Bahn	Bremgarten–Dietikon railway line	18.8 km (11.7 mi)	Wohlen	Dietikon	Owned and operated	Inherited from predecessor BDWM Transport.
20	Limmattalbahn		13.4 km (8.3 mi)	Zürich Altstetten	Killwangen-Spreitenbach	Contracted to AVA	Trams partially share tracks with Zürich tram route 2 and the Wohlen–Dietikon railway line.

=== Bus routes ===
AVA operates a number of bus routes under its own name:

- a network of 10 bus routes centred on Zofingen and Reiden
- route 340 from Wohlen to Meisterschwanden
- express route 444 from Bremgarten to Zürich
- express route 445 from Remetschwil to Zürich

The company also operates, through its wholly owned subsidiary Limmat Bus AG, a network of 10 bus routes between Zürich and Killwangen. These services are operated under contract to Verkehrsbetriebe Zürich (VBZ), and carry that organisation's brand rather than that of AVA.

== See also ==
- Transport in Switzerland
