= Dulliken railway station =

Railway station in Switzerland

Dulliken
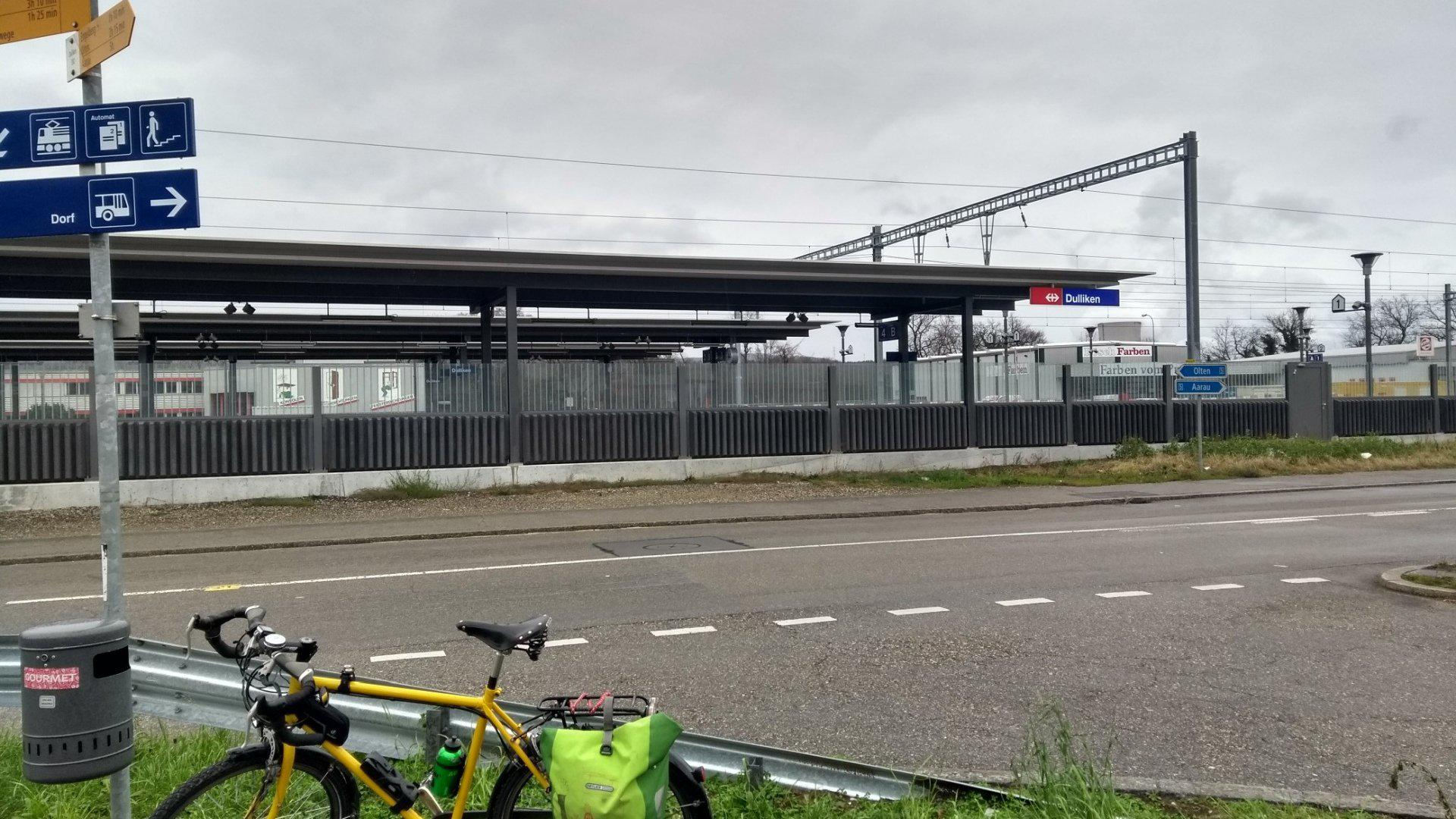
- The station in 2018

General information
- Location: Dulliken; Switzerland
- Coordinates: 47°21′N 7°57′E
- Owner: Swiss Federal Railways
- Line: Olten–Aarau line
- Distance: 42.9 km (26.7 mi) from Basel SBB
- Train operators: Swiss Federal Railways

Services
Preceding station	SBB CFF FFS	Following station
Olten Terminus	RE6 Limited service	Däniken towards Arth-Goldau
Preceding station	Aargau S-Bahn	Following station
Olten towards Langenthal	S23	Däniken towards Baden
Olten Terminus	S26	Däniken towards Rotkreuz
Preceding station	Zurich S-Bahn	Following station
Olten Terminus	SN11 Limited service	Däniken towards Winterthur
Location
- Location within Switzerland Location within Canton of Solothurn

Dulliken railway station (German: Bahnhof Dulliken) is a railway station in the municipality of Dulliken, in the Swiss canton of Solothurn. It is an intermediate stop on the Olten–Aarau line.

== Services ==
As of the December 2023 timetable change, the following services stop at Dulliken, including a nighttime services (SN11) offered by the Zürcher Verkehrsverbund (ZVV):

- RegioExpress RE6: three round-trips on weekends to Arth-Goldau.
- Aargau S-Bahn:
  - S23: hourly service between Langenthal and Baden.
  - S26: hourly service between Olten and Rotkreuz.
- Zurich S-Bahn:
  - SN11: on Friday and Saturday night, hourly service between Winterthur and Olten, via Zürich HB.

== See also ==
- Rail transport in Switzerland
