= Däniken railway station =

Railway station in Switzerland

Däniken
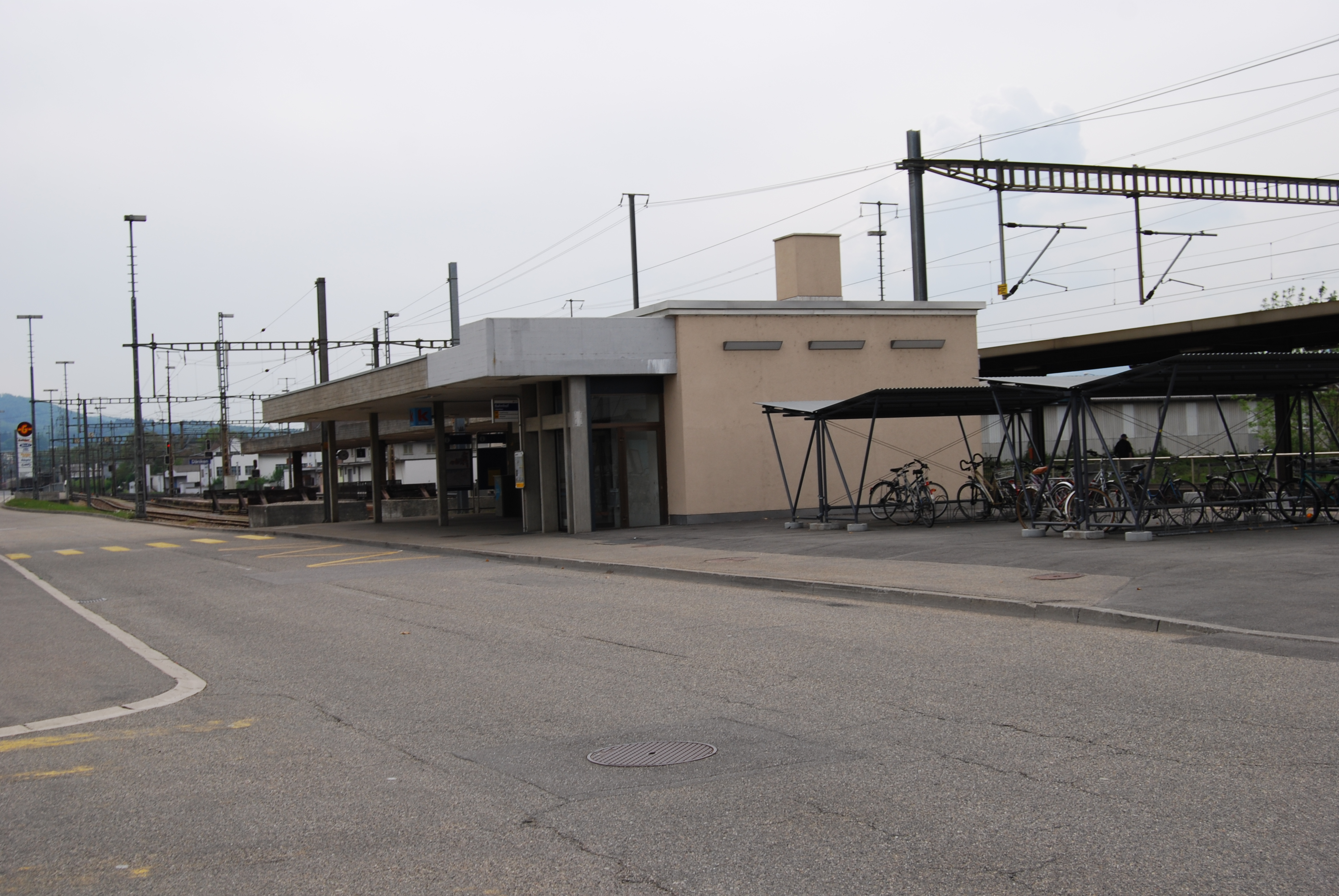
- The station in 2011

General information
- Location: Däniken; Switzerland
- Coordinates: 47°22′N 7°59′E
- Owner: Swiss Federal Railways
- Line: Olten–Aarau line
- Distance: 45.7 km (28.4 mi) from Basel SBB
- Train operators: Swiss Federal Railways

Services
Preceding station	SBB CFF FFS	Following station
Dulliken towards Olten	RE6 Limited service	Schönenwerd towards Arth-Goldau
Preceding station	Aargau S-Bahn	Following station
Dulliken towards Langenthal	S23	Schönenwerd towards Baden
Dulliken towards Olten	S26	Schönenwerd towards Rotkreuz
Preceding station	Zurich S-Bahn	Following station
Dulliken towards Olten	SN11 Limited service	Schönenwerd towards Winterthur
Location
- Location within Switzerland Location within Canton of Solothurn

Däniken railway station (German: Bahnhof Däniken) is a railway station in the municipality of Däniken, in the Swiss canton of Solothurn. It is an intermediate stop on the Olten–Aarau line.

== Services ==
As of the December 2023 timetable change, the following services stop at Däniken, including a nighttime services (SN11) offered by the Zürcher Verkehrsverbund (ZVV):

- RegioExpress RE6: three round-trips on weekends to Arth-Goldau.
- Aargau S-Bahn:
  - S23: hourly service between Langenthal and Baden.
  - S26: hourly service between Olten and Rotkreuz.
- Zurich S-Bahn:
  - SN11: on Friday and Saturday night, hourly service between Winterthur and Olten, via Zürich HB.

== See also ==
- Rail transport in Switzerland
