= Däniken, Solothurn =

Däniken
- Municipality
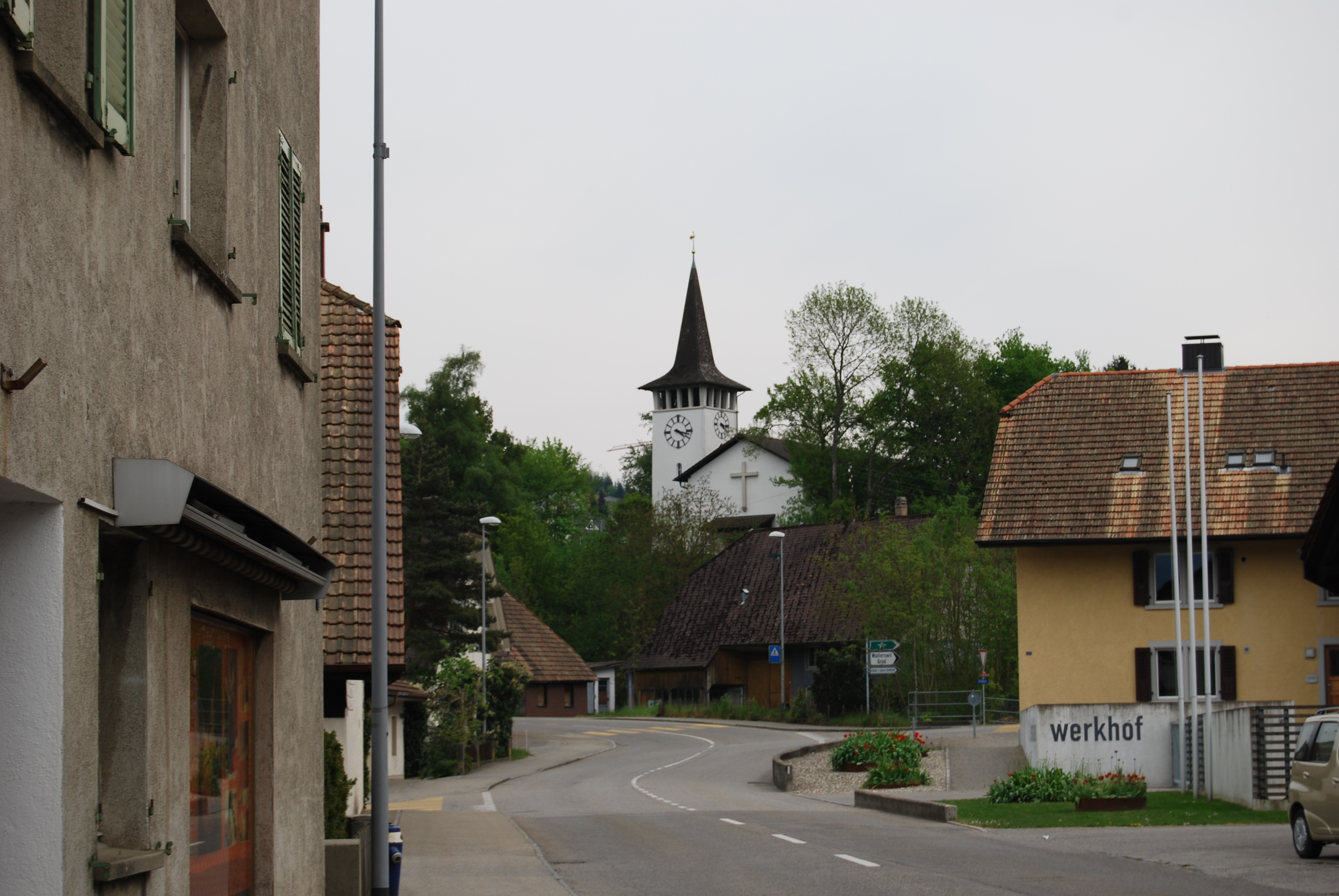

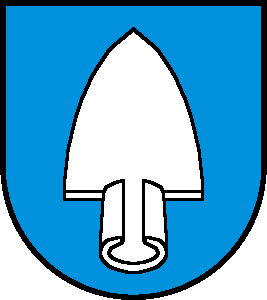
- Coat of arms
- Location of Däniken
- Location within Switzerland Location within Canton of Solothurn
- Coordinates: 47°21′N 7°59′E
- Country: Switzerland
- Canton: Solothurn
- District: Olten

Area
  - Total: 5.41 km^{2} (2.09 sq mi)
- Elevation: 382 m (1,253 ft)

Population (December 2020)
  - Total: 2,891
  - Density: 534/km^{2} (1,380/sq mi)
- Time zone: UTC+01:00 (CET)
  - Summer (DST): UTC+02:00 (CEST)
- Postal code: 4658
- SFOS number: 2572
- ISO 3166 code: CH-SO
- Surrounded by: Dulliken, Gretzenbach, Niedergösgen, Obergösgen, Walterswil
- Website: daeniken.ch

Däniken is a municipality in the district of Olten in the canton of Solothurn in Switzerland.

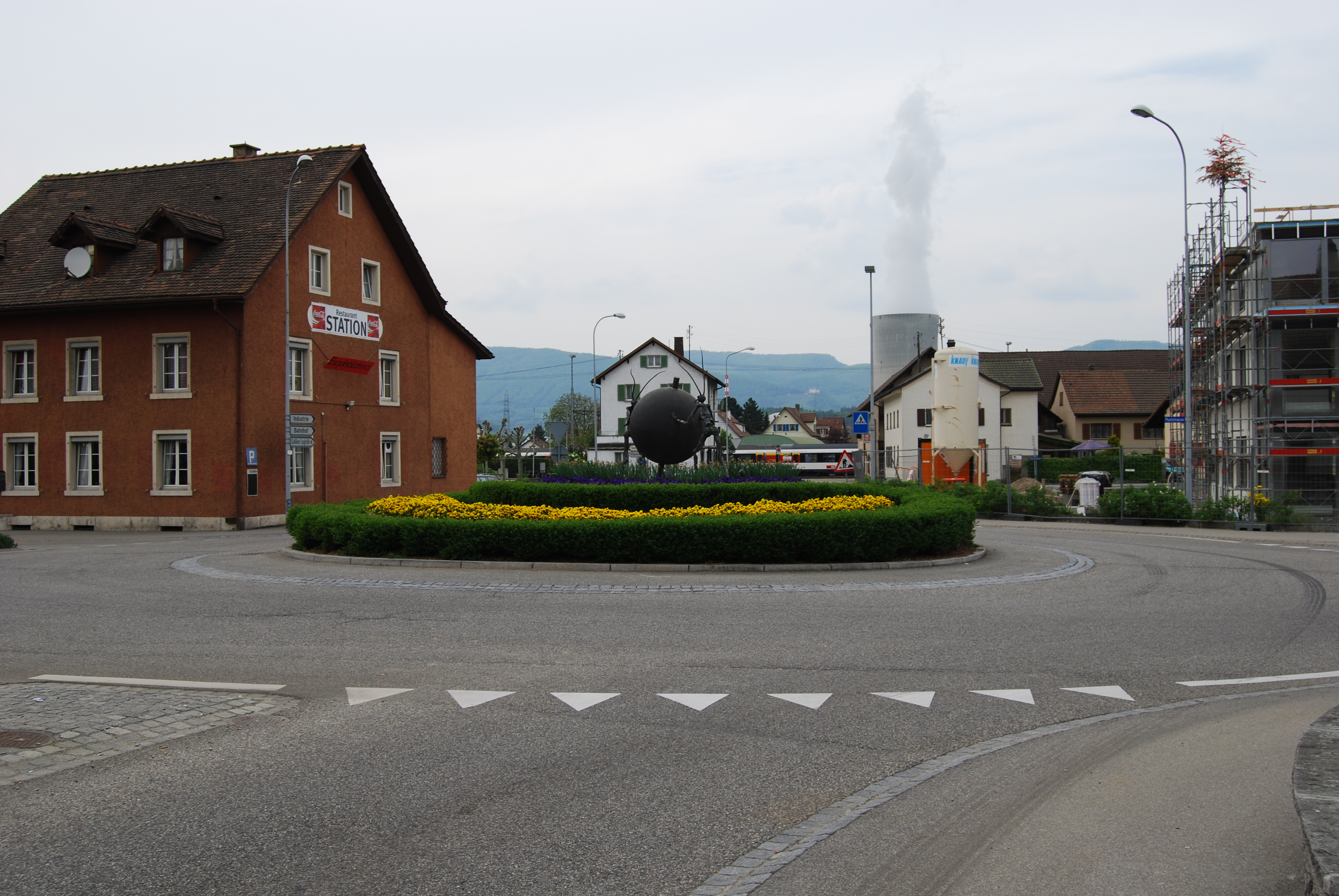
Däniken

== History ==
Däniken is first mentioned in 1273 as de Tennikon. In 1317 it was mentioned as de Tennenkon and in 1423 it was von Taennikon.

== Geography ==
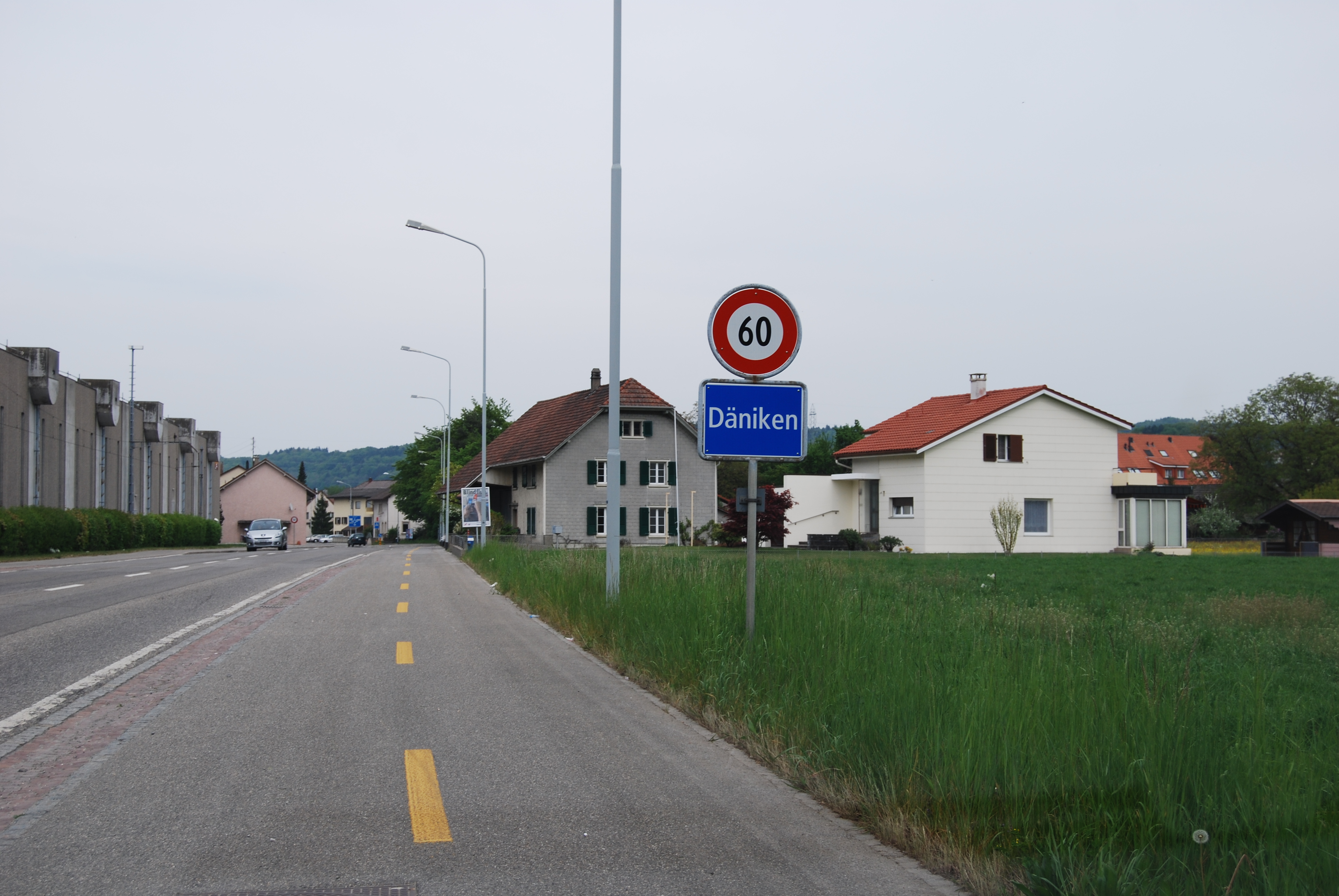
Entrance into Däniken

Däniken has an area, as of 2009, of 5.41 square kilometers (2.09 sq mi). Of this area, 1.75 km^{2} (0.68 sq mi) or 32.3% is used for agricultural purposes, while 1.85 km^{2} (0.71 sq mi) or 34.2% is forested. Of the rest of the land, 1.69 km^{2} (0.65 sq mi) or 31.2% is settled (buildings or roads), 0.05 km^{2} (12 acres) or 0.9% is either rivers or lakes and 0.03 km^{2} (7.4 acres) or 0.6% is unproductive land.

Of the built up area, industrial buildings made up 5.5% of the total area while housing and buildings made up 11.6% and transportation infrastructure made up 8.3%. Power and water infrastructure as well as other special developed areas made up 4.3% of the area while parks, green belts and sports fields made up 1.5%. Out of the forested land, 32.5% of the total land area is heavily forested and 1.7% is covered with orchards or small clusters of trees. Of the agricultural land, 19.2% is used for growing crops and 11.6% is pastures, while 1.5% is used for orchards or vine crops. All the water in the municipality is flowing water.

The municipality is located in the Olten district, along the Aare river. It consists of the village sections of Eich, Neu-Däniken and Hagnau.

Aerial view from 1500 m by Walter Mittelholzer (1923)

== Coat of arms ==
The blazon of the municipal coat of arms is Azure a Ploughshare Argent.

== Demographics ==
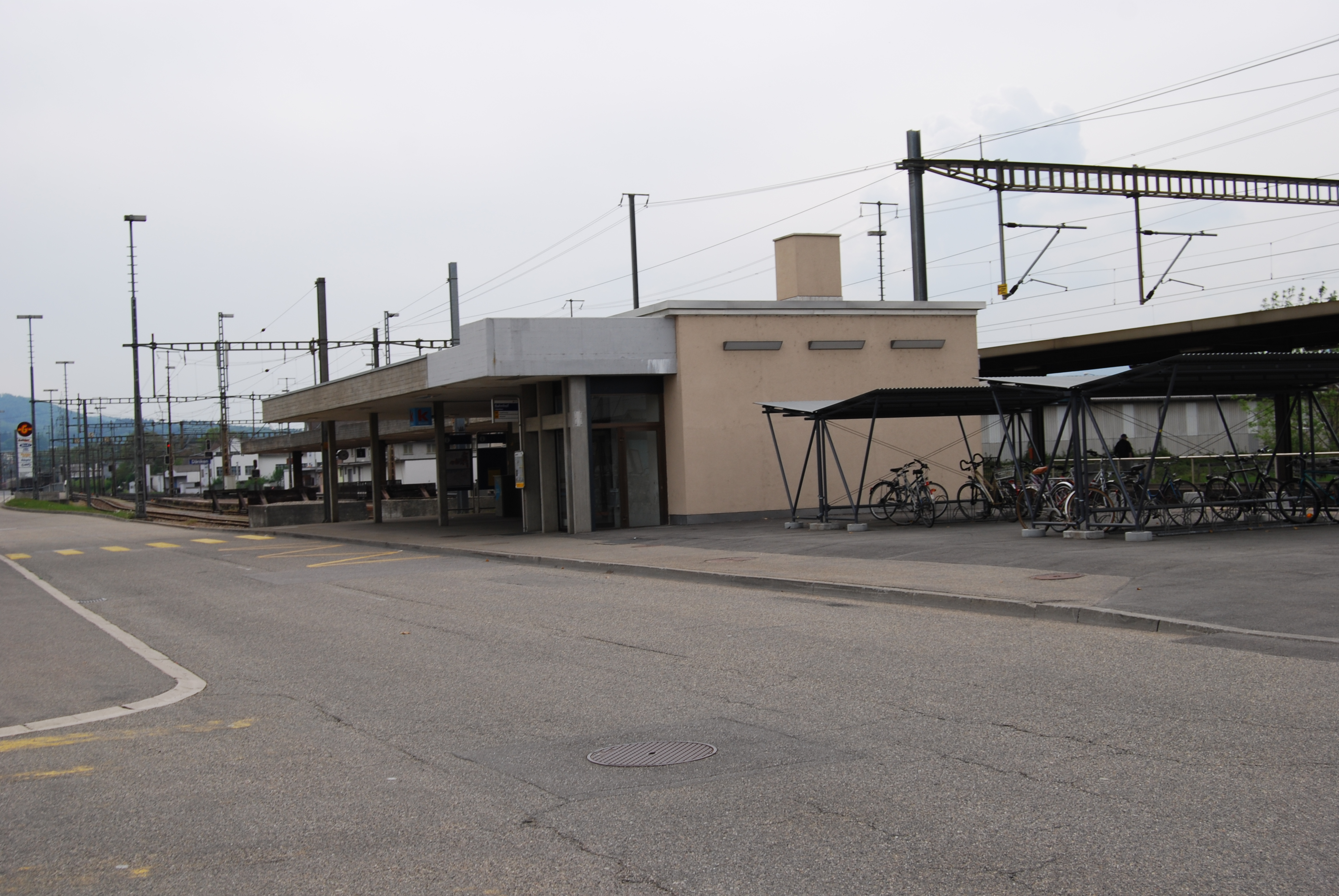
Däniken train station

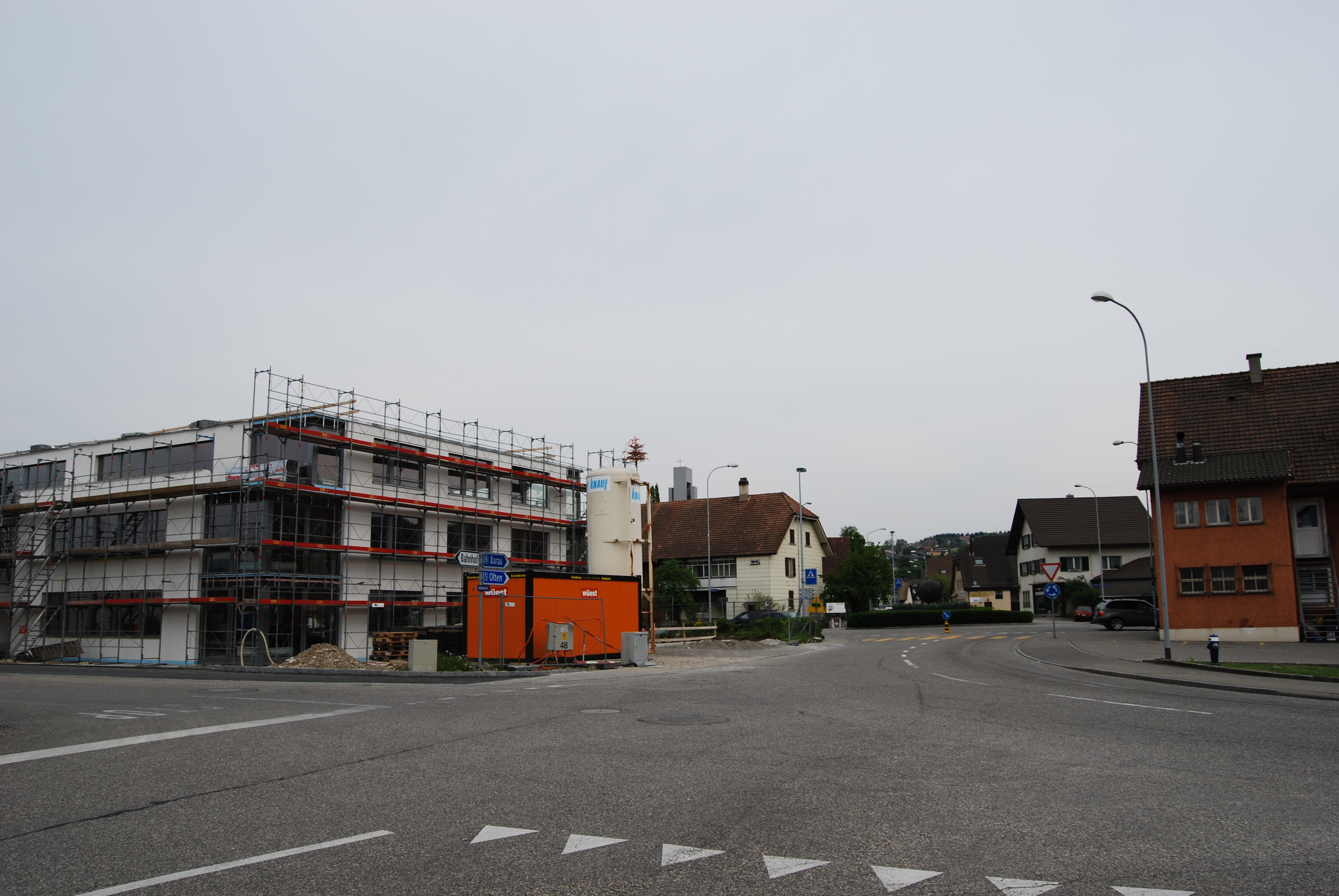
Construction in Däniken

Däniken has a population (as of December 2020) of 2,891. As of 2008, 17.3% of the population are resident foreign nationals. Over the last 10 years (1999–2009 ) the population has changed at a rate of 2.4%.

Most of the population (as of 2000) speaks German (2,330 or 89.5%), with Turkish being second most common (71 or 2.7%) and Serbo-Croatian being third (58 or 2.2%). There are 8 people who speak French and 1 person who speaks Romansh.

As of 2008, the gender distribution of the population was 50.5% male and 49.5% female. The population was made up of 1,111 Swiss men (41.0% of the population) and 259 (9.6%) non-Swiss men. There were 1,129 Swiss women (41.6%) and 212 (7.8%) non-Swiss women. Of the population in the municipality 665 or about 25.6% were born in Däniken and lived there in 2000. There were 677 or 26.0% who were born in the same canton, while 781 or 30.0% were born somewhere else in Switzerland, and 400 or 15.4% were born outside of Switzerland.

In 2008 there were 29 live births to Swiss citizens and 3 births to non-Swiss citizens, and in same time span there were 12 deaths of Swiss citizens and 2 non-Swiss citizen deaths. Ignoring immigration and emigration, the population of Swiss citizens increased by 17 while the foreign population increased by 1. There were 2 Swiss men who emigrated from Switzerland and 6 Swiss women who immigrated back to Switzerland. At the same time, there were 6 non-Swiss men and 12 non-Swiss women who immigrated from another country to Switzerland. The total Swiss population change in 2008 (from all sources, including moves across municipal borders) was an increase of 7 and the non-Swiss population decreased by 34 people. This represents a population growth rate of -1.0%.

The age distribution, as of 2000, in Däniken is; 161 children or 6.2% of the population are between 0 and 6 years old and 416 teenagers or 16.0% are between 7 and 19. Of the adult population, 168 people or 6.5% of the population are between 20 and 24 years old. 860 people or 33.1% are between 25 and 44, and 679 people or 26.1% are between 45 and 64. The senior population distribution is 251 people or 9.6% of the population are between 65 and 79 years old and there are 67 people or 2.6% who are over 80.

As of 2000, there were 1,066 people who were single and never married in the municipality. There were 1,316 married individuals, 104 widows or widowers and 116 individuals who are divorced.

As of 2000, there were 1,068 private households in the municipality, and an average of 2.4 persons per household. There were 271 households that consist of only one person and 63 households with five or more people. Out of a total of 1,083 households that answered this question, 25.0% were households made up of just one person and there were 7 adults who lived with their parents. Of the rest of the households, there are 353 married couples without children, 375 married couples with children There were 46 single parents with a child or children. There were 16 households that were made up of unrelated people and 15 households that were made up of some sort of institution or another collective housing.

In 2000 there were 451 single-family homes (or 71.7% of the total) out of a total of 629 inhabited buildings. There were 94 multi-family buildings (14.9%), along with 62 multi-purpose buildings that were mostly used for housing (9.9%) and 22 other use buildings (commercial or industrial) that also had some housing (3.5%). Of the single-family homes 23 were built before 1919, while 65 were built between 1990 and 2000. The greatest number of single-family homes (93) were built between 1961 and 1970.

In 2000 there were 1,206 apartments in the municipality. The most common apartment size was 4 rooms of which there were 401. There were 18 single-room apartments and 426 apartments with five or more rooms. Of these apartments, a total of 1,054 apartments (87.4% of the total) were permanently occupied, while 92 apartments (7.6%) were seasonally occupied and 60 apartments (5.0%) were empty. As of 2009, the construction rate of new housing units was 12.7 new units per 1000 residents. The vacancy rate for the municipality, in 2010, was 1.52%.

The historical population is given in the following chart:

== Politics ==
In the 2007 federal election the most popular party was the SVP which received 39.87% of the vote. The next three most popular parties were the FDP (19%), the CVP (16.71%) and the SP (14.77%). In the federal election, a total of 992 votes were cast, and the voter turnout was 53.0%.

== Economy ==
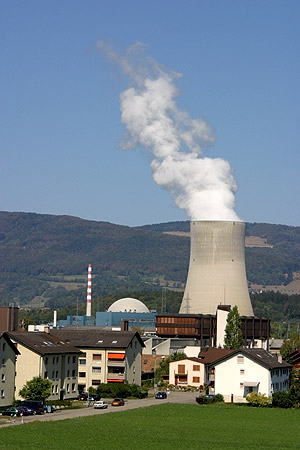
Gösgen Nuclear Power Plant near Däniken

As of 2010, Däniken had an unemployment rate of 2.9%. As of 2008, there were 30 people employed in the primary economic sector and about 12 businesses involved in this sector. 1,254 people were employed in the secondary sector and there were 41 businesses in this sector. 755 people were employed in the tertiary sector, with 96 businesses in this sector. There were 1,532 residents of the municipality who were employed in some capacity, of which females made up 43.9% of the workforce.

In 2008 the total number of full-time equivalent jobs was 1,860. The number of jobs in the primary sector was 20, of which 16 were in agriculture and 4 were in forestry or lumber production. The number of jobs in the secondary sector was 1,182 of which 645 or (54.6%) were in manufacturing, 5 or (0.4%) were in mining and 86 (7.3%) were in construction. The number of jobs in the tertiary sector was 658. In the tertiary sector; 315 or 47.9% were in wholesale or retail sales or the repair of motor vehicles, 169 or 25.7% were in the movement and storage of goods, 22 or 3.3% were in a hotel or restaurant, 43 or 6.5% were in the information industry, 14 or 2.1% were the insurance or financial industry, 22 or 3.3% were technical professionals or scientists, 29 or 4.4% were in education and 5 or 0.8% were in health care.

In 2000, there were 1,458 workers who commuted into the municipality and 1,075 workers who commuted away. The municipality is a net importer of workers, with about 1.4 workers entering the municipality for every one leaving. Of the working population, 14.6% used public transportation to get to work, and 60.8% used a private car.

== Religion ==
From the 2000 census, 901 or 34.6% were Roman Catholic, while 851 or 32.7% belonged to the Swiss Reformed Church. Of the rest of the population, there were 60 members of an Orthodox church (or about 2.31% of the population), there were 25 individuals (or about 0.96% of the population) who belonged to the Christian Catholic Church, and there were 31 individuals (or about 1.19% of the population) who belonged to another Christian church. There were 200 (or about 7.69% of the population) who were Islamic. There were 9 individuals who were Buddhist, 2 individuals who were Hindu and 6 individuals who belonged to another church. 450 (or about 17.29% of the population) belonged to no church, are agnostic or atheist, and 67 individuals (or about 2.57% of the population) did not answer the question.

== Transport ==
Däniken sits on the Olten–Aarau line and is served by trains at Däniken railway station.

== Education ==
In Däniken about 1,102 or (42.4%) of the population have completed non-mandatory upper secondary education, and 227 or (8.7%) have completed additional higher education (either university or a Fachhochschule). Of the 227 who completed tertiary schooling, 75.8% were Swiss men, 17.2% were Swiss women, 3.1% were non-Swiss men and 4.0% were non-Swiss women.

During the 2010–2011 school year there were a total of 202 students in the Däniken school system. The education system in the Canton of Solothurn allows young children to attend two years of non-obligatory Kindergarten. During that school year, there were 45 children in kindergarten. The canton's school system requires students to attend six years of primary school, with some of the children attending smaller, specialized classes. In the municipality there were 157 students in primary school. The secondary school program consists of three lower, obligatory years of schooling, followed by three to five years of optional, advanced schools. All the lower secondary students from Däniken attend their school in a neighboring municipality.

As of 2000, there were 32 students in Däniken who came from another municipality, while 126 residents attended schools outside the municipality.
