= Walterswil =

Walterswil may refer to several places in Switzerland:

- Walterswil, Solothurn, a municipality in the district of Olten
- Walterswil, Berne, a municipality in the district of Trachselwald
- Walterswil, Zug (Walterswil-Sihlbrugg), part of Baar, Switzerland
