= Eppenberg Tunnel =

Railway tunnel in Switzerland

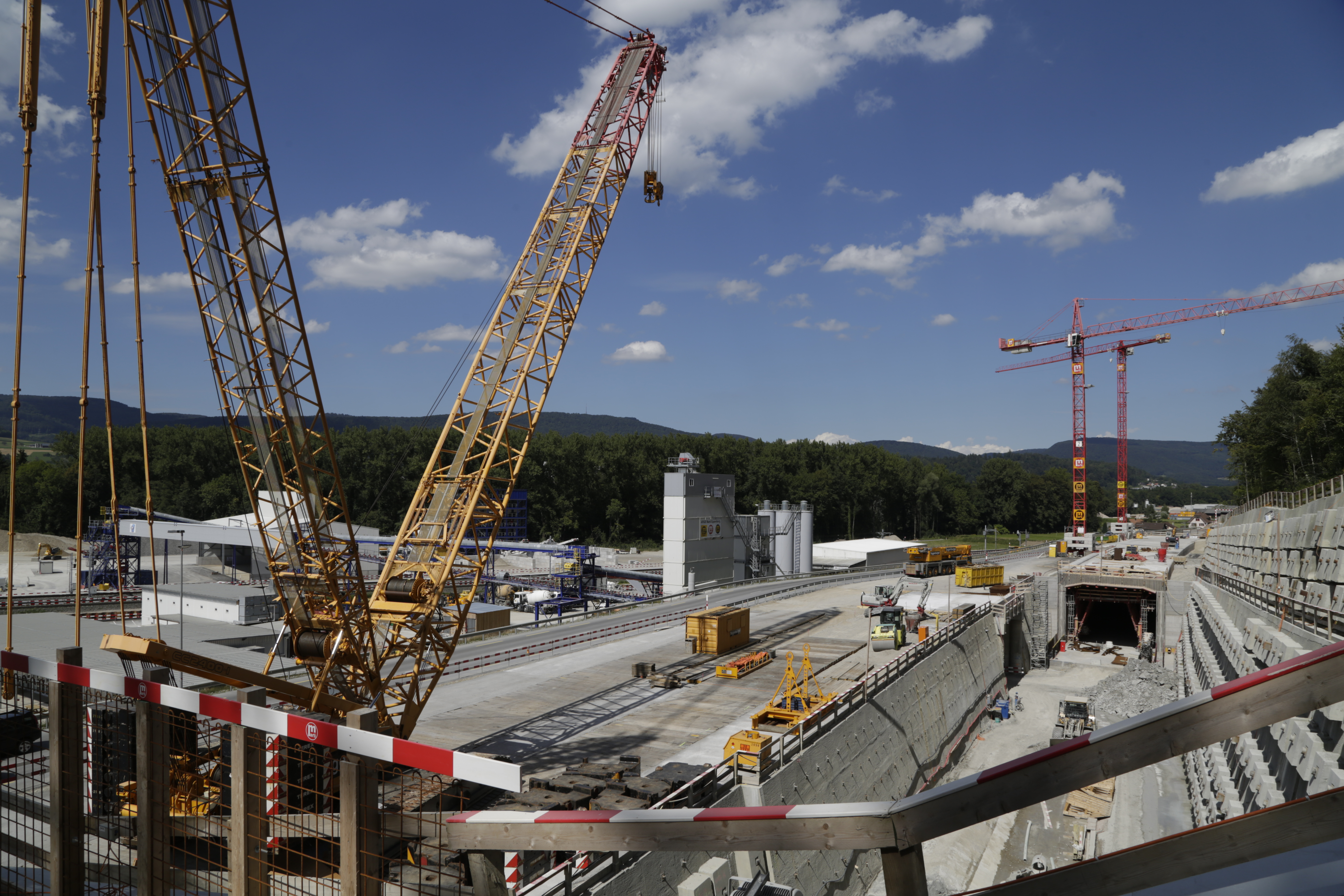
- Construction site at Wöschnau portal, August 20
- Interactive map of Eppenberg Tunnel

Overview
- Official name: German: Eppenbergtunnel
- Line: Aarau–Olten line
- Location: Solothurn, Switzerland
- Coordinates: 47.3704°N 8.0112°E
- System: Swiss Federal Railways (SBB CFF FFS)
- Start: Wöschnau, canton of Solothurn, Switzerland
- End: Schönenwerd, canton of Solothurn, Switzerland

Operation
- Work began: 2 May 2015
- Opened: 12 October 2020
- Owner: SBB CFF FFS
- Operator: SBB CFF FFS
- Traffic: Railway
- Character: Passenger, Freight

Technical
- Length: 3.114 km (1.935 mi)
- No. of tracks: One double track tube
- Track gauge: 1,435 mm (4 ft 8 1/2 in) standard gauge
- Electrified: 15 kV 16.7 Hz
- Operating speed: 160 km/h (99 mph)

The Eppenberg Tunnel is a railway tunnel in the Canton of Solothurn, Switzerland. It is part of the 'Future Development of Railway Infrastructure' plan (German: Zukünftige Entwicklung der Bahninfrastruktur or 'ZEB') and increases capacity on the Aarau–Olten line in the Schönenwerd–Däniken section.

A particularly constraining bottleneck in the Swiss rail infrastructure is in the section between Aarau and Olten, which has only two tracks at Eppenberg-Wöschnau, Schönenwerd and Gretzenbach. The route has to be shared by international and national passenger trains as well as freight. Hence quadrupling the complete line between Aarau and Olten had high priority among infrastructure projects.

The main purpose of the tunnel is to increase capacity. The two additional tracks in parallel with the existing double track line effectively create a four track line.

The Federal Assembly adopted the law authoring the 'ZEB' programme in the spring session of 2009, authorising the budget for the Eppenberg tunnel. Due to the large financial requirements for the New Railway Link through the Alps project, construction of the Eppenberg tunnel only began in 2015.

== Planning ==
The project is planned and managed by Swiss Federal Railways (SBB) Infrastructure in Olten. The Eppenberg tunnel is the core of the approximately 3.5 km long new line, which will pass south of the center of Schönenwerd and will have a straighter alignment than the existing line, which has a tight curve in Schönenwerd. Nominal line speed in the tunnel is 160 km/h. Revenue services through the tunnel will begin with the new timetable on December 13, 2020.

The western tunnel portal is located in the area of the municipality of Gretzenbach. Where the future tunnel passes under the road, it was to be built by the cut and cover method. The tunnel will be 3114m long, this length is divided into the 125m cut and cover section at the Gretzenbach portal, the 2616m tunnel section (around 600 meters with the hydroshield method) and the 373m cut and cover section at Wöschnau portal.

The eastern tunnel portal will be built to the west of the Wöschnau district. In the vicinity of the future underpass under Route 5, a deep hole was dug in which the tunnel boring machine that excavated the main part of the tunnel was assembled.

As part of the same plan, two overpasses will be built in the approach to Olten station, which will largely eliminate at-grade crossings at the Olten junction.

== Construction ==
In advance, the SBB built a new signal box in Wöschnau for traffic management during the construction period.

In autumn 2014, work began on the construction site near Wöschnau and Gretzenbach. This included clearing, earth moving, slope protection, demolition work, road construction and other measures. The Gretzenbach river was diverted. The substructure for the additional track began at Däniken.

On 2 May 2015, a tunnel construction party with the official groundbreaking took place at the construction site near Wöschnau, in which Federal Counsellor Doris Leuthard, the SBB Group Management, the Government Council of the Canton of Aargau and the Government of the Canton of Solothurn participated.

ARGE Marti Eppenberg won the contract for the project for CHF885mio. The construction company Huber from Eppenberg-Wöschnau was a contractor.

The excavation of the tunnel was used to fill the dismantled Kölliken hazardous waste landfill.

== Operation ==
The SBB inaugurated the tunnel on 12 October. Revenue services through the tunnel begun with the new timetable on 13 December 2020.

== Map ==
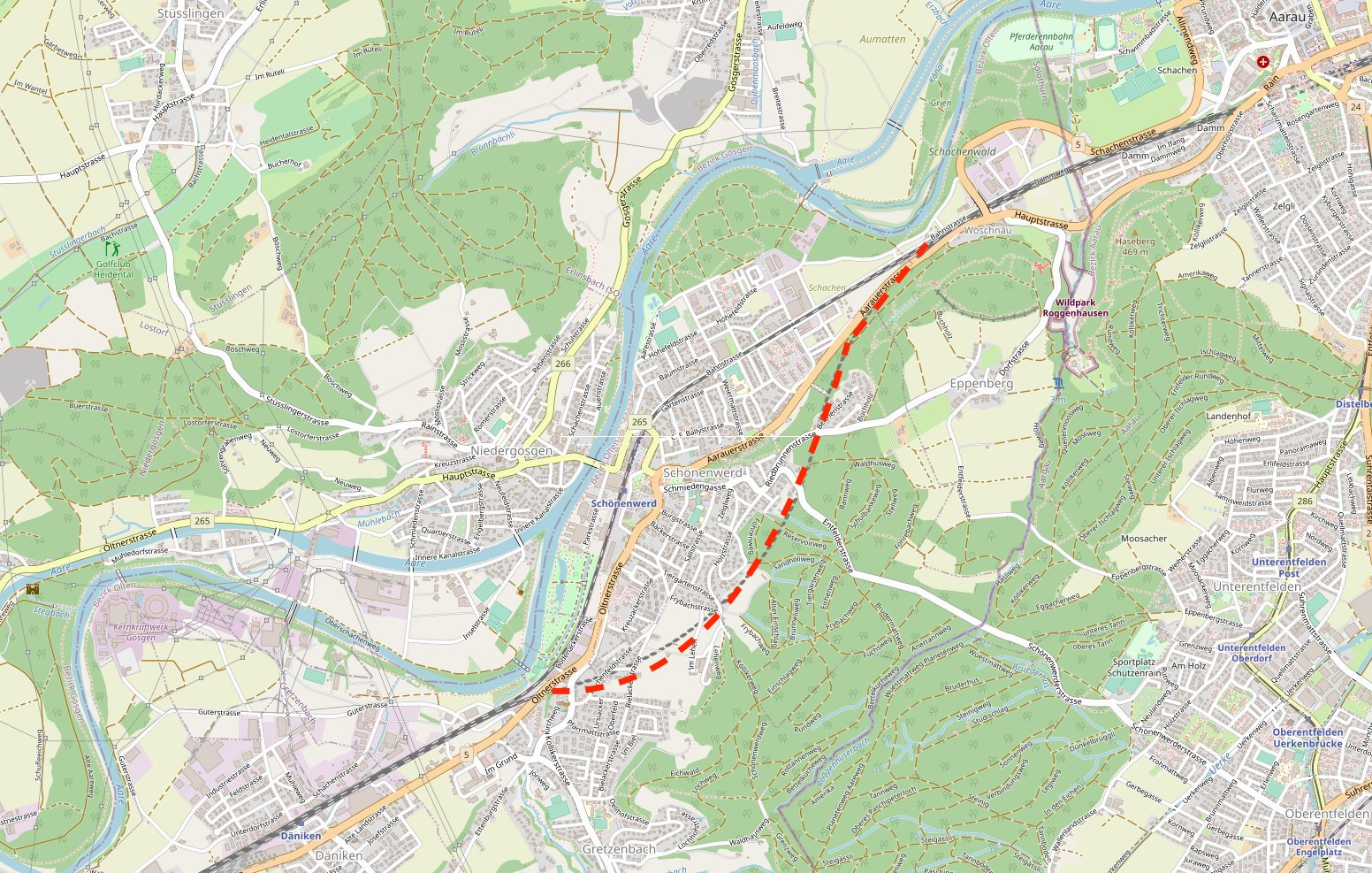
Alignment of the Eppenberg Tunnel
