= Dulliken =

- Municipality
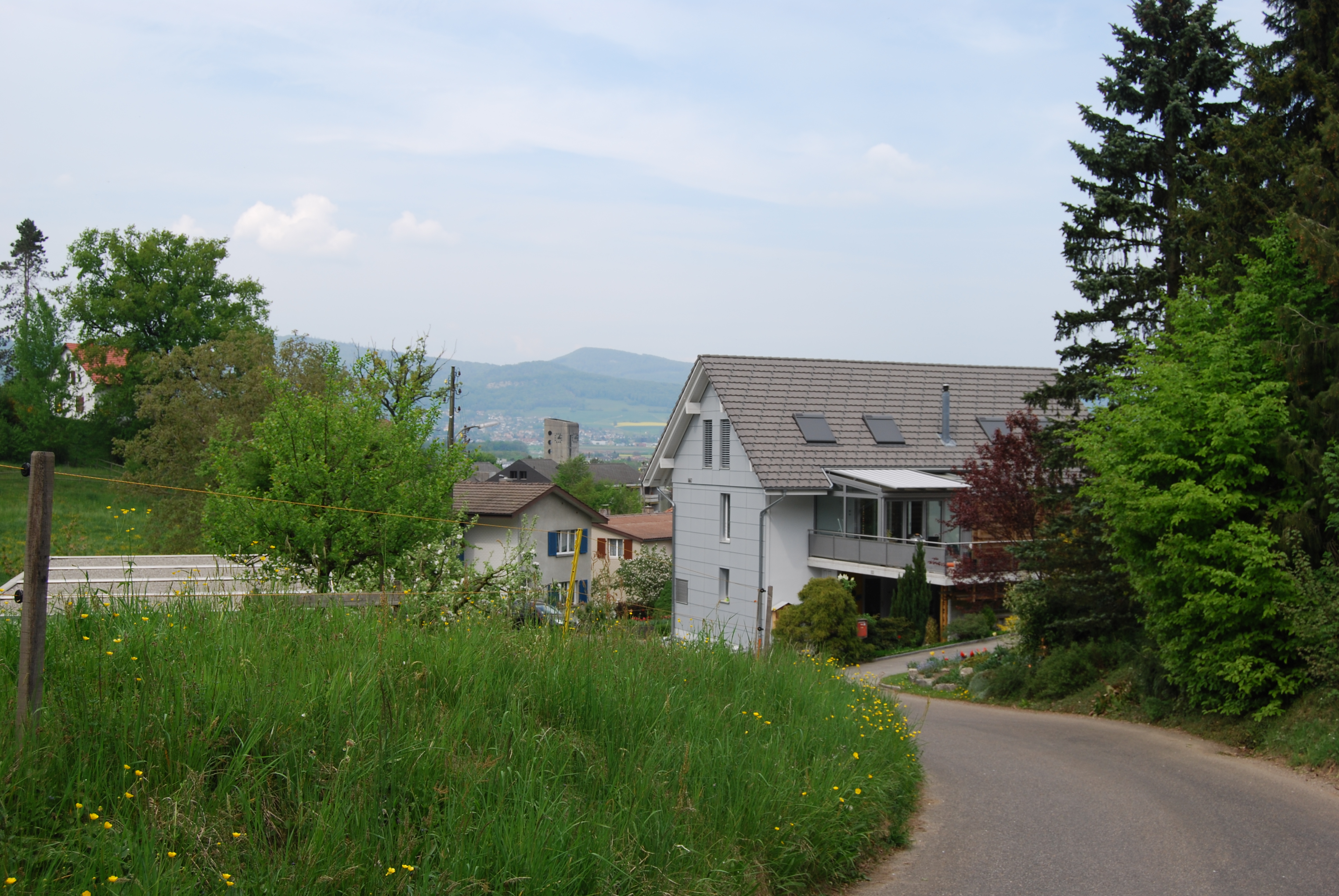

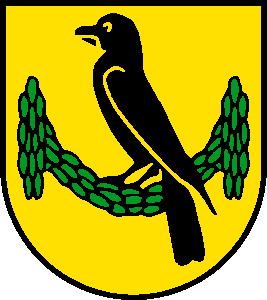
- Coat of arms
- Location of Dulliken
- Location within Switzerland Location within Canton of Solothurn
- Coordinates: 47°21′N 7°57′E
- Country: Switzerland
- Canton: Solothurn
- District: Olten

Area
  - Total: 6.06 km^{2} (2.34 sq mi)
- Elevation: 436 m (1,430 ft)

Population (December 2020)
  - Total: 5,083
  - Density: 839/km^{2} (2,170/sq mi)
- Time zone: UTC+01:00 (CET)
  - Summer (DST): UTC+02:00 (CEST)
- Postal code: 4657
- SFOS number: 2573
- ISO 3166 code: CH-SO
- Surrounded by: Däniken, Obergösgen, Oftringen (AG), Olten, Starrkirch-Wil, Walterswil, Winznau
- Twin towns: Ammerndorf (Germany)
- Website: dulliken.ch

Dulliken is a municipality in the district of Olten in the canton of Solothurn in Switzerland.

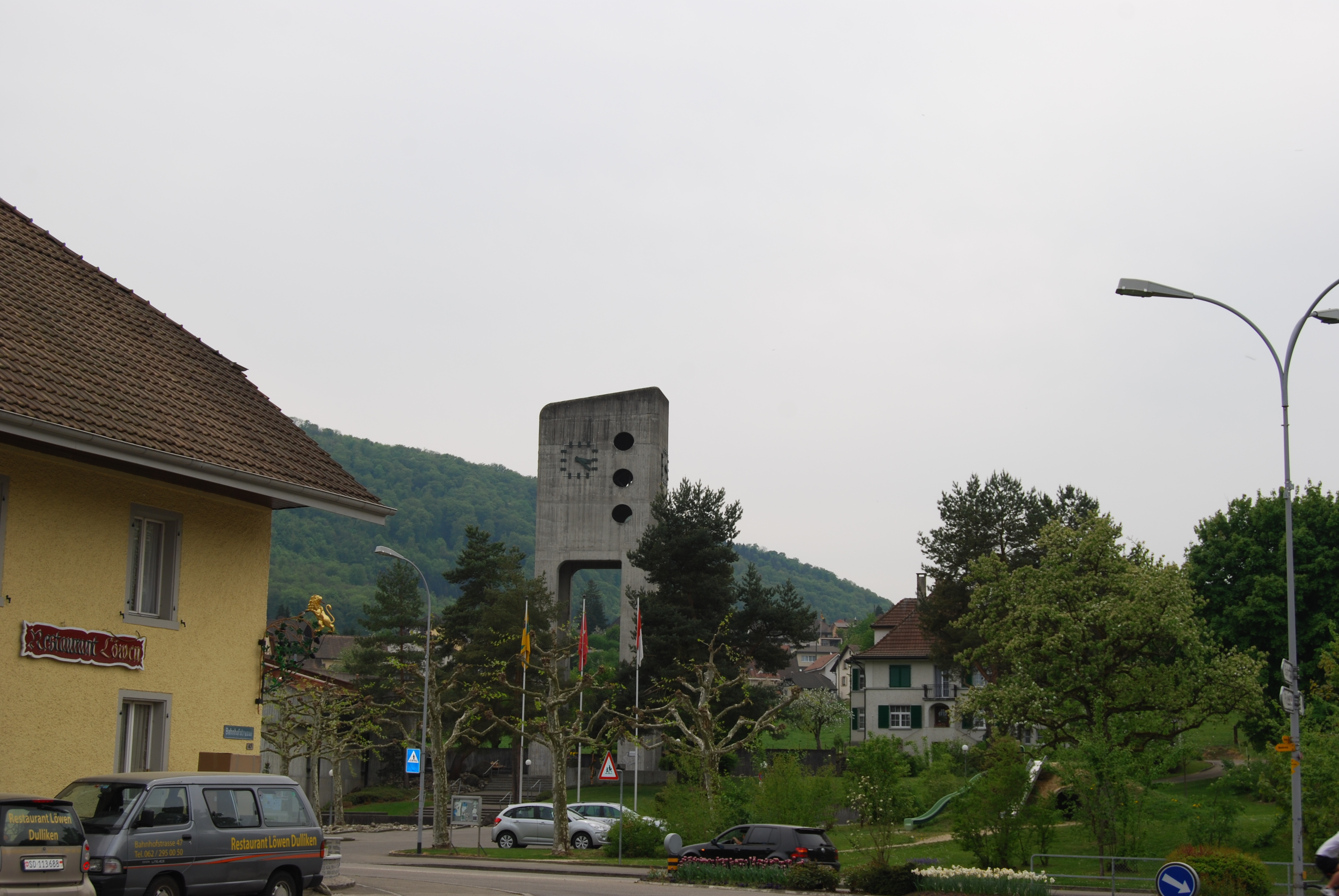
Dulliken

== History ==
Dulliken is first mentioned in 924 as Tullinchova. In 1173 it was mentioned as Tullichon.

== Geography ==
Aerial view (1968)

Dulliken has an area, as of 2009, of 6.06 square kilometers (2.34 sq mi). Of this area, 2.33 km^{2} (0.90 sq mi) or 38.4% is used for agricultural purposes, while 2.01 km^{2} (0.78 sq mi) or 33.2% is forested. Of the rest of the land, 1.65 km^{2} (0.64 sq mi) or 27.2% is settled (buildings or roads), 0.04 km^{2} (9.9 acres) or 0.7% is either rivers or lakes.

Of the built up area, industrial buildings made up 4.8% of the total area while housing and buildings made up 13.7% and transportation infrastructure made up 5.1%. Power and water infrastructure as well as other special developed areas made up 2.6% of the area Out of the forested land, 31.7% of the total land area is heavily forested and 1.5% is covered with orchards or small clusters of trees. Of the agricultural land, 20.1% is used for growing crops and 16.8% is pastures, while 1.5% is used for orchards or vine crops. All the water in the municipality is flowing water.

The municipality is located in the Olten district, on the northern slope of Engelberg mountain. It consists of the village of Dulliken, the settlement of Schachen and farm houses on the mountain.

== Coat of arms ==
The blazon of the municipal coat of arms is Or a Jackdaw Sable sitting on a Garland of Leaves Vert.

== Demographics ==
Dulliken has a population (as of December 2020) of 5,083. As of 2008, 38.3% of the population are resident foreign nationals. Over the last 10 years (1999–2009 ) the population has changed at a rate of -1.5%.

Most of the population (as of 2000) speaks German (3,653 or 79.2%), with Italian being second most common (423 or 9.2%) and Turkish being third (183 or 4.0%). There are 28 people who speak French and 3 people who speak Romansh.

As of 2008, the gender distribution of the population was 49.7% male and 50.3% female. The population was made up of 1,328 Swiss men (28.2% of the population) and 1,009 (21.5%) non-Swiss men. There were 1,487 Swiss women (31.6%) and 878 (18.7%) non-Swiss women. Of the population in the municipality 1,194 or about 25.9% were born in Dulliken and lived there in 2000. There were 1,008 or 21.8% who were born in the same canton, while 1,163 or 25.2% were born somewhere else in Switzerland, and 1,107 or 24.0% were born outside of Switzerland.

In 2008 there were 7 live births to Swiss citizens and 22 births to non-Swiss citizens, and in same time span there were 31 deaths of Swiss citizens and 5 non-Swiss citizen deaths. Ignoring immigration and emigration, the population of Swiss citizens decreased by 24 while the foreign population increased by 17. There were 6 Swiss men and 7 Swiss women who immigrated back to Switzerland. At the same time, there were 9 non-Swiss men and 10 non-Swiss women who immigrated from another country to Switzerland. The total Swiss population change in 2008 (from all sources, including moves across municipal borders) was a decrease of 44 and the non-Swiss population increased by 12 people. This represents a population growth rate of -0.7%.

The age distribution, as of 2000, in Dulliken is; 355 children or 7.7% of the population are between 0 and 6 years old and 850 teenagers or 18.4% are between 7 and 19. Of the adult population, 230 people or 5.0% of the population are between 20 and 24 years old. 1,380 people or 29.9% are between 25 and 44, and 1,113 people or 24.1% are between 45 and 64. The senior population distribution is 508 people or 11.0% of the population are between 65 and 79 years old and there are 179 people or 3.9% who are over 80.

As of 2000, there were 1,785 people who were single and never married in the municipality. There were 2,305 married individuals, 296 widows or widowers and 229 individuals who are divorced.

As of 2000, there were 1,856 private households in the municipality, and an average of 2.4 persons per household. There were 552 households that consist of only one person and 150 households with five or more people. Out of a total of 1,875 households that answered this question, 29.4% were households made up of just one person and there were 14 adults who lived with their parents. Of the rest of the households, there are 528 married couples without children, 637 married couples with children There were 102 single parents with a child or children. There were 23 households that were made up of unrelated people and 19 households that were made up of some sort of institution or another collective housing.

In 2000 there were 664 single family homes (or 69.4% of the total) out of a total of 957 inhabited buildings. There were 189 multi-family buildings (19.7%), along with 67 multi-purpose buildings that were mostly used for housing (7.0%) and 37 other use buildings (commercial or industrial) that also had some housing (3.9%). Of the single family homes 47 were built before 1919, while 76 were built between 1990 and 2000. The greatest number of single family homes (168) were built between 1946 and 1960.

In 2000 there were 2,087 apartments in the municipality. The most common apartment size was 4 rooms of which there were 687. There were 32 single room apartments and 551 apartments with five or more rooms. Of these apartments, a total of 1,745 apartments (83.6% of the total) were permanently occupied, while 199 apartments (9.5%) were seasonally occupied and 143 apartments (6.9%) were empty. As of 2009, the construction rate of new housing units was 0.9 new units per 1000 residents. The vacancy rate for the municipality, in 2010, was 6.42%.

The historical population is given in the following chart:

== Politics ==
In the 2007 federal election the most popular party was the SVP which received 35.74% of the vote. The next three most popular parties were the SP (24.45%), the CVP (17.66%) and the FDP (13.34%). In the federal election, a total of 1,212 votes were cast, and the voter turnout was 49.6%.

== Economy ==
As of 2010, Dulliken had an unemployment rate of 6.1%. As of 2008, there were 31 people employed in the primary economic sector and about 13 businesses involved in this sector. 515 people were employed in the secondary sector and there were 43 businesses in this sector. 803 people were employed in the tertiary sector, with 108 businesses in this sector. There were 2,358 residents of the municipality who were employed in some capacity, of which females made up 41.3% of the workforce.

In 2008 the total number of full-time equivalent jobs was 1,156. The number of jobs in the primary sector was 20, all of which were in agriculture. The number of jobs in the secondary sector was 480 of which 410 or (85.4%) were in manufacturing and 69 (14.4%) were in construction. The number of jobs in the tertiary sector was 656. In the tertiary sector; 311 or 47.4% were in wholesale or retail sales or the repair of motor vehicles, 93 or 14.2% were in the movement and storage of goods, 31 or 4.7% were in a hotel or restaurant, 7 or 1.1% were the insurance or financial industry, 13 or 2.0% were technical professionals or scientists, 40 or 6.1% were in education and 78 or 11.9% were in health care.

In 2000, there were 859 workers who commuted into the municipality and 1,753 workers who commuted away. The municipality is a net exporter of workers, with about 2.0 workers leaving the municipality for every one entering. Of the working population, 23.3% used public transportation to get to work, and 52.2% used a private car.

== Religion ==
From the 2000 census, 2,070 or 44.9% were Roman Catholic, while 1,149 or 24.9% belonged to the Swiss Reformed Church. Of the rest of the population, there were 77 members of an Orthodox church (or about 1.67% of the population), there were 55 individuals (or about 1.19% of the population) who belonged to the Christian Catholic Church, and there were 100 individuals (or about 2.17% of the population) who belonged to another Christian church. There were 3 individuals (or about 0.07% of the population) who were Jewish, and 545 (or about 11.81% of the population) who were Islamic. There were 24 individuals who were Buddhist, 12 individuals who were Hindu and 1 individual who belonged to another church. 475 (or about 10.29% of the population) belonged to no church, are agnostic or atheist, and 104 individuals (or about 2.25% of the population) did not answer the question.

== Transport ==
Dulliken sits on the Olten–Aarau line and is served by trains at Dulliken railway station.

== Education ==
In Dulliken about 1,595 or (34.6%) of the population have completed non-mandatory upper secondary education, and 334 or (7.2%) have completed additional higher education (either university or a Fachhochschule). Of the 334 who completed tertiary schooling, 71.6% were Swiss men, 15.9% were Swiss women, 8.7% were non-Swiss men and 3.9% were non-Swiss women.

During the 2010–2011 school year there were a total of 506 students in the Dulliken school system. The education system in the Canton of Solothurn allows young children to attend two years of non-obligatory Kindergarten. During that school year, there were 84 children in kindergarten. The canton's school system requires students to attend six years of primary school, with some of the children attending smaller, specialized classes. In the municipality there were 245 students in primary school and 32 students in the special, smaller classes. The secondary school program consists of three lower, obligatory years of schooling, followed by three to five years of optional, advanced schools. 145 lower secondary students attend school in Dulliken.

As of 2000, there were 10 students in Dulliken who came from another municipality, while 118 residents attended schools outside the municipality.

Dulliken is home to the Gemeindebibibliothek Dulliken library. The library has (as of 2008) 13,201 books or other media, and loaned out 48,407 items in the same year. It was open a total of 240 days with average of 14 hours per week during that year.
