= Obergösgen =

- Municipality
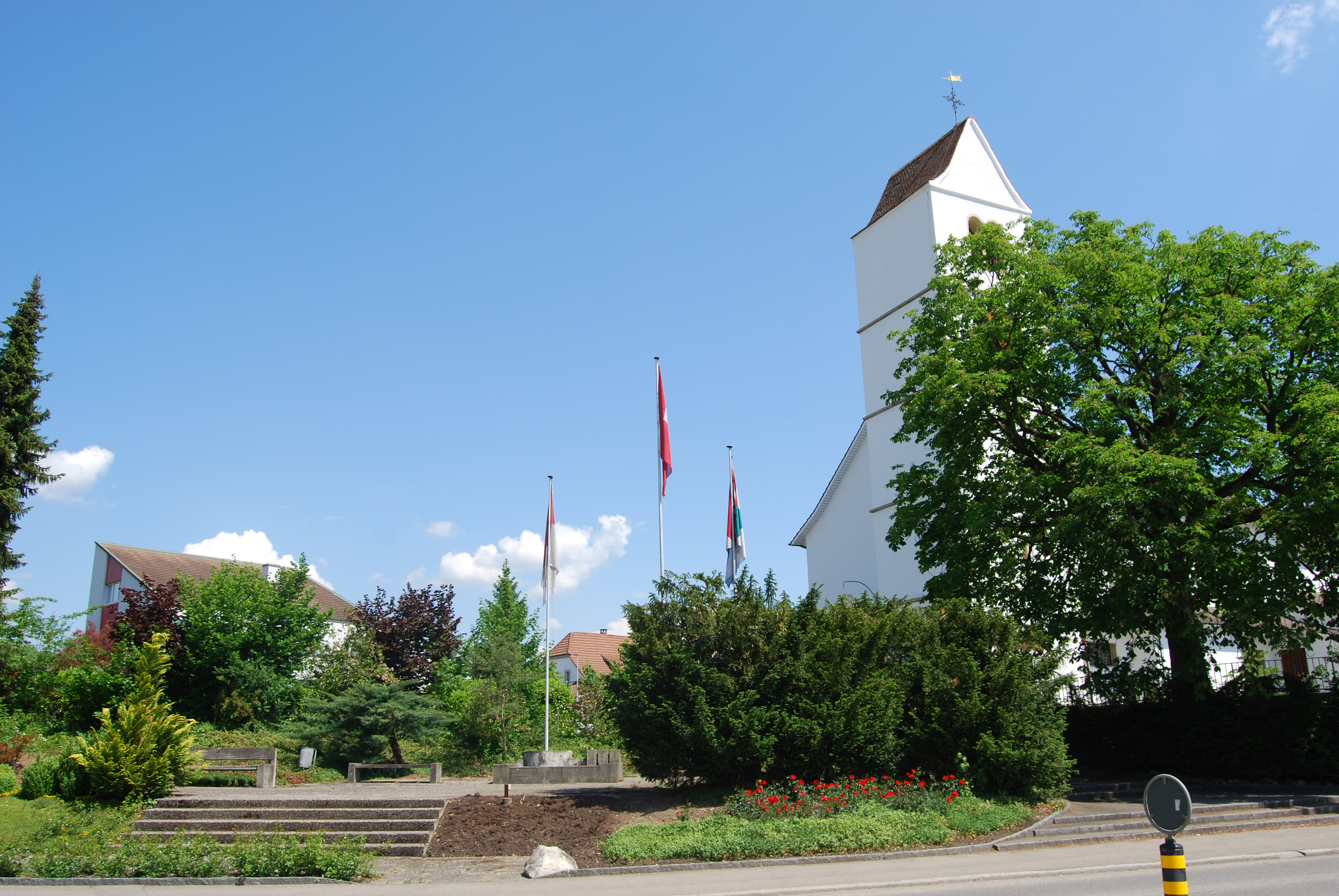

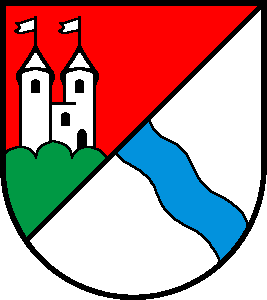
- Coat of arms
- Location of Obergösgen
- Location within Switzerland Location within Canton of Solothurn
- Coordinates: 47°22′N 7°57′E
- Country: Switzerland
- Canton: Solothurn
- District: Gösgen

Area
  - Total: 3.64 km^{2} (1.41 sq mi)
- Elevation: 390 m (1,280 ft)

Population (December 2020)
  - Total: 2,359
  - Density: 648/km^{2} (1,680/sq mi)
- Time zone: UTC+01:00 (CET)
  - Summer (DST): UTC+02:00 (CEST)
- Postal code: 4653
- SFOS number: 2497
- ISO 3166 code: CH-SO
- Surrounded by: Däniken, Dulliken, Lostorf, Niedergösgen, Winznau
- Website: www.obergoesgen.ch

Obergösgen is a municipality in the district of Gösgen in the canton of Solothurn in Switzerland.

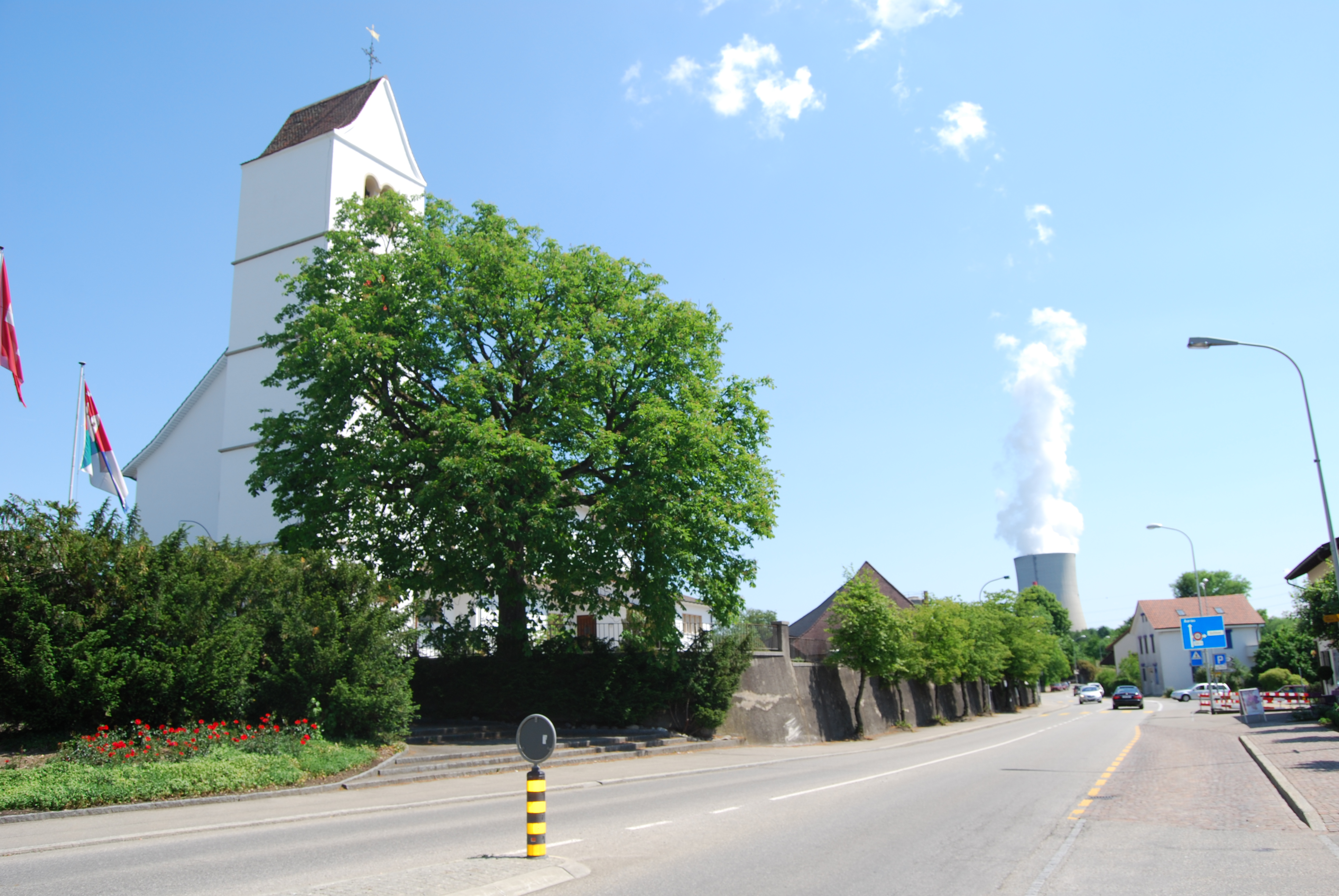
Obergösgen

== History ==
Obergösgen is first mentioned in 1161 as Gozequouon. In 1308 it was mentioned as Göskon superior.

== Geography ==
Aerial view (1970)

Obergösgen has an area, as of 2009, of 3.64 square kilometers (1.41 sq mi). Of this area, 1.48 km^{2} (0.57 sq mi) or 40.7% is used for agricultural purposes, while 1.07 km^{2} (0.41 sq mi) or 29.4% is forested. Of the rest of the land, 0.77 km^{2} (0.30 sq mi) or 21.2% is settled (buildings or roads), 0.29 km^{2} (0.11 sq mi) or 8.0% is either rivers or lakes and 0.02 km^{2} (4.9 acres) or 0.5% is unproductive land.

Of the built up area, industrial buildings made up 2.2% of the total area while housing and buildings made up 14.6% and transportation infrastructure made up 2.7%. while parks, green belts and sports fields made up 1.1%. Out of the forested land, 28.0% of the total land area is heavily forested and 1.4% is covered with orchards or small clusters of trees. Of the agricultural land, 32.1% is used for growing crops and 7.7% is pastures. All the water in the municipality is flowing water.

The municipality is located in the Gösgen district, along the Aare river. It consists of the village of Obergösgen and the village section of Schachen.

== Coat of arms ==
The blazon of the municipal coat of arms is Per bend sinister Gules a Castle Argent with two towers roofed and topped with a flag each on a triple mount Vert and Argent a Bend wavy Azure.

== Demographics ==
Obergösgen has a population (as of December 2020) of 2,359. As of 2008, 21.6% of the population are resident foreign nationals. Over the last 10 years (1999–2009) the population has changed at a rate of 5.7%.

Most of the population (as of 2000) speaks German (1,673 or 86.2%), with Albanian being second most common (64 or 3.3%) and Italian being third (52 or 2.7%). There are 13 people who speak French and 1 person who speaks Romansh.

As of 2008, the gender distribution of the population was 49.9% male and 50.1% female. The population was made up of 790 Swiss men (37.9% of the population) and 251 (12.0%) non-Swiss men. There were 832 Swiss women (39.9%) and 214 (10.3%) non-Swiss women. Of the population in the municipality 513 or about 26.4% were born in Obergösgen and lived there in 2000. There were 508 or 26.2% who were born in the same canton, while 514 or 26.5% were born somewhere else in Switzerland, and 360 or 18.5% were born outside of Switzerland.

In 2008 there were 11 live births to Swiss citizens and 7 births to non-Swiss citizens, and in same time span there were 12 deaths of Swiss citizens and 2 non-Swiss citizen deaths. Ignoring immigration and emigration, the population of Swiss citizens decreased by 1 while the foreign population increased by 5. There were 3 Swiss men and 3 Swiss women who immigrated back to Switzerland. At the same time, there were 12 non-Swiss men and 8 non-Swiss women who immigrated from another country to Switzerland. The total Swiss population change in 2008 (from all sources, including moves across municipal borders) was an increase of 3 and the non-Swiss population increased by 6 people. This represents a population growth rate of 0.4%.

The age distribution, as of 2000, in Obergösgen is; 138 children or 7.1% of the population are between 0 and 6 years old and 354 teenagers or 18.2% are between 7 and 19. Of the adult population, 108 people or 5.6% of the population are between 20 and 24 years old. 610 people or 31.4% are between 25 and 44, and 501 people or 25.8% are between 45 and 64. The senior population distribution is 187 people or 9.6% of the population are between 65 and 79 years old and there are 43 people or 2.2% who are over 80.

As of 2000, there were 793 people who were single and never married in the municipality. There were 944 married individuals, 98 widows or widowers and 106 individuals who are divorced.

As of 2000, there were 792 private households in the municipality, and an average of 2.4 persons per household. There were 230 households that consist of only one person and 54 households with five or more people. Out of a total of 804 households that answered this question, 28.6% were households made up of just one person and there were 8 adults who lived with their parents. Of the rest of the households, there are 240 married couples without children, 266 married couples with children There were 42 single parents with a child or children. There were 6 households that were made up of unrelated people and 12 households that were made up of some sort of institution or another collective housing.

In 2000 there were 284 single-family homes (or 70.8% of the total) out of a total of 401 inhabited buildings. There were 73 multi-family buildings (18.2%), along with 32 multi-purpose buildings that were mostly used for housing (8.0%) and 12 other use buildings (commercial or industrial) that also had some housing (3.0%). Of the single-family homes 17 were built before 1919, while 43 were built between 1990 and 2000. The greatest number of single-family homes (60) were built between 1946 and 1960.

In 2000 there were 841 apartments in the municipality. The most common apartment size was 4 rooms of which there were 311. There were 19 single-room apartments and 265 apartments with five or more rooms. Of these apartments, a total of 781 apartments (92.9% of the total) were permanently occupied, while 26 apartments (3.1%) were seasonally occupied and 34 apartments (4.0%) were empty. As of 2009, the construction rate of new housing units was 14 new units per 1000 residents. The vacancy rate for the municipality, in 2010, was 7.23%.

The historical population is given in the following chart:

== Politics ==
In the 2007 federal election the most popular party was the SP which received 30.77% of the vote. The next three most popular parties were the SVP (27.5%), the FDP (19.24%) and the CVP (14.63%). In the federal election, a total of 689 votes were cast, and the voter turnout was 51.2%.

== Economy ==
As of 2010, Obergösgen had an unemployment rate of 4.7%. As of 2008, there were 20 people employed in the primary economic sector and about 8 businesses involved in this sector. 73 people were employed in the secondary sector and there were 15 businesses in this sector. 308 people were employed in the tertiary sector, with 54 businesses in this sector. There were 1,037 residents of the municipality who were employed in some capacity, of which females made up 43.4% of the workforce.

In 2008 the total number of full-time equivalent jobs was 323. The number of jobs in the primary sector was 16, all of which were in agriculture. The number of jobs in the secondary sector was 62 of which 27 or (43.5%) were in manufacturing and 35 (56.5%) were in construction. The number of jobs in the tertiary sector was 245. In the tertiary sector; 41 or 16.7% were in wholesale or retail sales or the repair of motor vehicles, 79 or 32.2% were in the movement and storage of goods, 31 or 12.7% were in a hotel or restaurant, 8 or 3.3% were in the information industry, 2 or 0.8% were the insurance or financial industry, 26 or 10.6% were technical professionals or scientists, 40 or 16.3% were in education and 3 or 1.2% were in health care.

In 2000, there were 233 workers who commuted into the municipality and 851 workers who commuted away. The municipality is a net exporter of workers, with about 3.7 workers leaving the municipality for every one entering. Of the working population, 19.7% used public transportation to get to work, and 60.4% used a private car.

== Religion ==
From the 2000 census, 807 or 41.6% were Roman Catholic, while 542 or 27.9% belonged to the Swiss Reformed Church. Of the rest of the population, there were 29 members of an Orthodox church (or about 1.49% of the population), there were 27 individuals (or about 1.39% of the population) who belonged to the Christian Catholic Church, and there were 34 individuals (or about 1.75% of the population) who belonged to another Christian church. There were 5 individuals (or about 0.26% of the population) who were Jewish, and 165 (or about 8.50% of the population) who were Islamic. There were 13 individuals who were Buddhist and 3 individuals who were Hindu. 263 (or about 13.55% of the population) belonged to no church, are agnostic or atheist, and 53 individuals (or about 2.73% of the population) did not answer the question.

== Education ==
In Obergösgen about 755 or (38.9%) of the population have completed non-mandatory upper secondary education, and 156 or (8.0%) have completed additional higher education (either university or a Fachhochschule). Of the 156 who completed tertiary schooling, 70.5% were Swiss men, 19.2% were Swiss women, 7.7% were non-Swiss men.

During the 2010-2011 school year there were a total of 157 students in the Obergösgen school system. The education system in the Canton of Solothurn allows young children to attend two years of non-obligatory Kindergarten. During that school year, there were 41 children in kindergarten. The canton's school system requires students to attend six years of primary school, with some of the children attending smaller, specialized classes. In the municipality there were 116 students in primary school. The secondary school program consists of three lower, obligatory years of schooling, followed by three to five years of optional, advanced schools. All the lower secondary students from Obergösgen attend their school in a neighboring municipality.

As of 2000, there were 219 students in Obergösgen who came from another municipality, while 47 residents attended schools outside the municipality.
