= Walterswil, Solothurn =

Walterswil
- Municipality
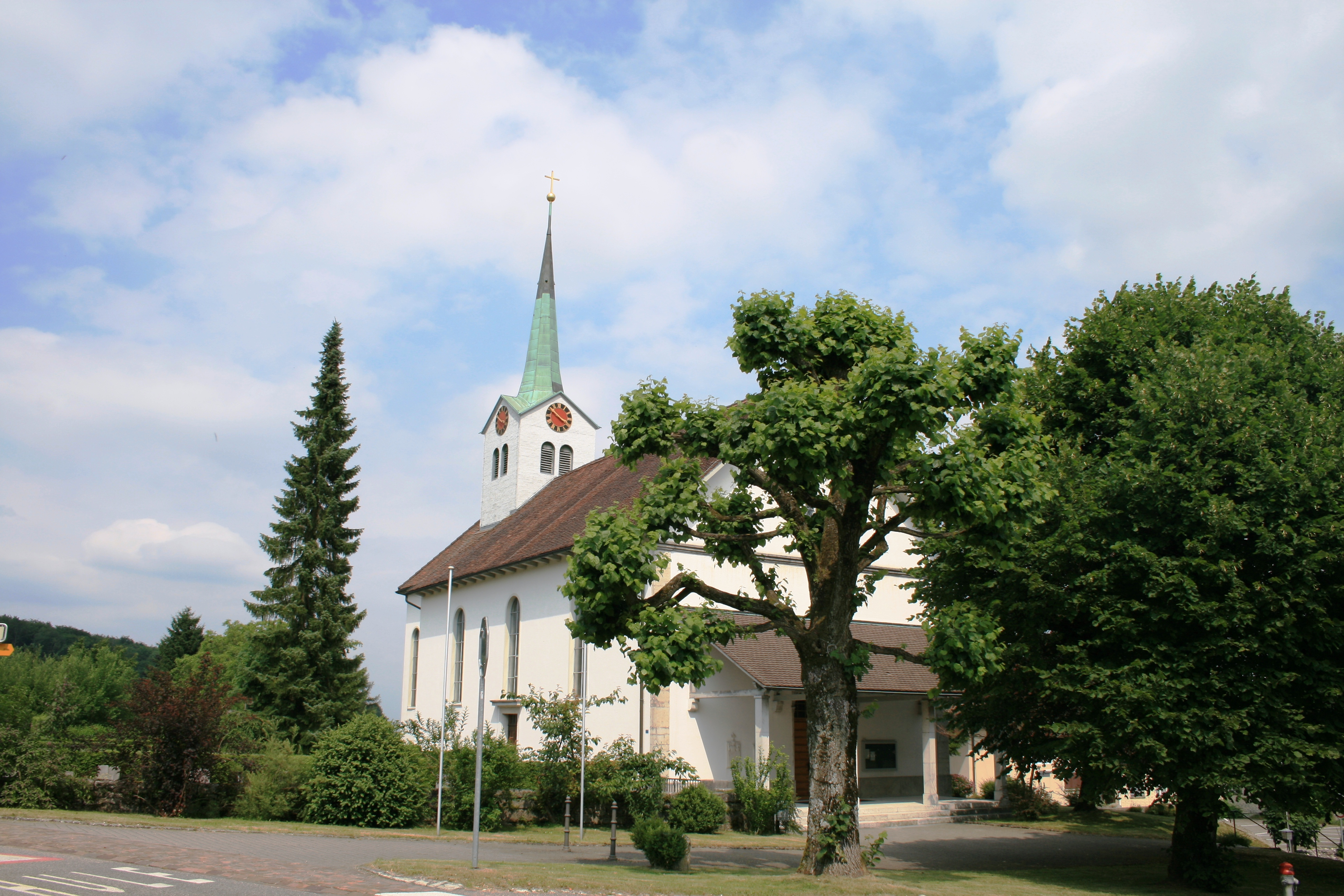
- Walterswil village and church

- Coat of arms
- Location of Walterswil
- Location within Switzerland Location within Canton of Solothurn
- Coordinates: 47°20′N 7°58′E
- Country: Switzerland
- Canton: Solothurn
- District: Olten

Area
  - Total: 4.48 km^{2} (1.73 sq mi)
- Elevation: 465 m (1,526 ft)

Population (December 2020)
  - Total: 743
  - Density: 166/km^{2} (430/sq mi)
- Time zone: UTC+01:00 (CET)
  - Summer (DST): UTC+02:00 (CEST)
- Postal code: 5746
- SFOS number: 2585
- ISO 3166 code: CH-SO
- Surrounded by: Däniken, Dulliken, Gretzenbach, Oftringen (AG), Safenwil (AG)
- Website: walterswil.ch

Walterswil is a municipality in the district of Olten in the canton of Solothurn in Switzerland.

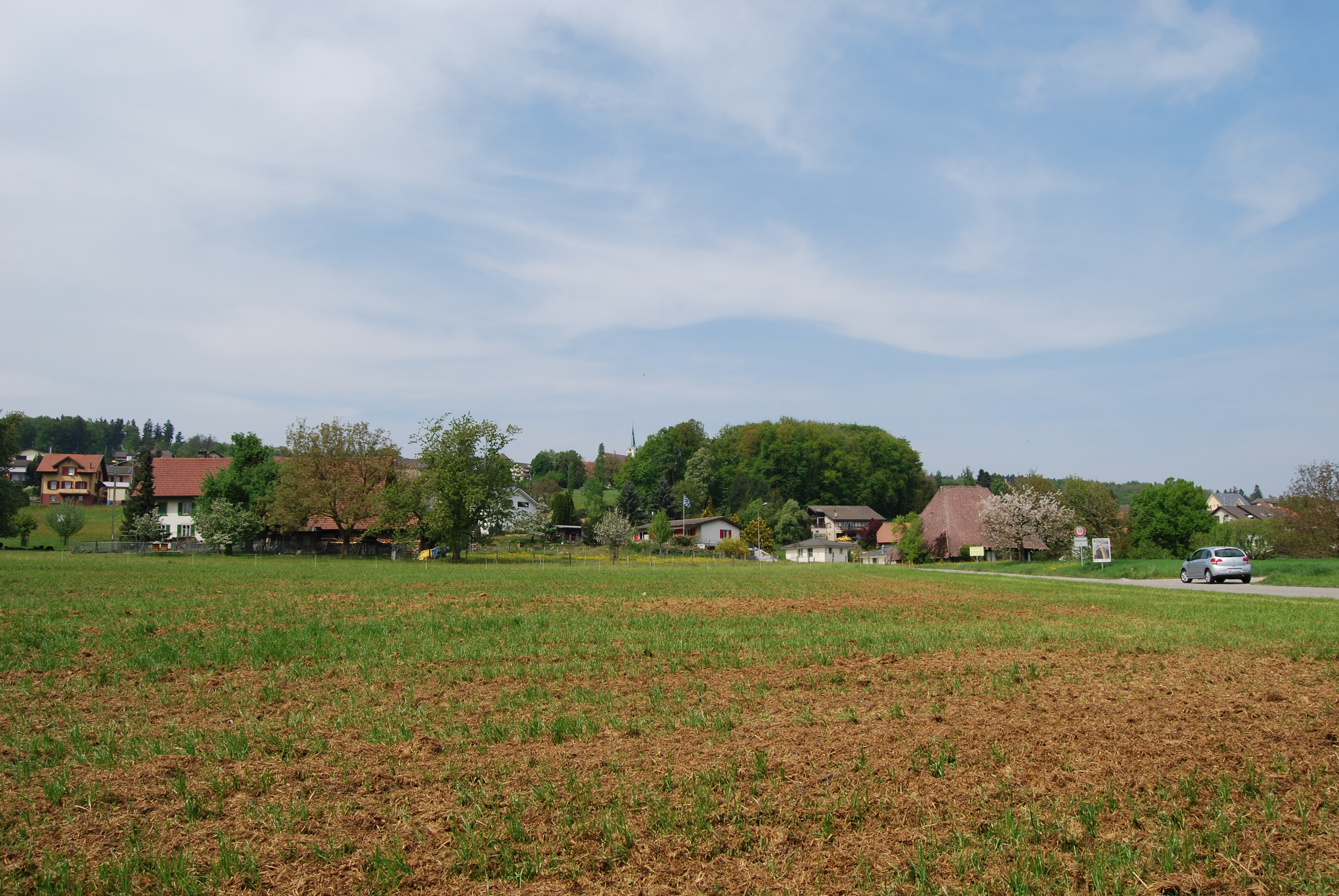
Walterswil, from south

== Geography ==
Walterswil has an area, as of 2009, of 4.48 square kilometers (1.73 sq mi). Of this area, 2.39 km^{2} (0.92 sq mi) or 53.3% is used for agricultural purposes, while 1.62 km^{2} (0.63 sq mi) or 36.2% is forested. Of the rest of the land, 0.48 km^{2} (0.19 sq mi) or 10.7% is settled (buildings or roads) and 0.02 km^{2} (4.9 acres) or 0.4% is unproductive land.

Of the built up area, housing and buildings made up 4.7% and transportation infrastructure made up 4.7%. Power and water infrastructure as well as other special developed areas made up 1.3% of the area out of the forested land, all of the forested land area is covered with heavy forests. Of the agricultural land, 31.7% is used for growing crops and 19.2% is pastures, while 2.5% is used for orchards or vine crops.

== Coat of arms ==
The blazon of the municipal coat of arms is Per fess Gules and Argent a Bend counterchanged and in the second a Juniper Branch proper.

== Demographics ==
Walterswil has a population (as of December 2020) of 743. As of 2008, 5.7% of the population are resident foreign nationals. Over the last 10 years (1999–2009) the population has changed at a rate of -0.4%.

Most of the population (as of 2000) speaks German (621 or 98.3%), with French being second most common (2 or 0.3%) and English being third (2 or 0.3%).

As of 2008, the gender distribution of the population was 51.9% male and 48.1% female. The population was made up of 338 Swiss men (48.1% of the population) and 27 (3.8%) non-Swiss men. There were 320 Swiss women (45.5%) and 18 (2.6%) non-Swiss women. Of the population in the municipality 192 or about 30.4% were born in Walterswil and lived there in 2000. There were 67 or 10.6% who were born in the same canton, while 336 or 53.2% were born somewhere else in Switzerland, and 30 or 4.7% were born outside of Switzerland.

In 2008 there were 3 live births to Swiss citizens and there were 4 deaths of Swiss citizens. Ignoring immigration and emigration, the population of Swiss citizens decreased by 1 while the foreign population remained the same. There was 1 Swiss man who immigrated back to Switzerland. At the same time, there were 2 non-Swiss men and 2 non-Swiss women who immigrated from another country to Switzerland. The total Swiss population change in 2008 (from all sources, including moves across municipal borders) was a decrease of 12 and the non-Swiss population remained the same. This represents a population growth rate of -1.7%.

The age distribution, as of 2000, in Walterswil is; 54 children or 8.5% of the population are between 0 and 6 years old and 106 teenagers or 16.8% are between 7 and 19. Of the adult population, 29 people or 4.6% of the population are between 20 and 24 years old. 192 people or 30.4% are between 25 and 44, and 151 people or 23.9% are between 45 and 64. The senior population distribution is 79 people or 12.5% of the population are between 65 and 79 years old and there are 21 people or 3.3% who are over 80.

As of 2000, there were 268 people who were single and never married in the municipality. There were 317 married individuals, 26 widows or widowers and 21 individuals who are divorced.

As of 2000, there were 265 private households in the municipality, and an average of 2.4 persons per household. There were 80 households that consist of only one person and 21 households with five or more people. Out of a total of 267 households that answered this question, 30.0% were households made up of just one person and there were 5 adults who lived with their parents. Of the rest of the households, there are 79 married couples without children, 84 married couples with children There were 15 single parents with a child or children. There were 2 households that were made up of unrelated people and 2 households that were made up of some sort of institution or another collective housing.

In 2000 there were 149 single family homes (or 68.7% of the total) out of a total of 217 inhabited buildings. There were 24 multi-family buildings (11.1%), along with 40 multi-purpose buildings that were mostly used for housing (18.4%) and 4 other use buildings (commercial or industrial) that also had some housing (1.8%). Of the single family homes 18 were built before 1919, while 18 were built between 1990 and 2000. The greatest number of single family homes (35) were built between 1981 and 1990.

In 2000 there were 281 apartments in the municipality. The most common apartment size was 5 rooms of which there were 82. There were 2 single room apartments and 133 apartments with five or more rooms. Of these apartments, a total of 247 apartments (87.9% of the total) were permanently occupied, while 18 apartments (6.4%) were seasonally occupied and 16 apartments (5.7%) were empty. As of 2009, the construction rate of new housing units was 2.9 new units per 1000 residents. The vacancy rate for the municipality, in 2010, was 1.37%.

The historical population is given in the following chart:

== Politics ==
In the 2007 federal election the most popular party was the SVP which received 36.98% of the vote. The next three most popular parties were the CVP (27.1%), the FDP (15.24%) and the Green Party (8.55%). In the federal election, a total of 229 votes were cast, and the voter turnout was 41.4%.

== Economy ==
As of 2010, Walterswil had an unemployment rate of 3.4%. As of 2008, there were 36 people employed in the primary economic sector and about 16 businesses involved in this sector. 11 people were employed in the secondary sector and there were 5 businesses in this sector. 58 people were employed in the tertiary sector, with 12 businesses in this sector. There were 335 residents of the municipality who were employed in some capacity, of which females made up 41.8% of the workforce.

In 2008 the total number of full-time equivalent jobs was 82. The number of jobs in the primary sector was 22, all of which were in agriculture. The number of jobs in the secondary sector was 9 of which 1 was in manufacturing and 8 (88.9%) were in construction. The number of jobs in the tertiary sector was 51. In the tertiary sector; 38 or 74.5% were in wholesale or retail sales or the repair of motor vehicles, 10 or 19.6% were in a hotel or restaurant, 2 or 3.9% were technical professionals or scientists, .

In 2000, there were 21 workers who commuted into the municipality and 269 workers who commuted away. The municipality is a net exporter of workers, with about 12.8 workers leaving the municipality for every one entering. Of the working population, 8.1% used public transportation to get to work, and 68.1% used a private car.

== Religion ==
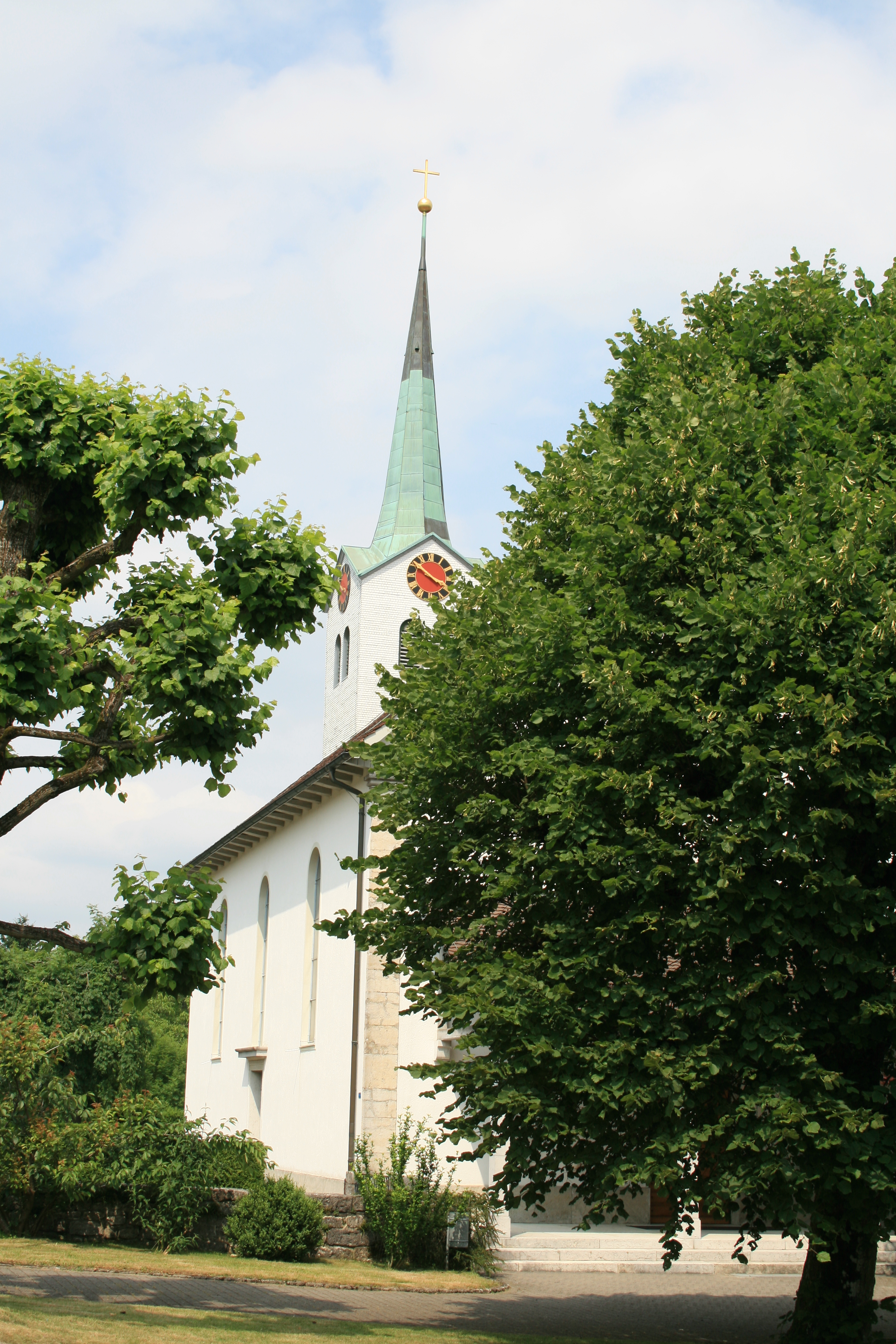
Walterswil church

From the 2000 census, 241 or 38.1% were Roman Catholic, while 262 or 41.5% belonged to the Swiss Reformed Church. Of the rest of the population, there were 7 individuals (or about 1.11% of the population) who belonged to the Christian Catholic Church, and there were 14 individuals (or about 2.22% of the population) who belonged to another Christian church. There were 3 (or about 0.47% of the population) who were Islamic. 93 (or about 14.72% of the population) belonged to no church, are agnostic or atheist, and 12 individuals (or about 1.90% of the population) did not answer the question.

== Education ==
In Walterswil about 276 or (43.7%) of the population have completed non-mandatory upper secondary education, and 43 or (6.8%) have completed additional higher education (either university or a Fachhochschule). Of the 43 who completed tertiary schooling, 69.8% were Swiss men, 27.9% were Swiss women.

As of 2000, there were 56 students from Walterswil who attended schools outside the municipality.
