= Eppenberg-Wöschnau =

- Municipality
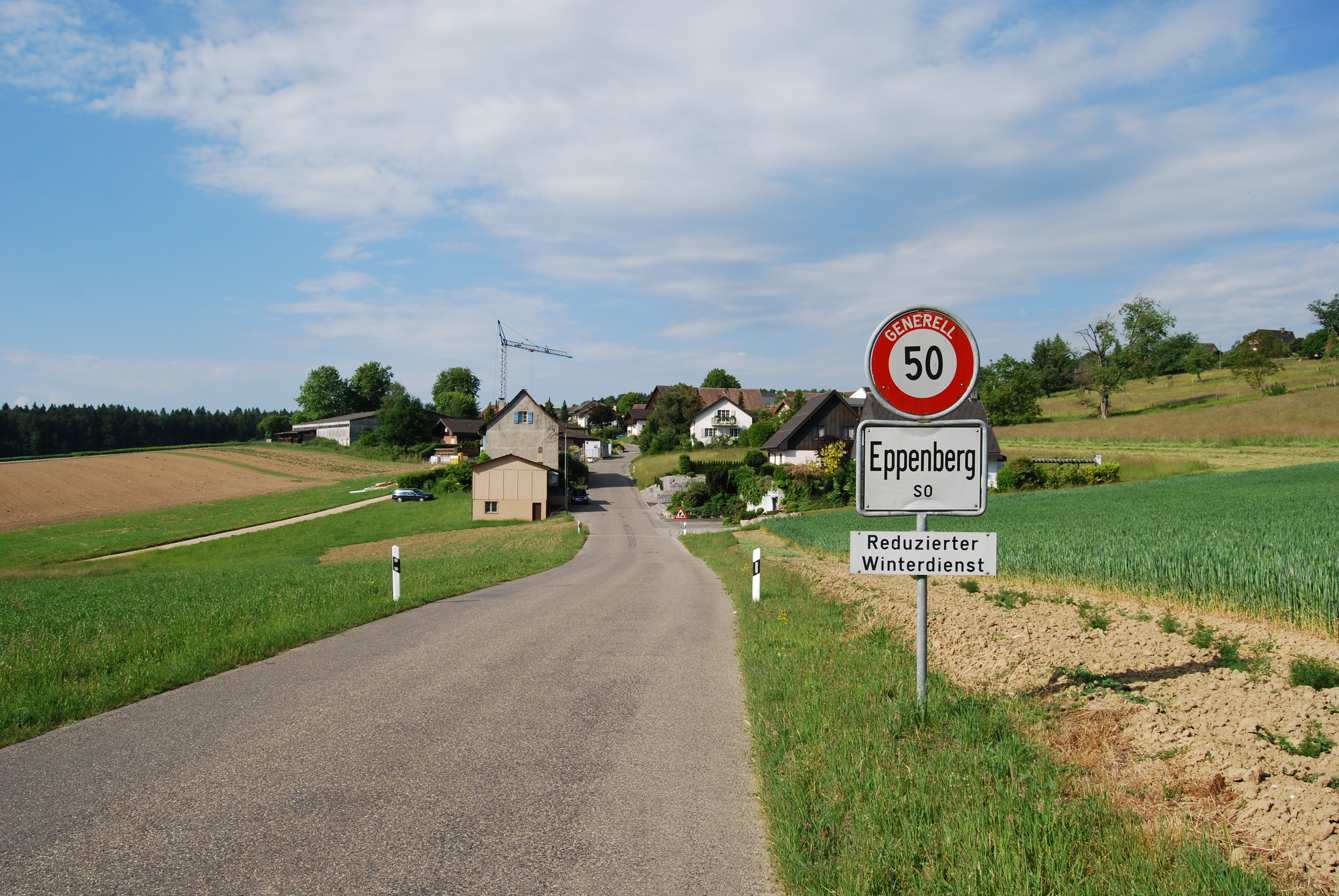

- Coat of arms
- Location of Eppenberg-Wöschnau
- Location within Switzerland Location within Canton of Solothurn
- Coordinates: 47°23′N 8°2′E
- Country: Switzerland
- Canton: Solothurn
- District: Olten

Area
  - Total: 1.81 km^{2} (0.70 sq mi)
- Elevation: 459 m (1,506 ft)

Population (December 2020)
  - Total: 311
  - Density: 172/km^{2} (445/sq mi)
- Time zone: UTC+01:00 (CET)
  - Summer (DST): UTC+02:00 (CEST)
- Postal code: 5012
- SFOS number: 2574
- ISO 3166 code: CH-SO
- Surrounded by: Aarau (AG), Niedererlinsbach, Schönenwerd, Unterentfelden (AG)
- Website: http://www.eppenberg-woeschnau.ch SFSO statistics

Eppenberg-Wöschnau is a municipality in the district of Olten in the canton of Solothurn in Switzerland.

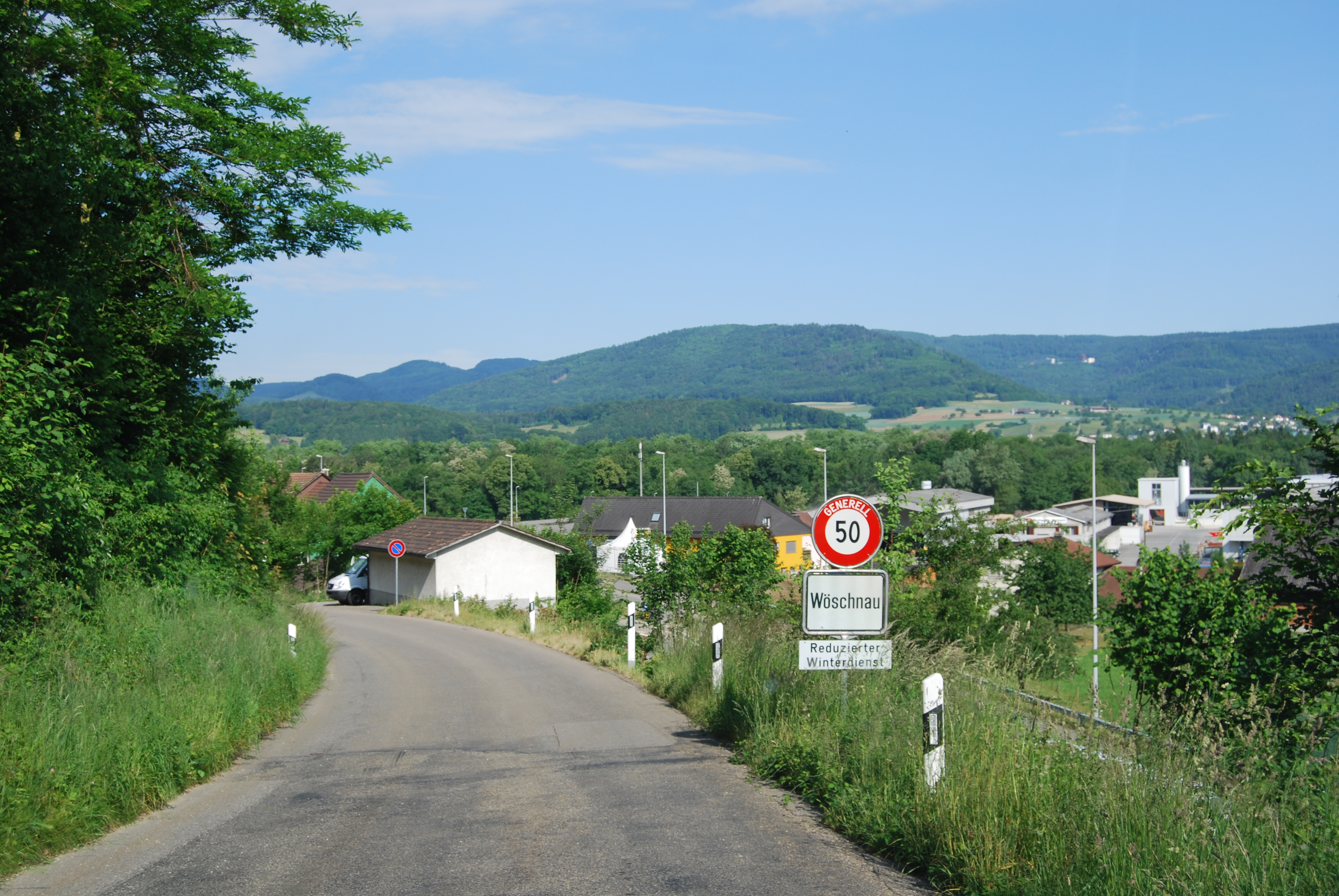
Wöschnau

== History ==
Eppenberg is first mentioned in 1294 as in Eppenberg. At the same time, Wöschnau was mentioned as in Weschnowe.

== Geography ==
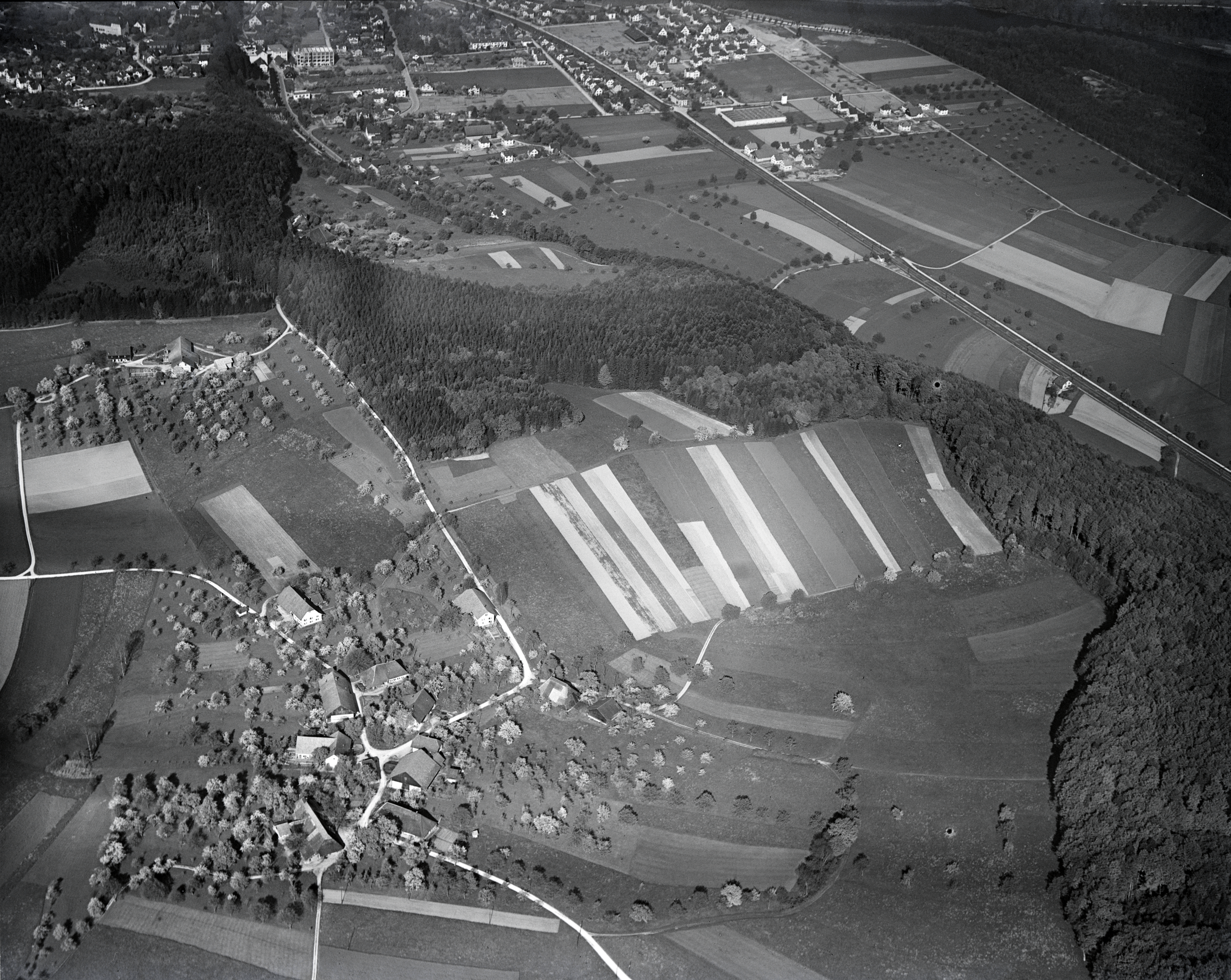
Aerial view from 300 m by Walter Mittelholzer (1930)

Eppenberg-Wöschnau has an area, as of 2009, of 1.81 square kilometers (0.70 sq mi). Of this area, 0.66 km^{2} (0.25 sq mi) or 36.5% is used for agricultural purposes, while 0.79 km^{2} (0.31 sq mi) or 43.6% is forested. Of the rest of the land, 0.33 km^{2} (0.13 sq mi) or 18.2% is settled (buildings or roads), 0.05 km^{2} (12 acres) or 2.8% is either rivers or lakes.

Of the built up area, industrial buildings made up 5.0% of the total area while housing and buildings made up 3.9% and transportation infrastructure made up 6.6%. while parks, green belts and sports fields made up 2.8%. Out of the forested land, 42.5% of the total land area is heavily forested and 1.1% is covered with orchards or small clusters of trees. Of the agricultural land, 26.0% is used for growing crops and 9.9% is pastures. All the water in the municipality is flowing water.

The municipality is located in the Olten district, on the border with the Canton of Aargau. Eppenberg, in a clearing on a high plateau, is a mostly agricultural village. Wöschnau is located on a small terrace along the Aare river and is a suburb of Aarau with several small businesses.

== Coat of arms ==
The blazon of the municipal coat of arms is Tierced per fess Gules, Argent and Sable overall a Sickle Azure handled Or.

== Demographics ==
Eppenberg-Wöschnau has a population (as of December 2020) of 311. As of 2008, 32.4% of the population are resident foreign nationals. Over the last 10 years (1999–2009 ) the population has changed at a rate of -11.3%.

Most of the population (as of 2000) speaks German (268 or 81.0%), with Serbo-Croatian being second most common (16 or 4.8%) and Italian being third (14 or 4.2%). There are 2 people who speak French and 1 person who speaks Romansh.

As of 2008, the gender distribution of the population was 55.2% male and 44.8% female. The population was made up of 105 Swiss men (35.4% of the population) and 59 (19.9%) non-Swiss men. There were 106 Swiss women (35.7%) and 27 (9.1%) non-Swiss women. Of the population in the municipality 74 or about 22.4% were born in Eppenberg-Wöschnau and lived there in 2000. There were 45 or 13.6% who were born in the same canton, while 122 or 36.9% were born somewhere else in Switzerland, and 87 or 26.3% were born outside of Switzerland.

In 2008 there was 1 death of a Swiss citizen and 1 non-Swiss citizen death. Ignoring immigration and emigration, the population of Swiss citizens decreased by 1 while the foreign population decreased by 1. There was 1 Swiss man and 2 Swiss women who immigrated back to Switzerland. At the same time, there were 2 non-Swiss men and 2 non-Swiss women who immigrated from another country to Switzerland. The total Swiss population change in 2008 (from all sources, including moves across municipal borders) was a decrease of 5 and the non-Swiss population increased by 9 people. This represents a population growth rate of 1.3%.

The age distribution, as of 2000, in Eppenberg-Wöschnau is; 22 children or 6.6% of the population are between 0 and 6 years old and 50 teenagers or 15.1% are between 7 and 19. Of the adult population, 26 people or 7.9% of the population are between 20 and 24 years old. 91 people or 27.5% are between 25 and 44, and 101 people or 30.5% are between 45 and 64. The senior population distribution is 33 people or 10.0% of the population are between 65 and 79 years old and there are 8 people or 2.4% who are over 80.

As of 2000, there were 132 people who were single and never married in the municipality. There were 164 married individuals, 14 widows or widowers and 21 individuals who are divorced.

As of 2000, there were 137 private households in the municipality, and an average of 2.4 persons per household. There were 40 households that consist of only one person and 13 households with five or more people. Out of a total of 138 households that answered this question, 29.0% were households made up of just one person and there were 2 adults who lived with their parents. Of the rest of the households, there are 40 married couples without children, 44 married couples with children There were 9 single parents with a child or children. There were 2 households that were made up of unrelated people and 1 household that was made up of some sort of institution or another collective housing.

In 2000 there were 49 single family homes (or 58.3% of the total) out of a total of 84 inhabited buildings. There were 20 multi-family buildings (23.8%), along with 7 multi-purpose buildings that were mostly used for housing (8.3%) and 8 other use buildings (commercial or industrial) that also had some housing (9.5%). Of the single family homes 1 were built before 1919, while 2 were built between 1990 and 2000. The greatest number of single family homes (14) were built between 1971 and 1980.

In 2000 there were 169 apartments in the municipality. The most common apartment size was 3 rooms of which there were 72. There were 2 single room apartments and 48 apartments with five or more rooms. Of these apartments, a total of 132 apartments (78.1% of the total) were permanently occupied, while 14 apartments (8.3%) were seasonally occupied and 23 apartments (13.6%) were empty. As of 2009, the construction rate of new housing units was 3.4 new units per 1000 residents. The vacancy rate for the municipality, in 2010, was 7.02%.

The historical population is given in the following chart:

== Heritage sites of national significance ==
The Iron Age hilltop settlement of Buechholz is listed as a Swiss heritage site of national significance.

== Politics ==
In the 2007 federal election the most popular party was the SVP which received 31.88% of the vote. The next three most popular parties were the SP (20.87%), the CVP (16.89%) and the FDP (14.99%). In the federal election, a total of 76 votes were cast, and the voter turnout was 39.2%.

== Economy ==
As of 2010, Eppenberg-Wöschnau had an unemployment rate of 3.8%. As of 2008, there were 9 people employed in the primary economic sector and about 4 businesses involved in this sector. 101 people were employed in the secondary sector and there were 4 businesses in this sector. 46 people were employed in the tertiary sector, with 9 businesses in this sector. There were 181 residents of the municipality who were employed in some capacity, of which females made up 42.0% of the workforce.

In 2008 the total number of full-time equivalent jobs was 139. The number of jobs in the primary sector was 6, all of which were in agriculture. The number of jobs in the secondary sector was 97 of which 24 or (24.7%) were in manufacturing and 73 (75.3%) were in construction. The number of jobs in the tertiary sector was 36. In the tertiary sector; 26 or 72.2% were in wholesale or retail sales or the repair of motor vehicles, 8 or 22.2% were in a hotel or restaurant, 1 was a technical professional or scientist, .

In 2000, there were 145 workers who commuted into the municipality and 147 workers who commuted away. The municipality is a net exporter of workers, with about 1.0 workers leaving the municipality for every one entering. Of the working population, 21% used public transportation to get to work, and 55.8% used a private car.

== Religion ==
From the 2000 census, 103 or 31.1% were Roman Catholic, while 87 or 26.3% belonged to the Swiss Reformed Church. Of the rest of the population, there were 8 members of an Orthodox church (or about 2.42% of the population), there were 4 individuals (or about 1.21% of the population) who belonged to the Christian Catholic Church, and there were 7 individuals (or about 2.11% of the population) who belonged to another Christian church. There were 32 (or about 9.67% of the population) who were Islamic. There was 1 person who was Hindu and 1 individual who belonged to another church. 88 (or about 26.59% of the population) belonged to no church, are agnostic or atheist.

== Education ==
In Eppenberg-Wöschnau about 140 or (42.3%) of the population have completed non-mandatory upper secondary education, and 25 or (7.6%) have completed additional higher education (either university or a Fachhochschule). Of the 25 who completed tertiary schooling, 52.0% were Swiss men, 12.0% were Swiss women, 20.0% were non-Swiss men.

As of 2000, there were 43 students from Eppenberg-Wöschnau who attended schools outside the municipality.
