= Olten–Aarau railway line =

Railway line in Switzerland

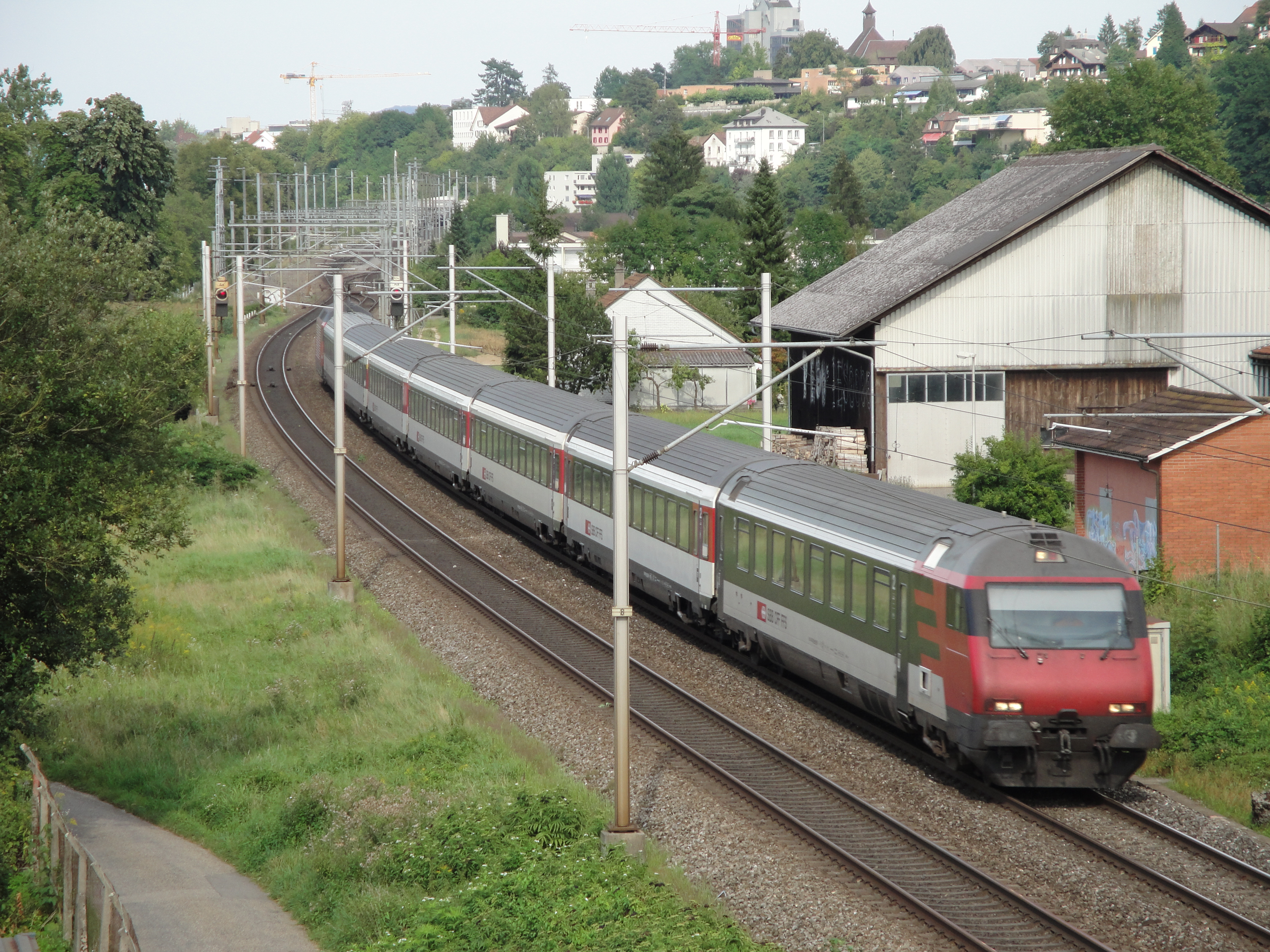
- An InterRegio service to Bern has just left Aarau running towards Olten

Overview
- Line number: 650, 650.1
- Locale: Switzerland
- Termini: Olten; Aarau

Technical
- Line length: 13.40 km (8.33 mi)
- Number of tracks: 2-4
- Track gauge: 1,435 mm (4 ft 8 1/2 in)
- Electrification: 15 kV/16.7 Hz AC overhead catenary
- Maximum incline: 1.0%

Olten–Aarau railway line is a railway line in the north of Switzerland. It runs from Olten along the Aare to Aarau.

== Route ==
The line runs to the north from Olten station, then runs in a wide arc to the southeast and swerves towards Dulliken. Next, the line then runs mainly to the northeast along the Aare. The line passes under part of the town of Aarau through the Aarau city tunnel, which is immediately followed by Aarau station. With the exception of the city tunnel, the line has no major engineering structures.

North of Olten, two lines branch off to Basel (Hauenstein summit tunnel and Hauenstein base tunnel). The line to Aarau can also be reached directly from the base tunnel line via a connecting curve.

The extensive track layouts of a former postal distribution centre and a former SBB freight depot, which is now operated privately as a "Cargo Service Center", lie to the south of the line between Dulliken and Däniken.

== History ==
In the 19th century, the still young federal state left the organisation of railways to the cantons, which in turn licensed the construction and operation of railways to private companies. While the cantons of Zurich and Aarau wanted a connection between Zurich and Basel either via the Bözberg Pass (the preference of Aargau) or via Waldshut and continuing on the German side of the Rhine (the preference of Zürich), Basel advocated a railway junction in Olten, from which lines would run to Basel, Zurich, Lucerne, Bern and Biel. This was also the recommendation of a report, which was produced in 1850 by the well-known English railway engineers Robert Stephenson and Henry Swinburne.

The Zurich preference was not carried out (at least for the time being), since after the completion of the Swiss Northern Railway (Spanisch-Brötli-Bahn), there were financial problems. The Aargau preference (the Bözberg line) failed because the canton of Basel-Land did not issue a license for its construction.

In Basel, the Swiss Central Railway was established to build the basic railway network. The Central Railway received in particular a license for the construction and operation of the line from Olten to Wöschnau on the border of the cantons of Solothurn and Aarau, but not for the remaining short section from Wöschnau to Aarau itself. This, as well as an extension in an easterly direction to Zurich, was awarded to the Swiss Northern Railway, which operated the Zürich–Baden line.

Thus, the line from Olten was built to the gates of Aarau by the Central Railway; this was put into operation on 9 June 1856. However, since the Swiss Northeastern Railway had not completed its line from Baden, it initially built a temporary station in Schachen Aarau. Once the Northeastern Railway had completed the Aarau City Tunnel in June 1858—the line from Baden had meanwhile also reached Aarau—continuous operations were possible on the Olten–Aarau–Zürich route.

A few years later, duplication of the Olten–Zürich line was completed on 16 July 1872. The electrification with the usual Swiss Federal Railways (SBB) 15 kV 16 2/3 Hz system was completed on 21 January 1925. Until the nationalisation of the large private railway companies to form the SBB, the Central Railway was responsible for the operation of the line.

In the 1990s, the track layout of Aarau station was completely rebuilt. In particular, the western approach was rebuilt as four tracks and a second city tunnel was built. However, the continuation of the line to Däniken was still double-track. This was a major bottleneck for east-west traffic. The extension of four tracks through Schönenwerd was not considered possible because of the dense development. In 2015, work began on the construction of the Eppenberg Tunnel to bypass Schönenwerd and it was commissioned on 12 October 2020.
