= Bözberg =

- Municipality
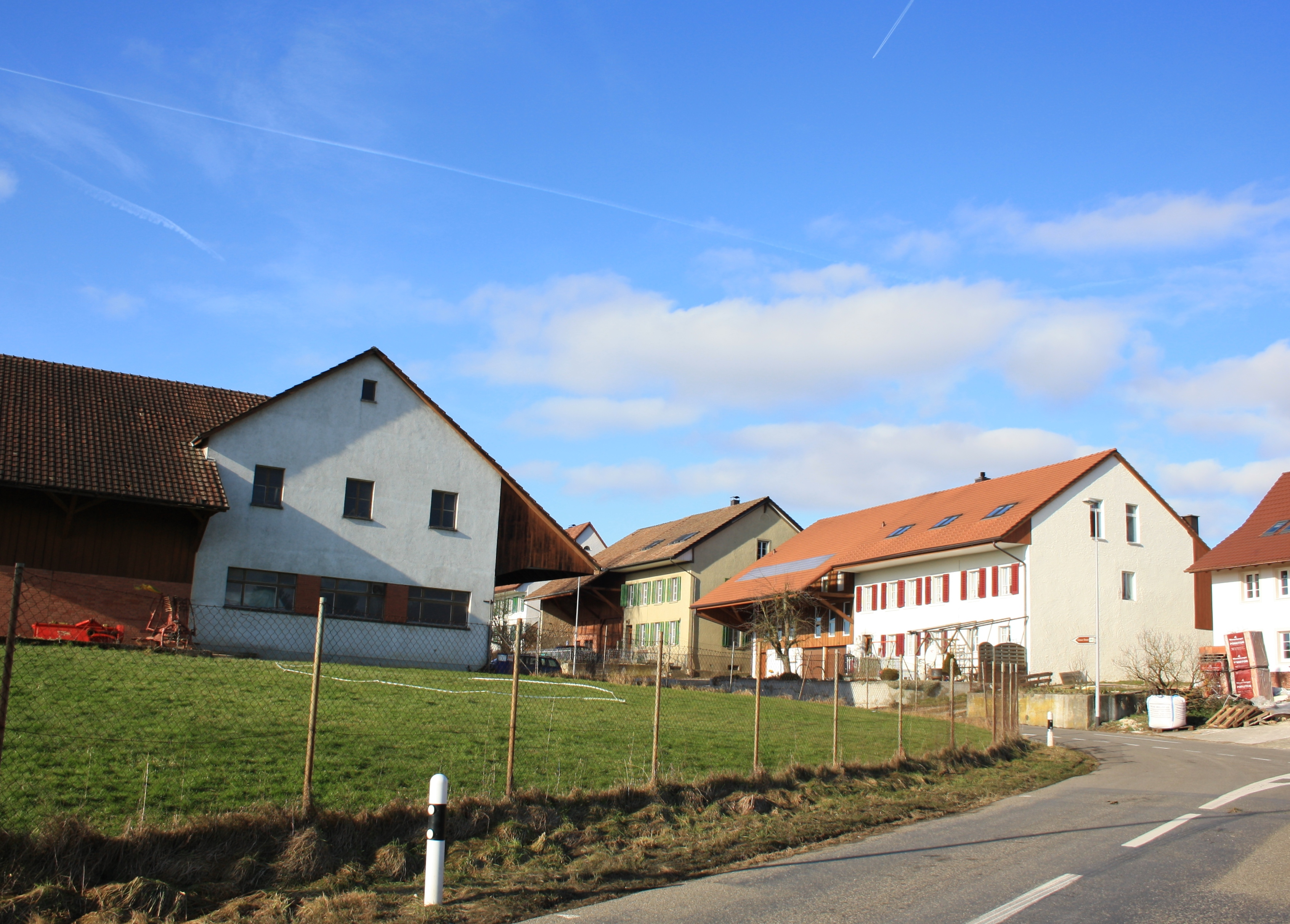
- Oberbözberg village

- Flag Coat of arms
- Location of Bözberg
- Location within Switzerland Location within Canton of Aargau
- Coordinates: 47°30′N 8°9′E
- Country: Switzerland
- Canton: Aargau
- District: Brugg

Area
  - Total: 15.52 km^{2} (5.99 sq mi)
- Elevation: 540 m (1,770 ft)

Population (Dec 2011)
  - Total: 1,503
  - Density: 96.84/km^{2} (250.8/sq mi)
- Time zone: UTC+01:00 (CET)
  - Summer (DST): UTC+02:00 (CEST)
- Postal code: 5224/5
- SFOS number: 4124
- ISO 3166 code: CH-AG
- Surrounded by: Effingen, Mönthal, Remigen, Riniken
- Website: https://www.boezberg.ch/ SFSO statistics

Bözberg is a municipality in the district of Brugg in canton of Aargau in Switzerland. It ceased to exist in 1873, when it was split into the two new municipalities Oberbözberg and Unterbözberg. On 1 January 2013 the former municipalities of Gallenkirch, Linn, Oberbözberg and Unterbözberg merged to form the new municipality of Bözberg.

== History ==
=== Gallenkirch ===
Gallenkirch is first mentioned in 1338 as Gallenkilch. During the Middle Ages, Gallenkirch was part of the district of Hornussen under the city of Bad Säckingen. Religiously, until the Reformation the residents were also part of the parish of Hornussen. The local chapel was dedicated to Saint Gall, but is no longer standing. Portions of the structure were incorporated into a later building. After the Reformation the village became part of the reformed parish of Bözberg. Under Bernese rule (1460-1798) the village was part of the Thalheim court. In the 19th and 20th century, several attempts to merge Gallenkirch into the village of Linn failed. However, since 1917, children attend the local school in Linn, and other infrastructure problems are solved through inter-municipal cooperation. In Gallenkirch there is no shopping or other economy. Today's inhabitants are farmers or commuters to the nearby industrial centers.

=== Linn ===
Linn is first mentioned around 1303-08 as ze Linne. In 1307 it was mentioned as ze Lind. The name is probably connected with the 500- to 800-year-old, legendary Linden tree which is east of Linn. In the Middle Ages it probably belonged to the vogtei of Elfingen. In 1460 it was incorporated as part of the court of Bözberg in the Canton of Bern.

Initially, its inhabitants were part of the Elfingen-Bözen parish, and after 1649 the Bözberg parish. Before the Reformation in 1528, it possessed a chapel.

Agriculture was the major economic activity up into the middle of the 19th century. Due to declining opportunities in the mid-19th century, many of the farming families migrated away. By the end of the 20th century there were seven farms, while most other workers in the region were working in Brugg. Since the 1990s, Linn has been accessible by Postauto.

=== Oberbözberg ===
Aerial view (1950)

Oberbözberg is first mentioned in 1189 as Bozeberch. Until 1873, the municipality was part of Bözberg, which split into Oberbözberg and Unterbözberg.

=== Unterbözberg ===
Unterbözberg is first mentioned in 1189 as Bozeberch.

== Geography ==
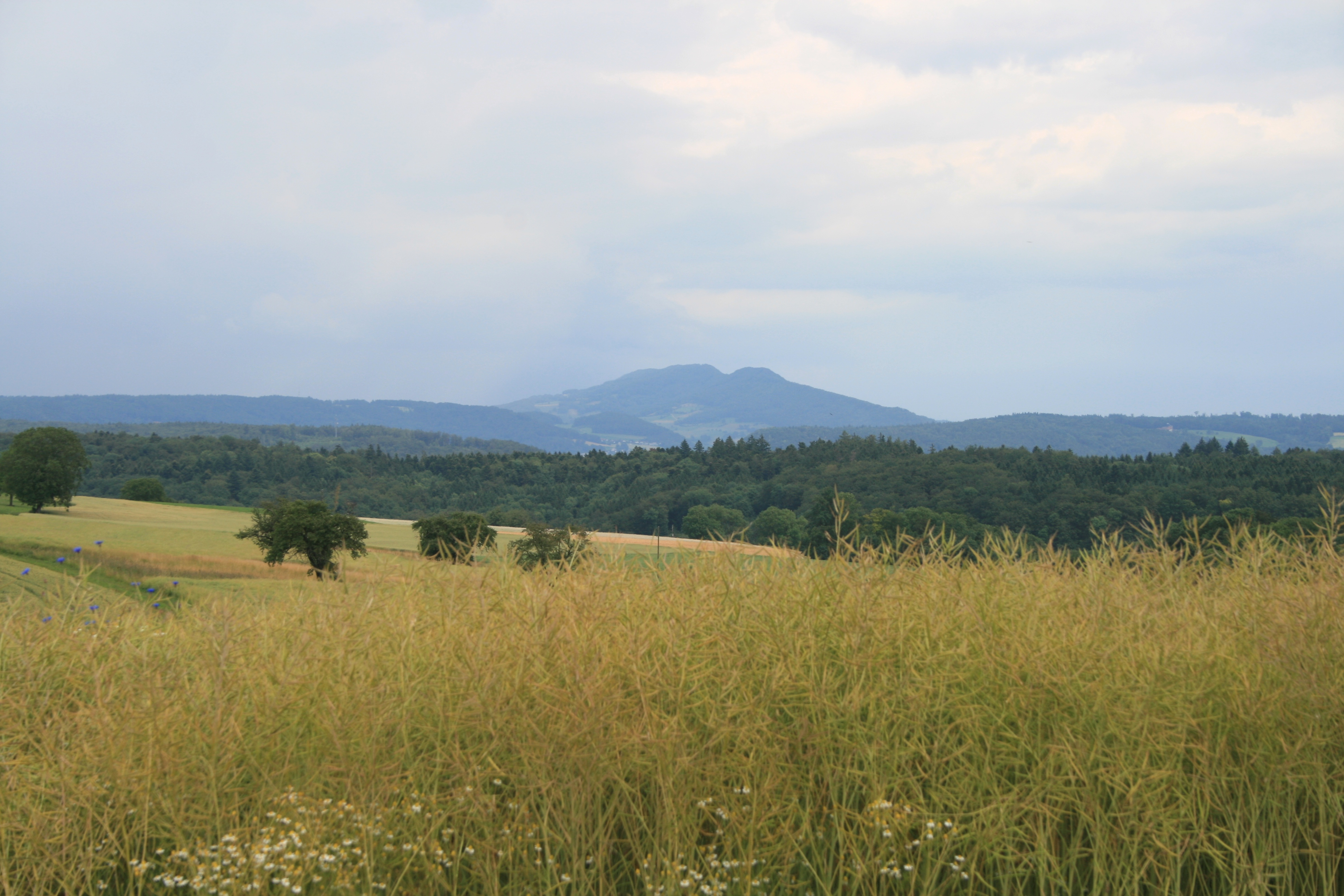
View from the Bözberg toward Lägern.

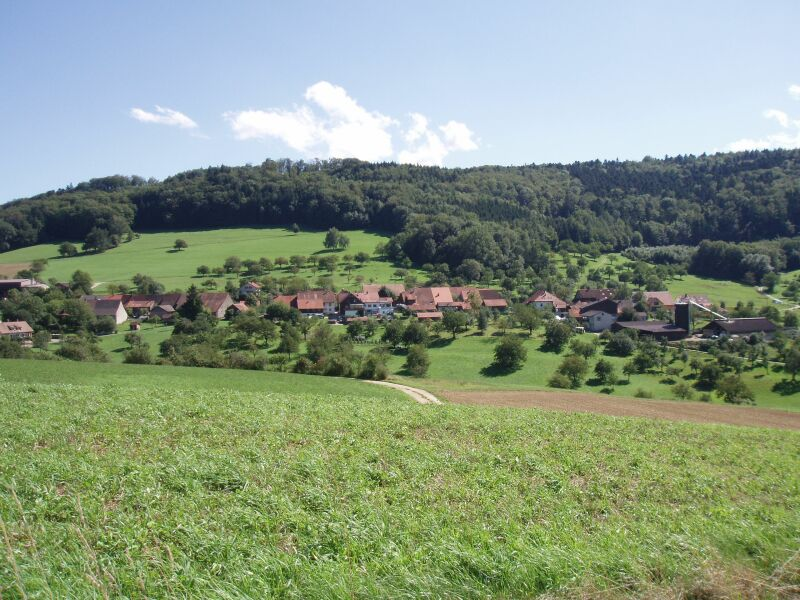
Linn village and surrounding fields.

The former municipalities that now make up Bözberg have a total combined area of 15.5 km^{2} (5.98 sq mi).

Gallenkirch had an area, as of 2009, of 1.4 square kilometers (0.54 sq mi). Of this area, 1.04 square kilometers (0.40 sq mi) or 74.3% is used for agricultural purposes, while 0.26 square kilometers (0.10 sq mi) or 18.6% is forested. Of the rest of the land, 0.1 km^{2} (25 acres) or 7.1% is settled (buildings or roads). The former municipality is located west of the mountain pass through which the modern Bözbergstrasse runs. Gallenkirch is 5 kilometers (3.1 mi) from downtown Brugg, the district seat. The former municipality is bounded with Unterbözberg in the northeast, Linn to the south and Effingen to the northeast.

Linn had an area, as of 2009, of 2.55 square kilometers (0.98 sq mi). Of this area, 1.29 square kilometers (0.50 sq mi) or 50.6% is used for agricultural purposes, while 1.13 square kilometers (0.44 sq mi) or 44.3% is forested. Of the rest of the land, 0.12 km^{2} (30 acres) or 4.7% is settled (buildings or roads). The former municipality is located on a plateau of the Bözberg and south-west of the pass over the mountain. It consists of the linear village of Linn.

Oberbözberg had an area, as of 2009, of 5.45 square kilometers (2.10 sq mi). Of this area, 2.75 square kilometers (1.06 sq mi) or 50.5% is used for agricultural purposes, while 2.4 square kilometers (0.93 sq mi) or 44.0% is forested. Of the rest of the land, 0.26 square kilometers (0.10 sq mi) or 4.8% is settled (buildings or roads), 0.02 km^{2} (4.9 acres) or 0.4% is either rivers or lakes. The former municipality consists of the linear village of Oberbözberg and the hamlet of Ueberthal as well as scattered farms.

Unterbözberg had an area, as of 2009, of 6.12 square kilometers (2.36 sq mi). Of this area, 3.28 square kilometers (1.27 sq mi) or 53.6% is used for agricultural purposes, while 2.32 square kilometers (0.90 sq mi) or 37.9% is forested. Of the rest of the land, 0.59 square kilometers (0.23 sq mi) or 9.6% is settled (buildings or roads).

== Demographics ==
The total population of Bözberg (as of December 2020) is 1,663.

== Historic Population ==
The historical population is given in the following chart:

== Sights ==
The village of Linn, the hamlet of Ueberthal and the village church of Bözberg are designated as part of the Inventory of Swiss Heritage Sites.

== Weather ==
Unterbözberg has an average of 136.4 days of rain or snow per year and on average receives 1,099 mm (43.3 in) of precipitation. The wettest month is June during which time Unterbözberg receives an average of 116 mm (4.6 in) of rain or snow. During this month there is precipitation for an average of 11.9 days. The month with the most days of precipitation is May, with an average of 13.3, but with only 97 mm (3.8 in) of rain or snow. The driest month of the year is October with an average of 77 mm (3.0 in) of precipitation over 11.9 days.
