= Iberg Castle =

Iberg Castle may refer to:

- Iberg Castle, Aargau, Switzerland
- Iberg Castle, St. Gallen, Switzerland
