= Rüfenach =

- Municipality
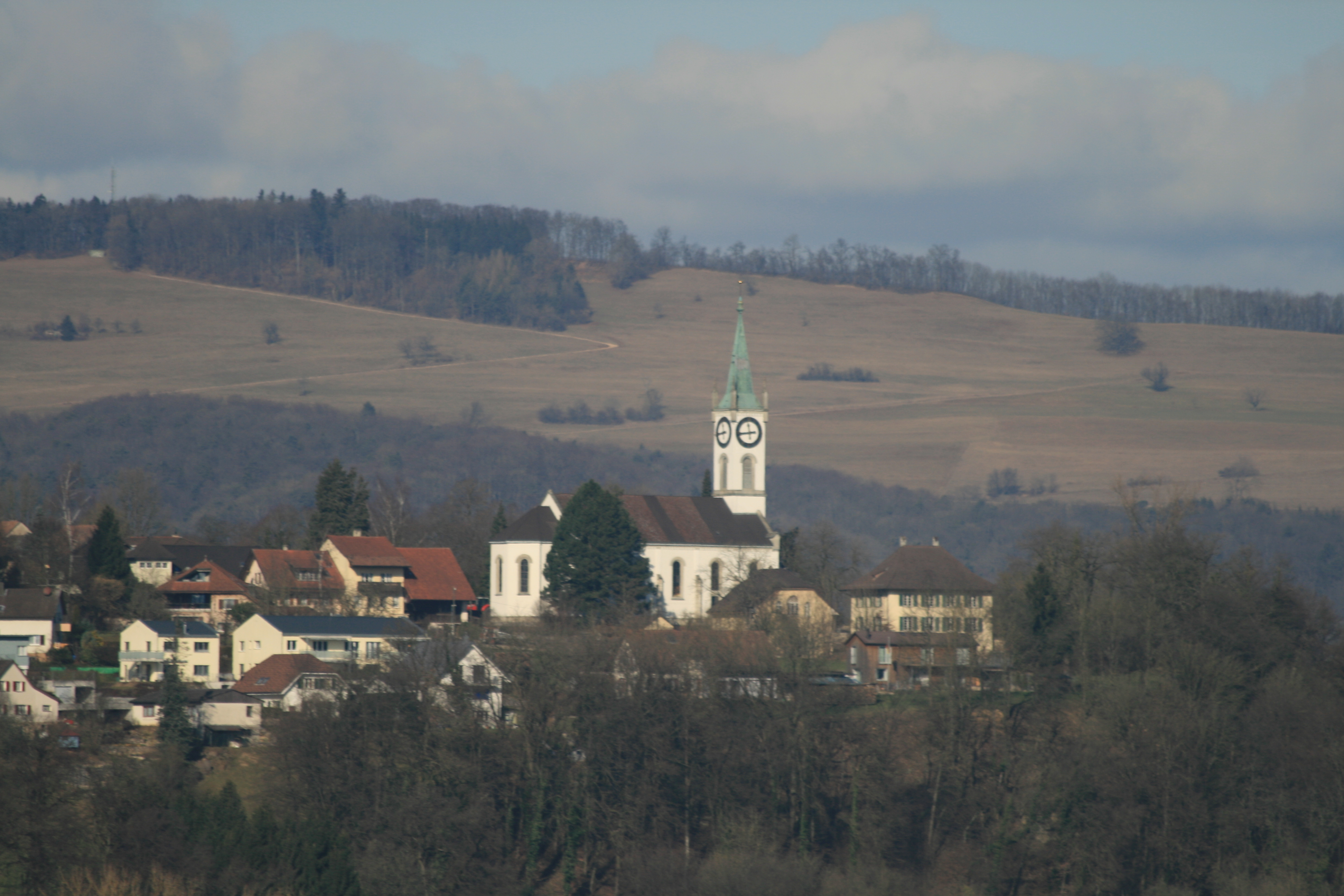

- Flag Coat of arms
- Location of Rüfenach
- Location within Switzerland Location within Canton of Aargau
- Coordinates: 47°31′N 8°13′E
- Country: Switzerland
- Canton: Aargau
- District: Brugg

Area
  - Total: 4.17 km^{2} (1.61 sq mi)
- Elevation: 374 m (1,227 ft)

Population (December 2020)
  - Total: 863
  - Density: 207/km^{2} (536/sq mi)
- Time zone: UTC+01:00 (CET)
  - Summer (DST): UTC+02:00 (CEST)
- Postal code: 5235
- SFOS number: 4112
- ISO 3166 code: CH-AG
- Localities: Rüfenach, Hinterrein, Vorderrein
- Surrounded by: Brugg, Remigen, Riniken, Villigen
- Website: ruefenach.ch

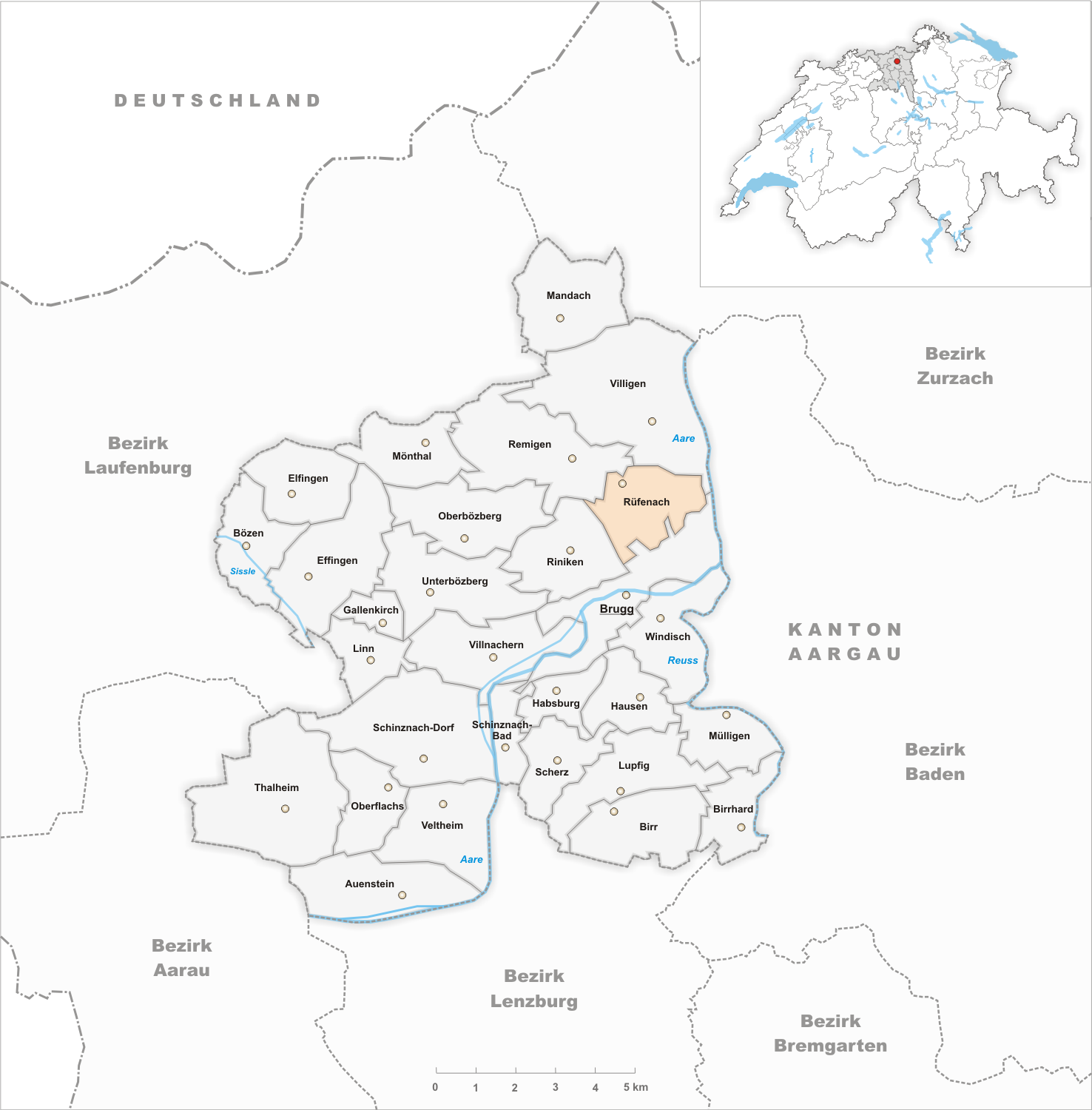
Rüfenach

Rüfenach is a municipality in the district of Brugg in the canton of Aargau in Switzerland.

== Geography ==
The municipality lies at the foot of the Bruggerberg and the Reinerberg, the southeast foothills of the Jura Mountains.

It consists of three villages, Rüfenach, Hinterrein, and Vorderrein. The latter two were part of an independent municipality called Rein until 1898.. Rüfenach lies furthest west in the middle of a flat plain. Hinterrein is slightly higher and lies in the middle. Vorderrein is to the east on a marked hill. The east side of this hill falls sharply to the Aare. The difference in altitude is about 70 m (230 ft).

Rüfenach has an area, as of 2009, of 4.17 square kilometers (1.61 sq mi). Of this area, 1.98 square kilometers (0.76 sq mi) or 47.5% is used for agricultural purposes, while 1.7 square kilometers (0.66 sq mi) or 40.8% is forested. Of the rest of the land, 0.48 square kilometers (0.19 sq mi) or 11.5% is settled (buildings or roads), 0.02 km^{2} (4.9 acres) or 0.5% is either rivers or lakes.

Of the built up area, housing and buildings made up 4.8% and transportation infrastructure made up 5.8%. 40.0% of the total land area is heavily forested. Of the agricultural land, 35.7% is used for growing crops and 8.2% is pastures, while 3.6% is used for orchards or vine crops. All the water in the municipality is in rivers and streams. The highest point, the Reinerberg, lies at 522 m (1,713 ft) in altitude, and the lowest in Vorderrein on the Aare at 325 m (1,066 ft).

Neighboring municipalities are Villigen to the north and northeast, Brugg to the southeast, Riniken to the southwest, and Remigen to the northwest.

== History ==
Since the 8th century, Rein was the center of a court, that belonged to the cloister of Murbach in Alsace. It also included Rüfenach, Lauffohr, Remigen, Stilli, and Villigen. Rüfenach is first mentioned around 1227-34 as Rufinach.

In the 13th century, the Habsburgs exerted their power in the region. King Rudolph I of Habsburg bought Rein in 1291. In 1345, Queen Agnes of Hungary gave Rein to the cloister of Wittichen im Kinzigtal in the Black Forest.

When the city of Bern conquered the area west of the Aare in 1460, the rights of the cloister were not affected. However, the arrival of the Reformation in 1528 did have a great effect. In 1544, the cloister sold Rein to Count Hartmann von Hallwyl. Between 1588 and 1599, the city of Brugg gained control of two thirds of the territory, and the city of Bern the other third.

In March 1798, conquered Switzerland and declared the Helvetic Republic. Rein became part of the new canton of Aargau. In 1799, the front line between the two coalitions in the Napoleonic Wars ran right down the center of the valley of the Aare. There were many French military camps in the region. The villagers suffered greatly from requisitions and plundering.

In 1803, Rein was dissolved, and the single villages were made independent municipalities. About a hundred years later, the canton actively promoted a policy of fusion, and Rein was combined with Rüfenach. The people of Rein resisted, but with no success. Although they took the case to the highest court, the two municipalities were united on 1 January 1898.

Until well into the 20th century, Rüfenach and Rein remained agricultural villages. In the 1960s, much construction was undertaken, and the population more than doubled.

== Coat of arms ==
The blazon of the municipal coat of arms is Azure a Garb Or.

== Architecture ==
The church that was once the central point of the municipality dates from the 9th century and has romanesque and gothic elements. It had to be razed in 1863 because it was no longer safe. In its place, a new church was built in 1864 designed by the Zürich architect, Johann Kaspar Wolf.

In 1814 the textile industrialist Johann Heinrich Meyer founded an orphanage and poorhouse. The building, which is in classical style, became part of the cantonal psychiatric hospital in 1947.

== Demographics ==
Rüfenach has a population (as of December 2020) of 863. As of June 2009, 10.2% of the population are foreign nationals. Over the last 10 years (1997–2007) the population has changed at a rate of 23.6%. Most of the population (as of 2000) speaks German (94.9%), with Portuguese being second most common ( 1.1%) and Albanian being third ( 1.1%).

The age distribution, as of 2008, in Rüfenach is; 81 children or 9.3% of the population are between 0 and 9 years old and 142 teenagers or 16.3% are between 10 and 19. Of the adult population, 95 people or 10.9% of the population are between 20 and 29 years old. 94 people or 10.8% are between 30 and 39, 171 people or 19.7% are between 40 and 49, and 128 people or 14.7% are between 50 and 59. The senior population distribution is 99 people or 11.4% of the population are between 60 and 69 years old, 39 people or 4.5% are between 70 and 79, there are 17 people or 2.0% who are between 80 and 89, and there are 3 people or 0.3% who are 90 and older.

As of 2000, there were 16 homes with 1 or 2 persons in the household, 113 homes with 3 or 4 persons in the household, and 122 homes with 5 or more persons in the household. The average number of people per household was 2.75 individuals. In 2008 there were 210 single family homes (or 62.1% of the total) out of a total of 338 homes and apartments. There were a total of 4 empty apartments for a 1.2% vacancy rate. As of 2007, the construction rate of new housing units was 10.7 new units per 1000 residents.

In the 2007 federal election the most popular party was the SVP which received 36.7% of the vote. The next three most popular parties were the SP (17.2%), the FDP (13.4%) and the CVP (12.4%).

In Rüfenach about 81.6% of the population (between age 25–64) have completed either non-mandatory upper secondary education or additional higher education (either university or a Fachhochschule). Of the school age population (in the 2008/2009 school year), there are 90 students attending primary school, there are 127 students attending secondary school in the municipality.

The historical population is given in the following table:

Historical population
Year	Pop.	±%
1764	124	—
1888	276	+122.6%
1900	266	−3.6%
1950	272	+2.3%
2000	727	+167.3%

== Economy ==
As of 2007, Rüfenach had an unemployment rate of 1.84%. As of 2005, there were 55 people employed in the primary economic sector and about 17 businesses involved in this sector. 3 people are employed in the secondary sector and there are 2 businesses in this sector. 105 people are employed in the tertiary sector, with 18 businesses in this sector.

As of 2000 there was a total of 386 workers who lived in the municipality. Of these, 292 or about 75.6% of the residents worked outside Rüfenach while 90 people commuted into the municipality for work. There were a total of 184 jobs (of at least 6 hours per week) in the municipality. Of the working population, 14.6% used public transportation to get to work, and 49.9% used a private car.

== Religion ==
From the 2000 census, 210 or 28.9% were Roman Catholic, while 397 or 54.6% belonged to the Swiss Reformed Church. Of the rest of the population, there were 3 individuals (or about 0.41% of the population) who belonged to the Christian Catholic faith.

== Transportation ==
The main highway from Stilli to Remigen and Laufenburg runs about 100 m north of the municipality. The post bus line from Brugg to Mönthal provides it with public transportation.

== Notable inhabitants ==
- Paul Haller, author (1882–1920)
