= Villnachern =

- Municipality
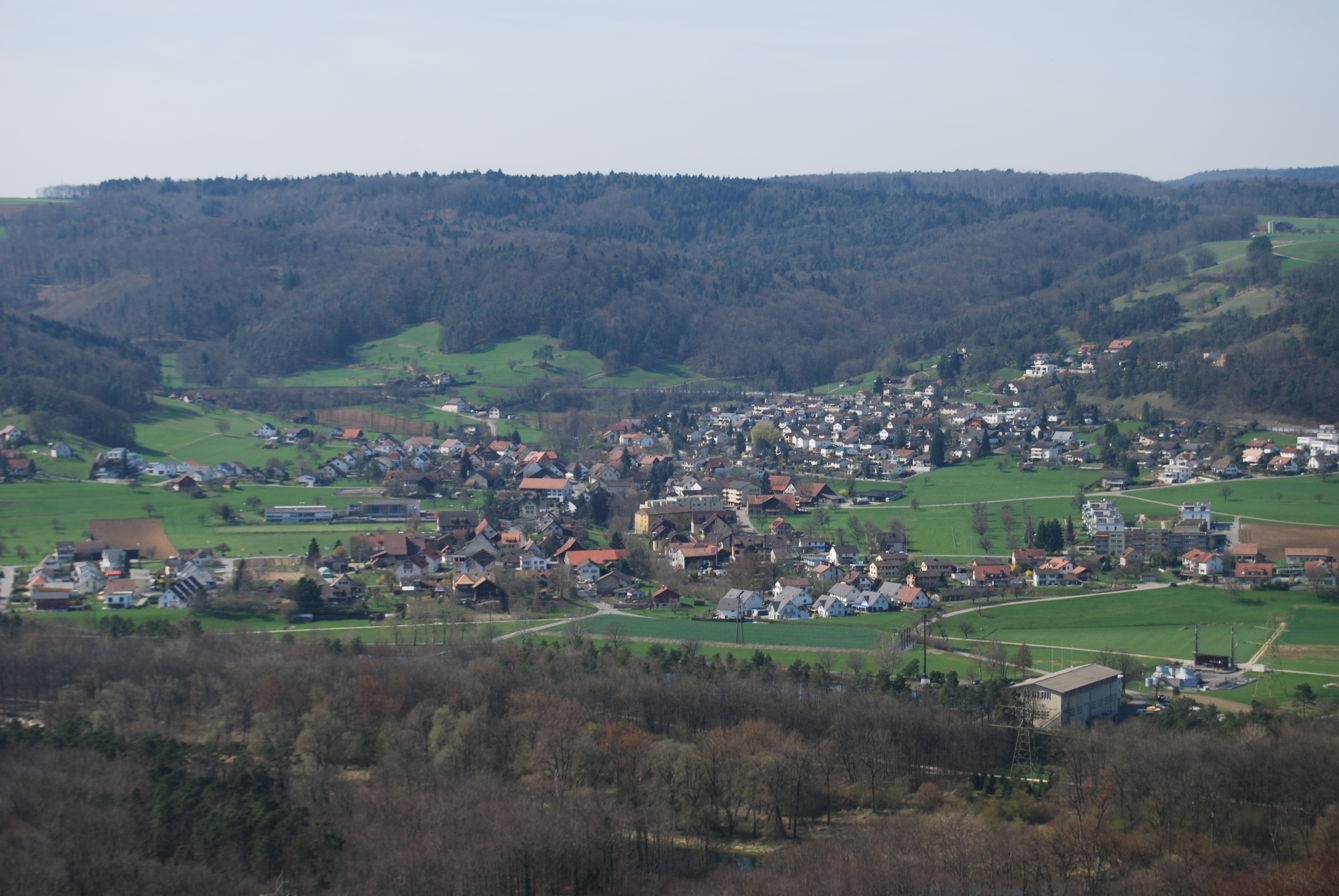

- Flag Coat of arms
- Location of Villnachern
- Location within Switzerland Location within Canton of Aargau
- Coordinates: 47°28′N 8°10′E
- Country: Switzerland
- Canton: Aargau
- District: Brugg

Area
  - Total: 5.74 km^{2} (2.22 sq mi)
- Elevation: 362 m (1,188 ft)

Population (December 2020)
  - Total: 1,654
  - Density: 288/km^{2} (746/sq mi)
- Time zone: UTC+01:00 (CET)
  - Summer (DST): UTC+02:00 (CEST)
- Postal code: 5213
- SFOS number: 4122
- ISO 3166 code: CH-AG
- Surrounded by: Brugg, Linn, Schinznach-Bad, Schinznach-Dorf, Umiken, Unterbözberg
- Website: www.villnachern.ch

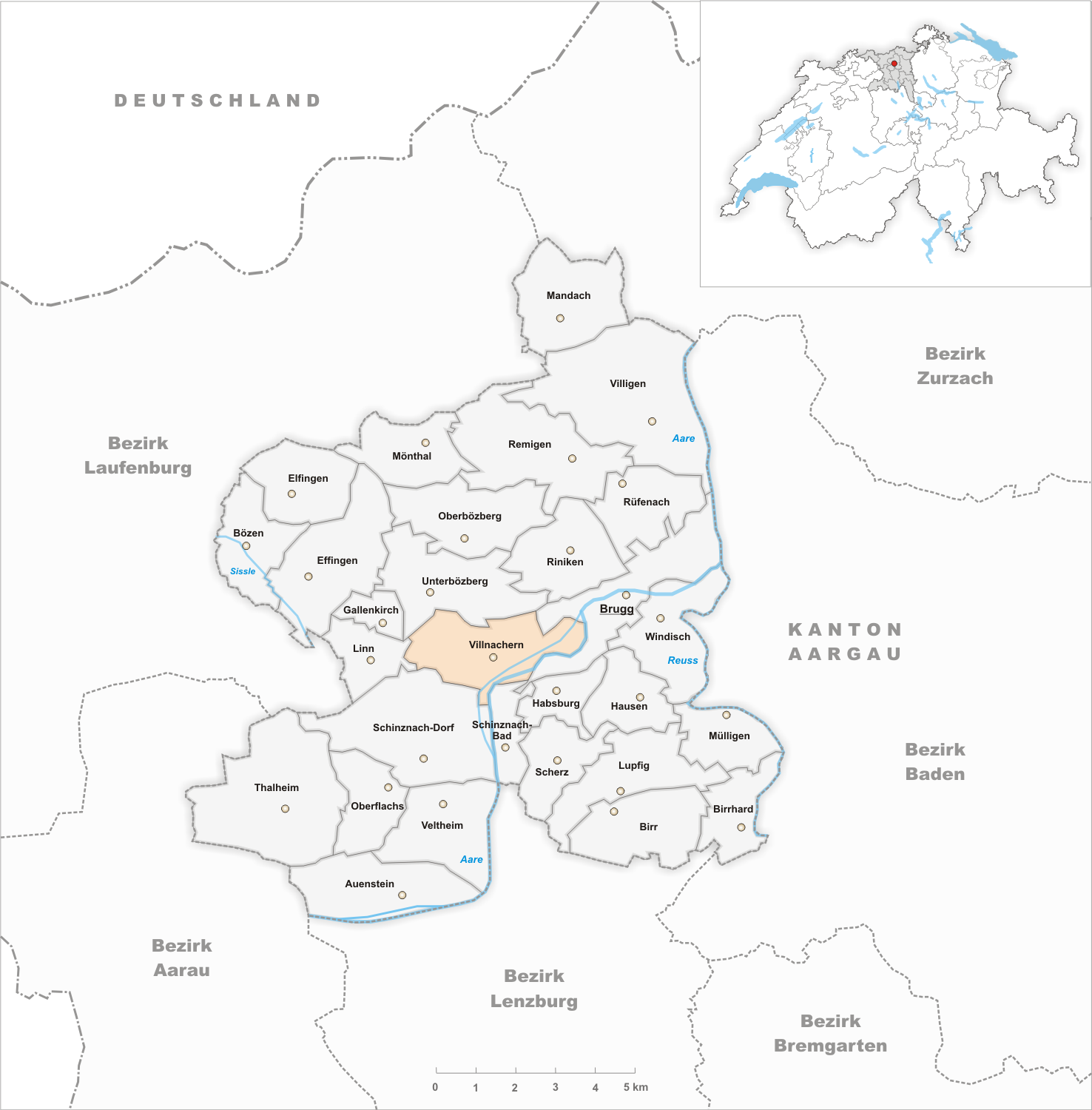
Villnachern

Villnachern is a former municipality in the district of Brugg in the canton of Aargau in Switzerland that was merged into Brugg.

== Geography ==
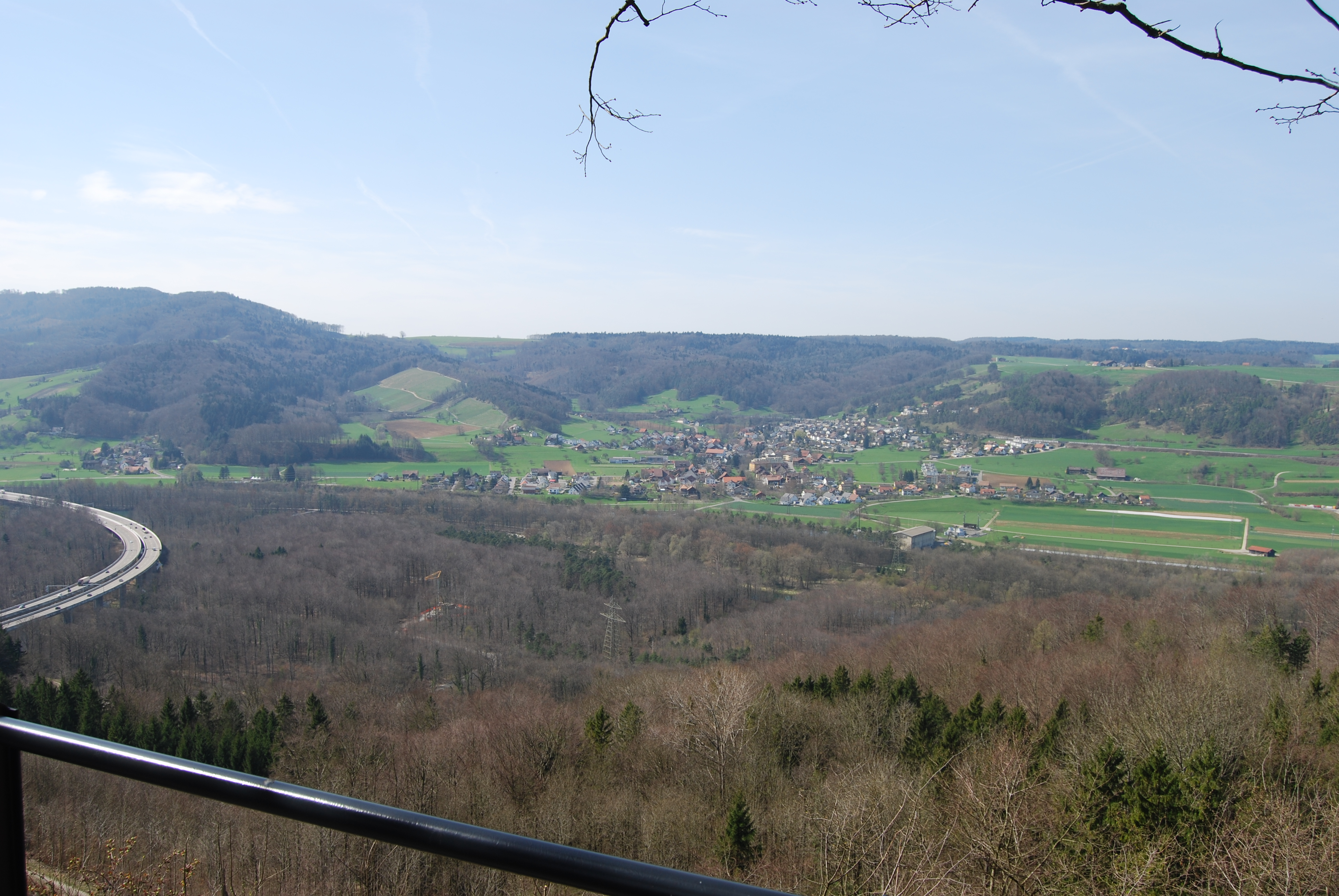
Villnachern village and the A3 motorway from Habsburg castle.

Aerial view (1964)

Villnachern has an area, as of 2009, of 5.74 square kilometers (2.22 sq mi). Of this area, 1.67 square kilometers (0.64 sq mi) or 29.1% is used for agricultural purposes, while 2.85 square kilometers (1.10 sq mi) or 49.7% is forested. Of the rest of the land, 0.72 square kilometers (0.28 sq mi) or 12.5% is settled (buildings or roads), 0.4 square kilometers (0.15 sq mi) or 7.0% is either rivers or lakes and 0.04 km^{2} (9.9 acres) or 0.7% is unproductive land.

Of the built up area, housing and buildings made up 7.8% and transportation infrastructure made up 4.2%. 46.9% of the total land area is heavily forested and 2.8% is covered with orchards or small clusters of trees. Of the agricultural land, 17.1% is used for growing crops and 9.2% is pastures, while 2.8% is used for orchards or vine crops. All the water in the municipality is in rivers and streams.

== Coat of arms ==
The blazon of the municipal coat of arms is Azure a Ploughshare Or between in Chief two Mullets of Five of the same.

== Demographics ==
Villnachern has a population (as of December 2020) of 1,654 As of June 2009, 10.8% of the population are foreign nationals. Over the last 10 years (1997–2007) the population has changed at a rate of 18.1%. Most of the population (as of 2000) speaks German (92.0%), with French being second most common ( 1.1%) and Italian being third ( 1.1%).

The age distribution, as of 2008, in Villnachern is; 184 children or 12.4% of the population are between 0 and 9 years old and 166 teenagers or 11.2% are between 10 and 19. Of the adult population, 151 people or 10.2% of the population are between 20 and 29 years old. 195 people or 13.1% are between 30 and 39, 234 people or 15.7% are between 40 and 49, and 218 people or 14.7% are between 50 and 59. The senior population distribution is 195 people or 13.1% of the population are between 60 and 69 years old, 91 people or 6.1% are between 70 and 79, there are 44 people or 3.0% who are between 80 and 89, and there are 8 people or 0.5% who are 90 and older.

As of 2000, there were 45 homes with 1 or 2 persons in the household, 212 homes with 3 or 4 persons in the household, and 227 homes with 5 or more persons in the household. The average number of people per household was 2.40 individuals. As of 2000, there were 497 private households (homes and apartments) in the municipality, and an average of 2.4 persons per household. In 2008 there were 333 single family homes (or 50.4% of the total) out of a total of 661 homes and apartments. Over the 8 years between the two surveys, the number of private households in the municipality increased by 164. There were a total of 10 empty apartments for a 1.5% vacancy rate. As of 2007, the construction rate of new housing units was 5.5 new units per 1000 residents.

In the 2007 federal election the most popular party was the SVP which received 37.8% of the vote. The next three most popular parties were the SP (18.5%), the FDP (11.6%) and the CVP (10.2%).

In Villnachern about 82.2% of the population (between age 25-64) have completed either non-mandatory upper secondary education or additional higher education (either university or a Fachhochschule). Of the school age population (in the 2008/2009 school year), there are 121 students attending primary school in the municipality.

The historical population is given in the following table:

Historical population
Year	Pop.	±%
1975	989	—
1980	1,062	+7.4%
1990	1,317	+24.0%
2000	1,224	−7.1%

== Heritage sites of national significance ==
The Tithe barn (German: Zehntenhaus) at Vorstadt 2 is listed as a Swiss heritage site of national significance.

== Economy ==
As of 2007, Villnachern had an unemployment rate of 1.83%. As of 2005, there were 54 people employed in the primary economic sector and about 13 businesses involved in this sector. 72 people are employed in the secondary sector and there are 16 businesses in this sector. 80 people are employed in the tertiary sector, with 30 businesses in this sector.

As of 2000 there was a total of 635 workers who lived in the municipality. Of these, 530 or about 83.5% of the residents worked outside Villnachern while 72 people commuted into the municipality for work. There were a total of 177 jobs (of at least 6 hours per week) in the municipality. Of the working population, 15.9% used public transportation to get to work, and 56.7% used a private car.

== Religion ==
From the 2000 census, 304 or 24.9% were Roman Catholic, while 684 or 56.0% belonged to the Swiss Reformed Church. Of the rest of the population, there were 4 individuals (or about 0.33% of the population) who belonged to the Christian Catholic faith.
