= Unterbözberg =

- Former municipality
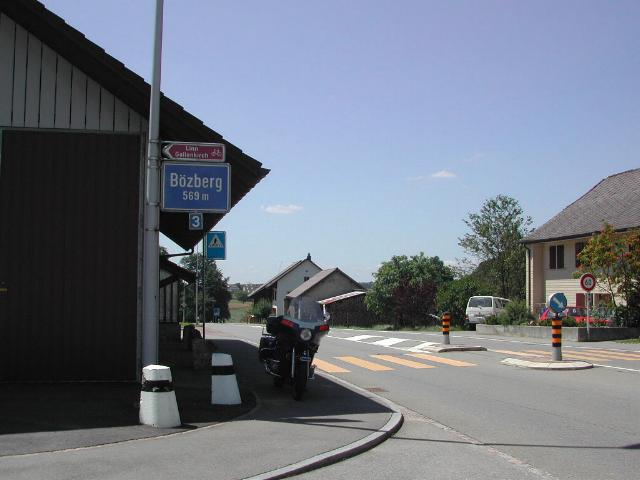

- Flag Coat of arms
- Location of Unterbözberg
- Location within Switzerland Location within Canton of Aargau
- Coordinates: 47°29′N 8°9′E
- Country: Switzerland
- Canton: Aargau
- District: Brugg

Area
  - Total: 6.12 km^{2} (2.36 sq mi)
- Elevation: 507 m (1,663 ft)

Population (Dec 2011)
  - Total: 735
  - Density: 120/km^{2} (311/sq mi)
- Time zone: UTC+01:00 (CET)
  - Summer (DST): UTC+02:00 (CEST)
- Postal code: 5224
- SFOS number: 4119
- ISO 3166 code: CH-AG
- Surrounded by: Effingen, Gallenkirch, Linn, Oberbözberg, Riniken, Umiken, Villnachern
- Website: www.unterboezberg.ch

Unterbözberg is a former municipality in the district of Brugg in the canton of Aargau in Switzerland. On 1 January 2013 the former municipalities of Gallenkirch, Linn, Oberbözberg and Unterbözberg merged to form the new municipality of Bözberg.

== History ==
Unterbözberg is first mentioned in 1189 as Bozeberch. Until 1873, the municipality was part of Bözberg, which split into Oberbözberg and Unterbözberg.

== Geography ==
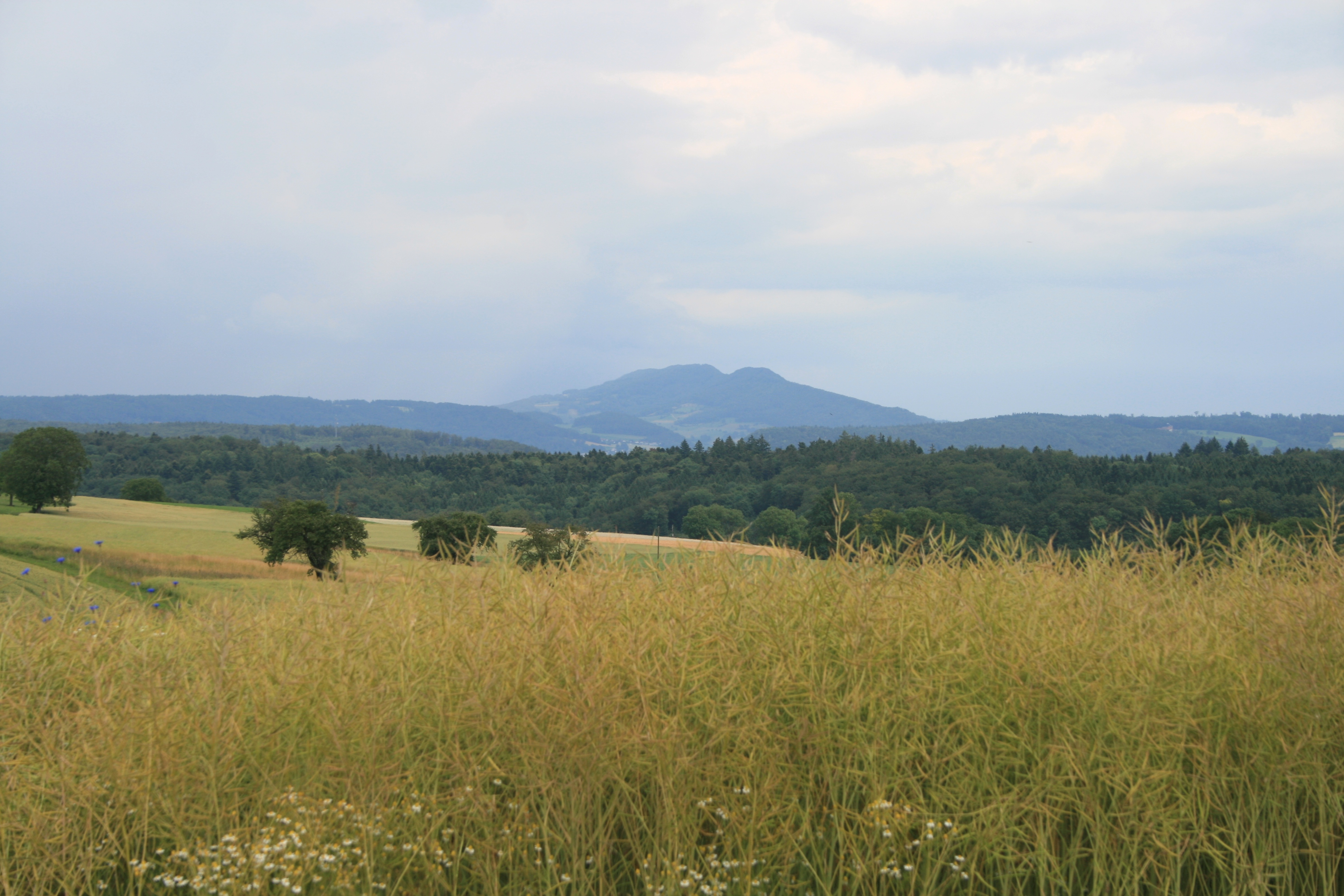
View from the Bözberg toward Lägern.

Unterbözberg had an area, as of 2009, of 6.12 square kilometers (2.36 sq mi). Of this area, 3.28 square kilometers (1.27 sq mi) or 53.6% is used for agricultural purposes, while 2.32 square kilometers (0.90 sq mi) or 37.9% is forested. Of the rest of the land, 0.59 square kilometers (0.23 sq mi) or 9.6% is settled (buildings or roads).

Of the built-up area, housing and buildings made up 4.6% and transportation infrastructure made up 4.4%. 36.6% of the total land area is heavily forested and 1.3% is covered with orchards or small clusters of trees. Of the agricultural land, 38.2% is used for growing crops and 13.7% is pastures, while 1.6% is used for orchards or vine crops.

== Coat of arms ==
The blazon of the municipal coat of arms is Vert a Bendlet Argent between four Linden tree Leaves Or bendwise.

== Demographics ==
Unterbözberg had a population (as of 2011) of 735. As of June 2009, 7.7% of the population are foreign nationals. Over the last 10 years (1997–2007) the population has changed at a rate of -4.5%. Most of the population (as of 2000) speaks German (94.4%), with Albanian being the second most common language( 1.5%) and Italian being third ( 1.3%).

The age distribution, as of 2008, in Unterbözberg is; 63 children or 8.7% of the population are between 0 and 9 years old and 56 teenagers or 7.7% are between 10 and 19. Of the adult population, 90 people or 12.4% of the population are between 20 and 29 years old. 89 people or 12.3% are between 30 and 39, 105 people or 14.5% are between 40 and 49, and 124 people or 17.1% are between 50 and 59. The senior population distribution is 105 people or 14.5% of the population are between 60 and 69 years old, 57 people or 7.9% are between 70 and 79, there are 34 people or 4.7% who are between 80 and 89, and 2 people or 0.3% who are 90 or older.

As of 2000, there were 32 homes with 1 or 2 persons in the household, 100 homes with 3 or 4 persons in the household, and 164 homes with 5 or more persons in the household. The average number of people per household was 2.47 individuals. As of 2000, there were 299 private households (homes and apartments) in the municipality, and an average of 2.5 persons per household. In 2008 there were 164 single family homes (or 49.2% of the total) out of a total of 333 homes and apartments. As of 2007, the construction rate of new housing units was 22.6 new units per 1000 residents.

In the 2007 federal election the most popular party was the SVP which received 44.8% of the vote. The next three most popular parties were the FDP (12.9%), the SP (12.5%) and the Green Party (9.5%).

In Unterbözberg about 82.2% of the population (between age 25-64) have completed either non-mandatory upper secondary education or additional higher education (either university or a Fachhochschule). Of the school age population (in the 2008/2009 school year), there are 31 students attending primary school in the municipality.

The historical population is given in the following table: The historical population is given in the following table:

Historical population
Year	Pop.	±%
1975	625	—
1980	608	−2.7%
1990	674	+10.9%
2000	754	+11.9%

== Sights ==
The village church of Bözberg is designated as part of the Inventory of Swiss Heritage Sites.

== Economy ==
As of 2007, Unterbözberg had an unemployment rate of 1%. As of 2005, there were 48 people employed in the primary economic sector and about 19 businesses involved in this sector. 11 people are employed in the secondary sector and there are 4 businesses in this sector. 58 people are employed in the tertiary sector, with 21 businesses in this sector.

As of 2000 there was a total of 376 workers who lived in the municipality. Of these, 306 or about 81.4% of the residents worked outside Unterbözberg while 45 people commuted into the municipality for work. There were a total of 115 jobs (of at least 6 hours per week) in the municipality. Of the working population, 20.7% used public transportation to get to work, and 52.7% used a private car.

== Religion ==
From the 2000 census, 213 or 28.4% were Roman Catholic, while 417 or 55.7% belonged to the Swiss Reformed Church. Of the rest of the population, there were 4 individuals (or about 0.53% of the population) who belonged to the Christian Catholic faith.

== Weather ==
Unterbözberg has an average of 136.4 days of rain or snow per year and on average receives 1,099 mm (43.3 in) of precipitation. The wettest month is June during which time Unterbözberg receives an average of 116 mm (4.6 in) of rain or snow. During this month there is precipitation for an average of 11.9 days. The month with the most days of precipitation is May, with an average of 13.3, but with only 97 mm (3.8 in) of rain or snow. The driest month of the year is October with an average of 77 mm (3.0 in) of precipitation over 11.9 days.
