= Gallenkirch =

- Former municipality
- Flag Coat of arms
- Location of Gallenkirch
- Location within Switzerland Location within Canton of Aargau
- Coordinates: 47°29′N 8°8′E
- Country: Switzerland
- Canton: Aargau
- District: Brugg

Area
  - Total: 1.4 km^{2} (0.54 sq mi)
- Elevation: 565 m (1,854 ft)

Population (Dec 2011)
  - Total: 133
  - Density: 95/km^{2} (250/sq mi)
- Time zone: UTC+01:00 (CET)
  - Summer (DST): UTC+02:00 (CEST)
- Postal code: 5224
- SFOS number: 4098
- ISO 3166 code: CH-AG
- Surrounded by: Effingen, Linn, Unterbözberg
- Website: gallenkirch.ch

Gallenkirch is a former municipality in the district of Brugg in canton of Aargau in Switzerland. On 1 January 2013 the former municipalities of Gallenkirch, Linn, Oberbözberg and Unterbözberg merged to form the new municipality of Bözberg.

== History ==
Gallenkirch is first mentioned in 1338 as Gallenkilch. During the Middle Ages, Gallenkirch was part of the district of Hornussen under the city of Bad Säckingen. Religiously, until the Reformation the residents were also part of the parish of Hornussen. The local chapel was dedicated to Saint Gall, but is no longer standing. Portions of the structure were incorporated into a later building. After the Reformation the village became part of the reformed parish of Bözberg. Under Bernese rule (1460-1798) the village was part of the Thalheim court. In the 19th and 20th century, several attempts to merge Gallenkirch into the village of Linn failed. However, since 1917, children attend the local school in Linn, and other infrastructure problems are solved through inter-municipal cooperation. In Gallenkirch there is no shopping or other economy. Today's inhabitants are farmers or commuters to the nearby industrial centers.

== Geography ==
Gallenkirch had an area, as of 2009, of 1.4 square kilometers (0.54 sq mi). Of this area, 1.04 square kilometers (0.40 sq mi) or 74.3% is used for agricultural purposes, while 0.26 square kilometers (0.10 sq mi) or 18.6% is forested. Of the rest of the land, 0.1 km^{2} (25 acres) or 7.1% is settled (buildings or roads).

Of the built up area, housing and buildings made up 3.6% and transportation infrastructure made up 3.6%. 17.9% of the total land area is heavily forested. Of the agricultural land, 52.9% is used for growing crops and 17.9% is pastures, while 3.6% is used for orchards or vine crops.

The former municipality is located in the Brugg district, west of the mountain pass through which the modern Bözbergstrasse runs. Gallenkirch is 5 kilometers (3.1 mi) from downtown Brugg, the district seat. The municipality is bounded with Unterbözberg in the northeast, Linn to the south and Effingen to the northeast.

== Coat of arms ==
The blazon of the municipal coat of arms is Per pale Or a Trunk couped ragully proper and Azure a Latin Cross patte couped Or. The trunk of wood is from Saint Gall, who according to legend carried a wooden staff, while the cross is for the Gallus Chapel, from which the village derives its name.

== Demographics ==
Gallenkirch had a population (as of 2011) of 133. As of June 2009, 6.5% of the population are foreign nationals. Over the last 10 years (1997–2007) the population has changed at a rate of 31.1%. Most of the population (as of 2000) speaks German (95.9%), with Portuguese being second most common ( 1.7%) and Polish being third ( 1.7%).

The age distribution, as of 2008, in Gallenkirch is; 10 children or 7.0% of the population are between 0 and 9 years old and 20 teenagers or 14.1% are between 10 and 19. Of the adult population, 21 people or 14.8% of the population are between 20 and 29 years old. 25 people or 17.6% are between 30 and 39, 21 people or 14.8% are between 40 and 49, and 20 people or 14.1% are between 50 and 59. The senior population distribution is 17 people or 12.0% of the population are between 60 and 69 years old, 6 people or 4.2% are between 70 and 79, there are 2 people or 1.4% who are between 80 and 89.

As of 2000 the average number of residents per living room was 0.53 which is about equal to the cantonal average of 0.57 per room. In this case, a room is defined as space of a housing unit of at least 4 m^{2} (43 sq ft) as normal bedrooms, dining rooms, living rooms, kitchens and habitable cellars and attics.

About 64% of the total households were owner occupied, or in other words did not pay rent (though they may have a mortgage or a rent-to-own agreement). As of 2000, there were 5 homes with 1 or 2 persons in the household, 21 homes with 3 or 4 persons in the household, and 24 homes with 5 or more persons in the household. The average number of people per household was 2.42 individuals. In 2008 there were 21 single family homes (or 35.6% of the total) out of a total of 59 homes and apartments. There were a total of 0 empty apartments for a 0.0% vacancy rate. As of 2007, the construction rate of new housing units was 14.8 new units per 1000 residents.

In the 2007 federal election the most popular party was the SVP which received 41.7% of the vote. The next three most popular parties were the SP (18.5%), the Green Party (12.1%) and the Other (10.1%).

The historical population is given in the following table:

Historical population
Year	Pop.	±%
1764	66	—
1850	109	+65.2%
1900	92	−15.6%
1950	79	−14.1%
1970	65	−17.7%
2000	121	+86.2%

== Education ==
In Gallenkirch about 81.4% of the population (between age 25–64) have completed either non-mandatory upper secondary education or additional higher education (either university or a Fachhochschule). There are no schools in Gallenkirch, the nearest school is the primary school in Unterbözberg.

== Economy ==
As of 2007, Gallenkirch had an unemployment rate of 0%. As of 2005, there were 11 people employed in the primary economic sector and about 4 businesses involved in this sector. 2 people are employed in the secondary sector and there is 1 business in this sector. 26 people are employed in the tertiary sector, with 4 businesses in this sector.

As of 2000 there was a total of 66 workers who lived in the municipality. Of these, 50 or about 75.8% of the residents worked outside Gallenkirch while 27 people commuted into the municipality for work. There were a total of 43 jobs (of at least 6 hours per week) in the municipality. Of the working population, 10.1% used public transportation to get to work, and 56.5% used a private car.

== Religion ==
From the 2000 census, 33 or 27.3% were Roman Catholic, while 67 or 55.4% belonged to the Swiss Reformed Church.
