= Linn, Aargau =

Linn
- Former municipality
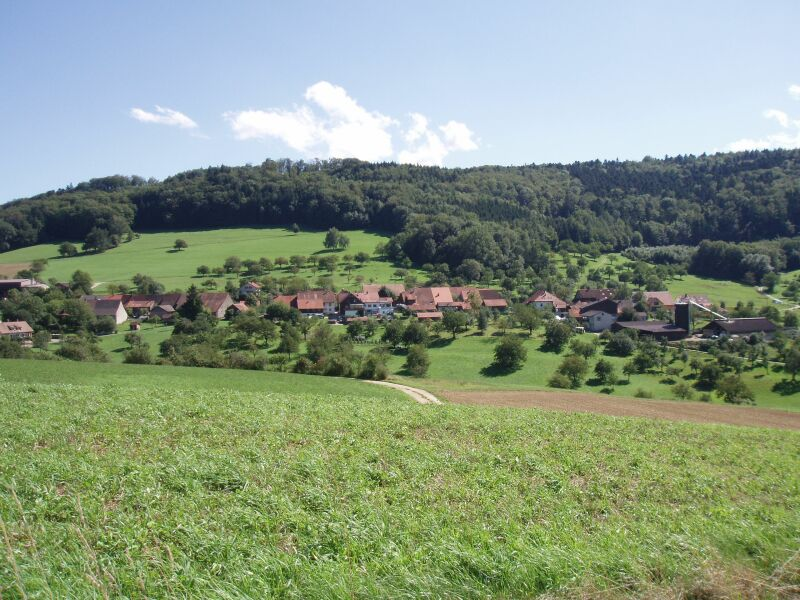
- Linn village

- Flag Coat of arms
- Location of Linn
- Location within Switzerland Location within Canton of Aargau
- Coordinates: 47°28′N 8°8′E
- Country: Switzerland
- Canton: Aargau
- District: Brugg

Area
  - Total: 2.55 km^{2} (0.98 sq mi)
- Elevation: 570 m (1,870 ft)

Population (Dec 2011)
  - Total: 136
  - Density: 53.3/km^{2} (138/sq mi)
- Time zone: UTC+01:00 (CET)
  - Summer (DST): UTC+02:00 (CEST)
- Postal code: 5225
- SFOS number: 4103
- ISO 3166 code: CH-AG
- Surrounded by: Effingen, Gallenkirch, Schinznach-Dorf, Unterbözberg, Villnachern, Zeihen
- Website: SFSO statistics

Linn is a former municipality in the district of Brugg in canton of Aargau in Switzerland. On 1 January 2013 the former municipalities of Gallenkirch, Linn, Oberbözberg and Unterbözberg merged to form the new municipality of Bözberg.

== History ==
Linn is first mentioned around 1303-08 as ze Linne. In 1307 it was mentioned as ze Lind. The name is probably connected with the 500- to 800-year-old, legendary Linden tree which is east of Linn. In the Middle Ages it probably belonged to the vogtei of Elfingen. In 1460 it was incorporated as part of the court of Bözberg in the Canton of Bern.

Initially, its inhabitants were part of the Elfingen-Bözen parish, and after 1649 the Bözberg parish. Before the Reformation in 1528, it possessed a chapel.

Agriculture was the major economic activity up into the middle of the 19th century. Due to declining opportunities in the mid-19th century, many of the farming families migrated away. By the end of the 20th century there were seven farms, while most other workers in the region were working in Brugg. Since the 1990s, Linn has been accessible by Postauto.

== Geography ==
Linn had an area, as of 2009, of 2.55 square kilometers (0.98 sq mi). Of this area, 1.29 square kilometers (0.50 sq mi) or 50.6% is used for agricultural purposes, while 1.13 square kilometers (0.44 sq mi) or 44.3% is forested. Of the rest of the land, 0.12 km^{2} (30 acres) or 4.7% is settled (buildings or roads). Of the built up area, housing and buildings made up 3.1% and transportation infrastructure made up 1.6%. 42.4% of the total land area is heavily forested and 2.0% is covered with orchards or small clusters of trees. Of the agricultural land, 23.1% is used for growing crops and 25.5% is pastures, while 2.0% is used for orchards or vine crops.

The former municipality is located in the Brugg district, on a plateau of the Bözberg and south-west of the pass over the mountain. It consists of the linear village of Linn.

== Coat of arms ==
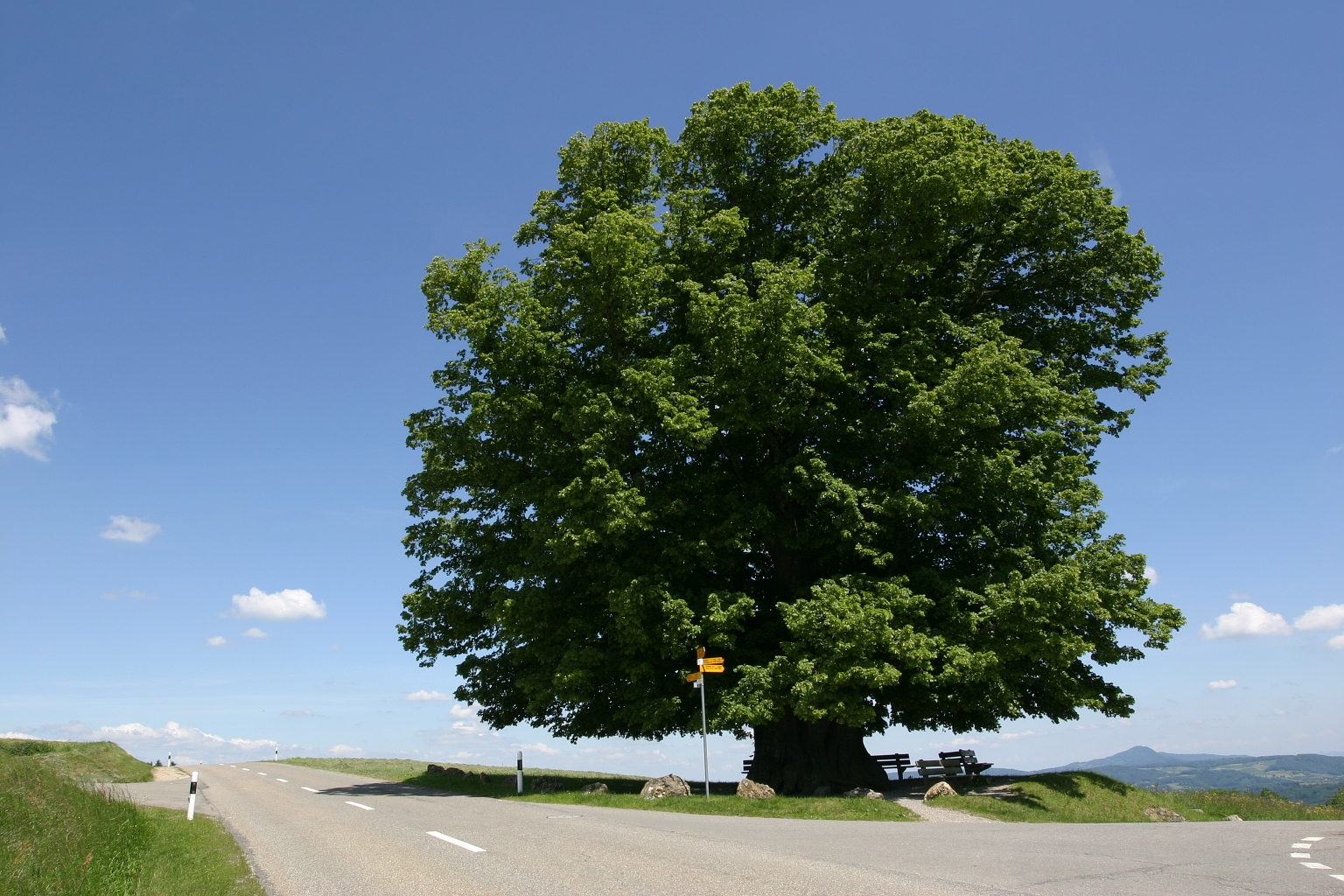
Linden tree outside of Linn

The blazon of the municipal coat of arms is Argent on a Mount Vert a Linden Tree of the same trunked and eradicated proper. The name Linn comes from legendary 500- to 800-year-old Linden tree that is east of the town. As the coat of arms shows this tree, it is an example of canting arms.

== Demographics ==
Linn had a population (as of 2013) of 136. As of June 2009, 8.8% of the population are foreign nationals. Over the last 10 years (1997–2007) the population has changed at a rate of 29.1%. Most of the population (as of 2000) speaks German (96.4%), with French being second most common (2.7%) and Dutch being third (0.9%).

The age distribution, as of 2008, in Linn is; 14 children or 10.1% of the population are between 0 and 9 years old and 17 teenagers or 12.3% are between 10 and 19. Of the adult population, 10 people or 7.2% of the population are between 20 and 29 years old. 15 people or 10.9% are between 30 and 39, 37 people or 26.8% are between 40 and 49, and 23 people or 16.7% are between 50 and 59. The senior population distribution is 13 people or 9.4% of the population are between 60 and 69 years old, 5 people or 3.6% are between 70 and 79, there are 4 people or 2.9% who are between 80 and 89.

As of 2000 the average number of residents per living room was 0.56 which is about equal to the cantonal average of 0.57 per room. In this case, a room is defined as space of a housing unit of at least 4 m^{2} (43 sq ft) as normal bedrooms, dining rooms, living rooms, kitchens and habitable cellars and attics. About 72.5% of the total households were owner occupied, or in other words did not pay rent (though they may have a mortgage or a rent-to-own agreement).

As of 2000, there were 2 homes with 1 or 2 persons in the household, 16 homes with 3 or 4 persons in the household, and 22 homes with 5 or more persons in the household. The average number of people per household was 2.73 individuals. In 2008 there were 26 single family homes (or 46.4% of the total) out of a total of 56 homes and apartments. As of 2007, the construction rate of new housing units was 0 new units per 1000 residents.

In the 2007 federal election the most popular party was the SVP which received 54.3% of the vote. The next three most popular parties were the FDP (12.7%), the SP (7.6%) and the CVP (6.6%).

In Linn about 88.3% of the population (between age 25–64) have completed either non-mandatory upper secondary education or additional higher education (either university or a Fachhochschule). Of the school age population (in the 2008/2009 school year), there are 13 students attending primary school in the municipality.

The historical population is given in the following table:

Historical population
Year	Pop.	±%
1764	137	—
1850	171	+24.8%
1900	130	−24.0%
1950	113	−13.1%
2000	112	−0.9%

== Sights ==
The village of Linn is designated as part of the Inventory of Swiss Heritage Sites.

== Economy ==
As of 2007, Linn had an unemployment rate of 1.62%. As of 2005, there were 23 people employed in the primary economic sector and about 11 businesses involved in this sector. 4 people are employed in the secondary sector and there are 2 businesses in this sector. 13 people are employed in the tertiary sector, with 5 businesses in this sector.

As of 2000 there was a total of 68 workers who lived in the municipality. Of these, 46 or about 67.6% of the residents worked outside Linn while 6 people commuted into the municipality for work. There were a total of 28 jobs (of at least 6 hours per week) in the municipality. Of the working population, 8.5% used public transportation to get to work, and 53.5% used a private car.

== Religion ==
From the 2000 census, 24 or 21.4% were Roman Catholic, while 78 or 69.6% belonged to the Swiss Reformed Church.
