= Umiken =

- Former municipality
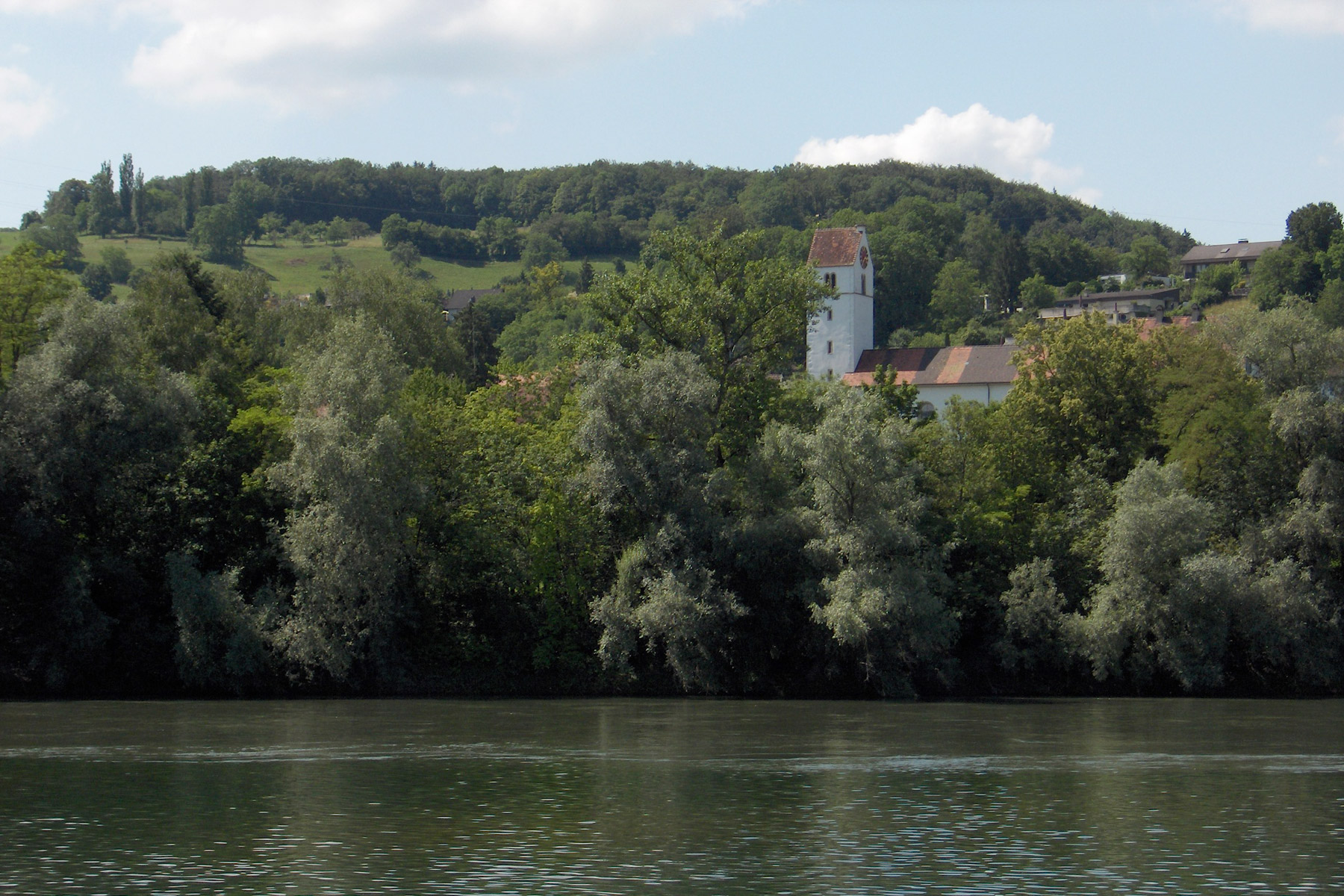

- Flag Coat of arms
- Location of Umiken
- Location within Switzerland Location within Canton of Aargau
- Coordinates: 47°29′N 8°12′E
- Country: Switzerland
- Canton: Aargau
- District: Brugg

Area
  - Total: 0.80 km^{2} (0.31 sq mi)
- Elevation: 355 m (1,165 ft)

Population (December 2006)
  - Total: 1,066
  - Density: 1,300/km^{2} (3,500/sq mi)
- Time zone: UTC+01:00 (CET)
  - Summer (DST): UTC+02:00 (CEST)
- Postal code: 5222
- SFOS number: 4118
- ISO 3166 code: CH-AG
- Surrounded by: Brugg, Riniken, Unterbözberg, Villnachern
- Website: www.umiken.ch

Umiken was a municipality in the district of Brugg in the canton of Aargau in Switzerland. On 1 January 2010 the municipality of Umiken merged into Brugg.

Aerial view (1958)

== Economy ==
In 2000 there was a total of 525 workers who lived in the municipality. Of these, 472 or about 89.9% of the residents worked outside Umiken while 45 people commuted into the municipality for work. There were a total of 98 jobs (of at least 6 hours per week) in the municipality.
