= Oberbözberg =

- Former municipality
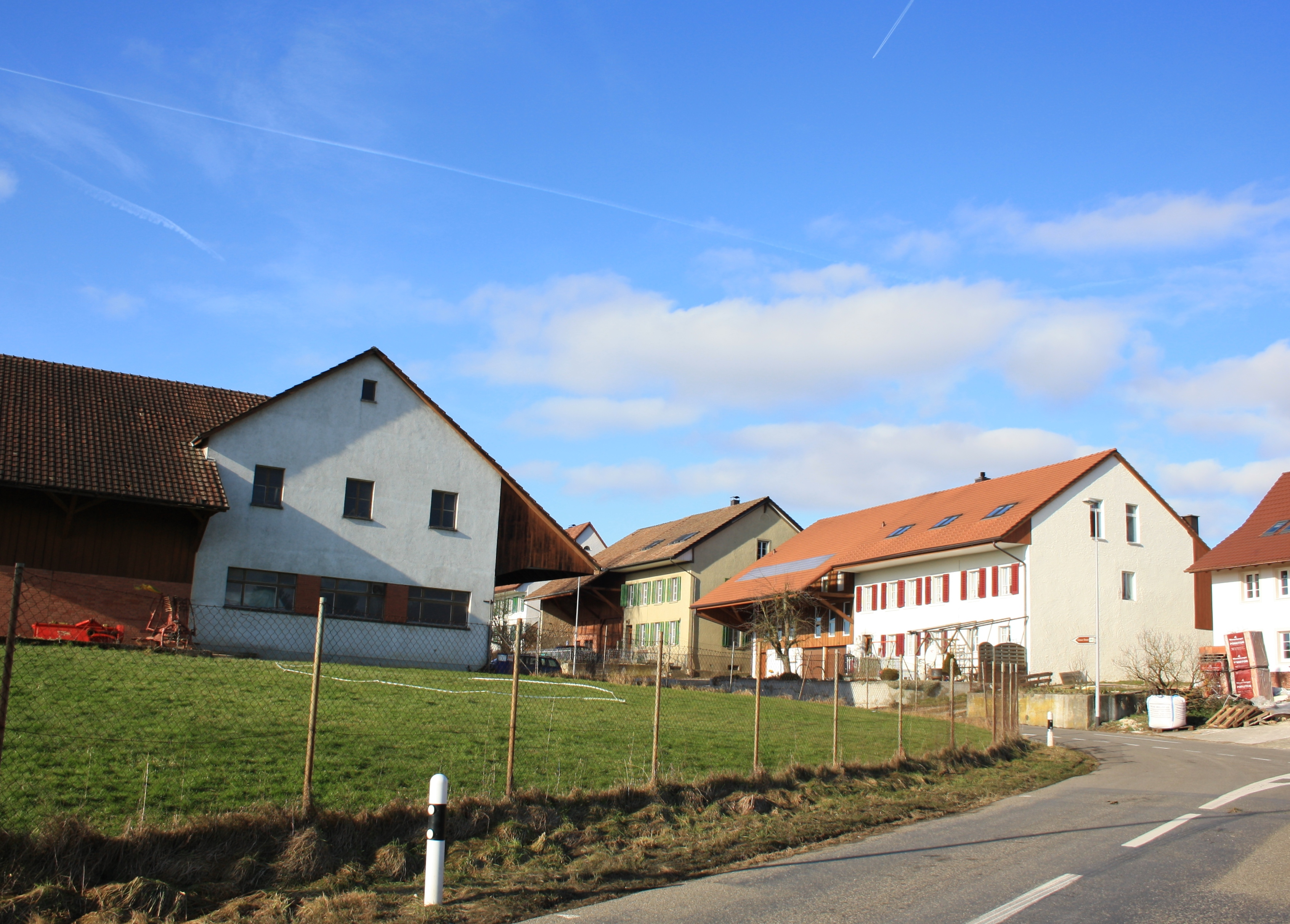

- Flag Coat of arms
- Location of Oberbözberg
- Location within Switzerland Location within Canton of Aargau
- Coordinates: 47°30′N 8°9′E
- Country: Switzerland
- Canton: Aargau
- District: Brugg

Area
  - Total: 5.45 km^{2} (2.10 sq mi)
- Elevation: 540 m (1,770 ft)

Population (Dec 2011)
  - Total: 499
  - Density: 91.6/km^{2} (237/sq mi)
- Time zone: UTC+01:00 (CET)
  - Summer (DST): UTC+02:00 (CEST)
- Postal code: 5225
- SFOS number: 4108
- ISO 3166 code: CH-AG
- Surrounded by: Effingen, Mönthal, Remigen, Riniken, Unterbözberg
- Website: oberboezberg.ch

Oberbözberg is a former municipality in the district of Brugg in canton of Aargau in Switzerland. On 1 January 2013 the former municipalities of Gallenkirch, Linn, Oberbözberg and Unterbözberg merged to form the new municipality of Bözberg.

== History ==
Oberbözberg is first mentioned in 1189 as Bozeberch. Until 1873, the municipality was part of Bözberg, which split into Oberbözberg and Unterbözberg.

Aerial view (1950)

== Geography ==
Oberbözberg had an area, as of 2009, of 5.45 square kilometers (2.10 sq mi). Of this area, 2.75 square kilometers (1.06 sq mi) or 50.5% is used for agricultural purposes, while 2.4 square kilometers (0.93 sq mi) or 44.0% is forested. Of the rest of the land, 0.26 square kilometers (0.10 sq mi) or 4.8% is settled (buildings or roads), 0.02 km^{2} (4.9 acres) or 0.4% is either rivers or lakes.

Of the built up area, housing and buildings made up 2.9% and transportation infrastructure made up 1.7%. 43.5% of the total land area is heavily forested. Of the agricultural land, 32.8% is used for growing crops and 14.3% is pastures, while 3.3% is used for orchards or vine crops. All the water in the municipality is in rivers and streams.

The former municipality is located in the Brugg district. It consists of the linear village of Oberbözberg and the hamlet of Ueberthal as well as scattered farms.

== Coat of arms ==
The blazon of the municipal coat of arms is Argent on a Base Vert a Pine Tree of the same and a Deer Gules statant to sinister and regardant.

== Demographics ==
Oberbözberg had a population (as of 2011) of 499. As of June 2009, 7.1% of the population are foreign nationals. Over the last 10 years (1997–2007) the population has changed at a rate of -5%. Most of the population (as of 2000) speaks German (95.5%), with French being second most common ( 0.9%) and English being third ( 0.9%).

The age distribution, as of 2008, in Oberbözberg is; 37 children or 7.7% of the population are between 0 and 9 years old and 77 teenagers or 16.0% are between 10 and 19. Of the adult population, 58 people or 12.0% of the population are between 20 and 29 years old. 41 people or 8.5% are between 30 and 39, 87 people or 18.0% are between 40 and 49, and 95 people or 19.7% are between 50 and 59. The senior population distribution is 49 people or 10.2% of the population are between 60 and 69 years old, 19 people or 3.9% are between 70 and 79, there are 15 people or 3.1% who are between 80 and 89, and there are 4 people or 0.8% who are 90 and older.

As of 2000 the average number of residents per living room was 0.56 which is about equal to the cantonal average of 0.57 per room. In this case, a room is defined as space of a housing unit of at least 4 m^{2} (43 sq ft) as normal bedrooms, dining rooms, living rooms, kitchens and habitable cellars and attics. About 75.4% of the total households were owner occupied, or in other words did not pay rent (though they may have a mortgage or a rent-to-own agreement).

As of 2000, there were 8 homes with 1 or 2 persons in the household, 58 homes with 3 or 4 persons in the household, and 121 homes with 5 or more persons in the household. The average number of people per household was 2.77 individuals. In 2008 there were 127 single family homes (or 59.1% of the total) out of a total of 215 homes and apartments. There were a total of 6 empty apartments for a 2.8% vacancy rate. As of 2007, the construction rate of new housing units was 6.1 new units per 1000 residents.

In the 2007 federal election the most popular party was the SVP which received 41.2% of the vote. The next three most popular parties were the FDP (15.2%), the SP (13.2%) and the CVP (11.3%).

In Oberbözberg about 80.3% of the population (between age 25–64) have completed either non-mandatory upper secondary education or additional higher education (either university or a Fachhochschule). Of the school age population (in the 2008/2009 school year), there are 38 students attending primary school in the municipality.

The historical population is given in the following table:

Historical population
Year	Pop.	±%
1900	283	—
1950	264	−6.7%
2000	534	+102.3%

== Sights ==
The hamlet of Ueberthal is designated as part of the Inventory of Swiss Heritage Sites.

== Economy ==
As of 2007, Oberbözberg had an unemployment rate of 1.18%. As of 2005, there were 67 people employed in the primary economic sector and about 18 businesses involved in this sector. 10 people are employed in the secondary sector and there are 3 businesses in this sector. 36 people are employed in the tertiary sector, with 10 businesses in this sector.

As of 2000 there was a total of 275 workers who lived in the municipality. Of these, 227 or about 82.5% of the residents worked outside Oberbözberg while 20 people commuted into the municipality for work. There were a total of 68 jobs (of at least 6 hours per week) in the municipality. Of the working population, 21.7% used public transportation to get to work, and 52.4% used a private car.

== Religion ==
From the 2000 census, 153 or 28.7% were Roman Catholic, while 304 or 56.9% belonged to the Swiss Reformed Church. Of the rest of the population, there was 1 individual who belonged to the Christian Catholic faith.
