= Brugg District =

Coordinates: 47°29′N 8°12′E

Brugg District Bezirk Brugg
- District
- Country: Switzerland
- Canton: Aargau
- Capital: Brugg

Area
  - Total: 130.08 km^{2} (50.22 sq mi)

Population (2020)
  - Total: 52,042
  - Density: 400.08/km^{2} (1,036.2/sq mi)
- Time zone: UTC+1 (CET)
  - Summer (DST): UTC+2 (CEST)
- Municipalities: 19

Brugg District is a district in the Canton of Aargau, Switzerland. The capital of the district is the town of Brugg.

== Geography ==
Brugg District has an area, as of 1997, of 149.29 km^{2} (57.64 sq mi). Of this area, 42.6% is used for agricultural purposes, while 41.3% is forested. The rest of the land, (14.1%) is settled. It is located around the rivers Aare and Reuss. The northern part of the district, north of the Aare, lies in the Aargau part of the Jura Mountains.

== Demographics ==
Brugg District has a population (as of June 2009) of 46,471.

As of 2000, there were 1,635 homes with 1 or 2 persons in the household, 8,736 homes with 3 or 4 persons in the household, and 6,792 homes with 5 or more persons in the household. The average number of people per household was 2.41 individuals. In 2008 there were 7,550 single family homes (or 36.4% of the total) out of a total of 20,725 homes and apartments. There were a total of 194 empty apartments for a 0.9% vacancy rate.

Of the school age population (in the 2008/2009 school year), there are 3,374 students attending primary school, there are 1,246 students attending secondary school, there are 780 students attending tertiary or university level schooling in the district.

== Economy ==
As of 2000 there were 22,875 residents who worked in the district, while 17,446 residents worked outside the Brugg district and 14,574 people commuted into the district for work.

== Religion ==
From the 2000 census, 13,426 or 30.4% were Roman Catholic, while 20,463 or 46.4% belonged to the Swiss Reformed Church. Of the rest of the population, there were 72 individuals (or about 0.16% of the population) who belonged to the Christian Catholic faith.

== Municipalities ==
Population

| Coat of arms | Municipality | Population 2020 | Area (km^{2}) |
|---|---|---|---|
| Auenstein | Auenstein | 1,613 | 5.68 |
| Birr | Birr | 4,598 | 5.05 |
| Birrhard | Birrhard | 742 | 3 |
| Bözberg | Bözberg | 1,663 | 15.5 |
| Brugg | Brugg | 12,738 | 8.26 |
| Habsburg | Habsburg | 428 | 2.23 |
| Hausen | Hausen bei Brugg | 3,734 | 3.2 |
| Lupfig | Lupfig | 12,679 | 5.15 |
| Mandach | Mandach | 325 | 5.54 |
| Mönthal | Mönthal | 393 | 3.94 |
| Mülligen | Mülligen | 1,074 | 3.16 |
| Remigen | Remigen | 1,326 | 7.87 |
| Riniken | Riniken | 1,482 | 4.76 |
| Rüfenach | Rüfenach | 863 | 4.17 |
| Schinznach | Schinznach | 2,319 | 12.24 |
| Thalheim | Thalheim | 820 | 9.92 |
| Veltheim | Veltheim | 1,526 | 5.24 |
| Villigen | Villigen | 2,120 | 11.21 |
| Windisch | Windisch | 7,733 | 4.91 |
| | Total | 52,042 | 130.08 |

=== Mergers ===
The following changes to the district's municipalities have occurred since 2000:

- 2006: Stilli merged into Villigen
- On 1 January 2010 the municipality of Umiken merged into the municipality of Brugg. On the same date the municipalities of Hottwil in the Brugg district and Etzgen, Mettau, Oberhofen and Wil in the Laufenburg district merged to form the new municipality of Mettauertal. This resulted in Hottwil transferring from Brugg to Laufenburg.
- On 1 January 2013 the former municipalities of Gallenkirch, Linn, Oberbözberg and Unterbözberg merged to form the new municipality of Bözberg.
- 2014: Oberflachs and Schinznach-Dorf combined to create Schinznach.
- On 1 January 2018 the former municipality of Scherz merged into the municipality of Lupfig.
- On 1 January 2020 the former municipality of Schinznach-Bad merged into the municipality of Brugg.
- On 1 January 2022 the former municipalities of Bözen, Effingen and Elfingen in the Brugg district and Hornussen in the Laufenburg district merged to form the new municipality of Böztal.
- On 1 January 2026 the former municipality of Villnachern merged into the municipality of Brugg.

== See also ==
- Linnerberg (Aargau)
