= Stilli =

Former municipality of the canton of Aargau, Switzerland

Sulz
- Former municipality
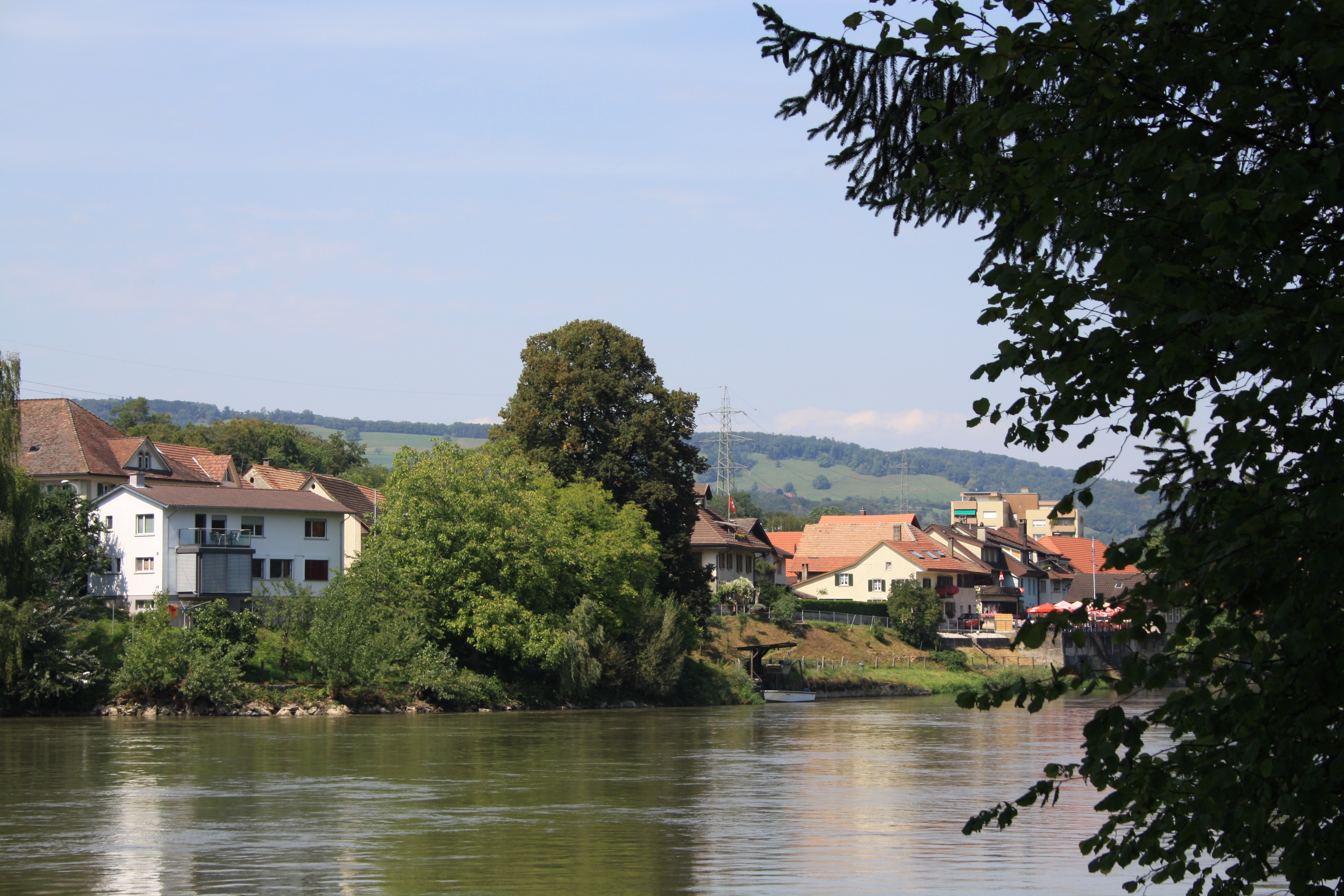

- Flag Coat of arms
- Location of Sulz
- Location within Switzerland Location within Canton of Aargau
- Coordinates: 47°31′03″N 8°13′53″E
- Country: Switzerland
- Canton: Aargau
- District: Brugg

Area
  - Total: 0.57 km^{2} (0.22 sq mi)
- Elevation: 333 m (1,093 ft)

Population (December 2004)
  - Total: 397
  - Density: 700/km^{2} (1,800/sq mi)
- Time zone: UTC+01:00 (CET)
  - Summer (DST): UTC+02:00 (CEST)
- Postal code: 5233
- SFOS number: 4116
- ISO 3166 code: CH-AG
- Surrounded by: Rüfenach, Untersiggenthal, Villigen, Würenlingen
- Website: www.villigen.ch

Stilli is a former municipality of the canton of Aargau, Switzerland. On 1 January 2006, it merged with its neighbouring municipality, Villigen.

Aerial view from 300 m by Walter Mittelholzer (1922)

== Economy ==
In 2000 there was a total of 200 workers who lived in the municipality. Of these, 173 or about 86.5% of the residents worked outside Stilli while 23 people commuted into the municipality for work. There were a total of 50 jobs (of at least 6 hours per week) in the municipality.
