= Iberg Castle, Aargau =

Ruined castle in Riniken, Switzerland

Iberg Castle
- Burgruine Iberg
- Iberg, Riniken
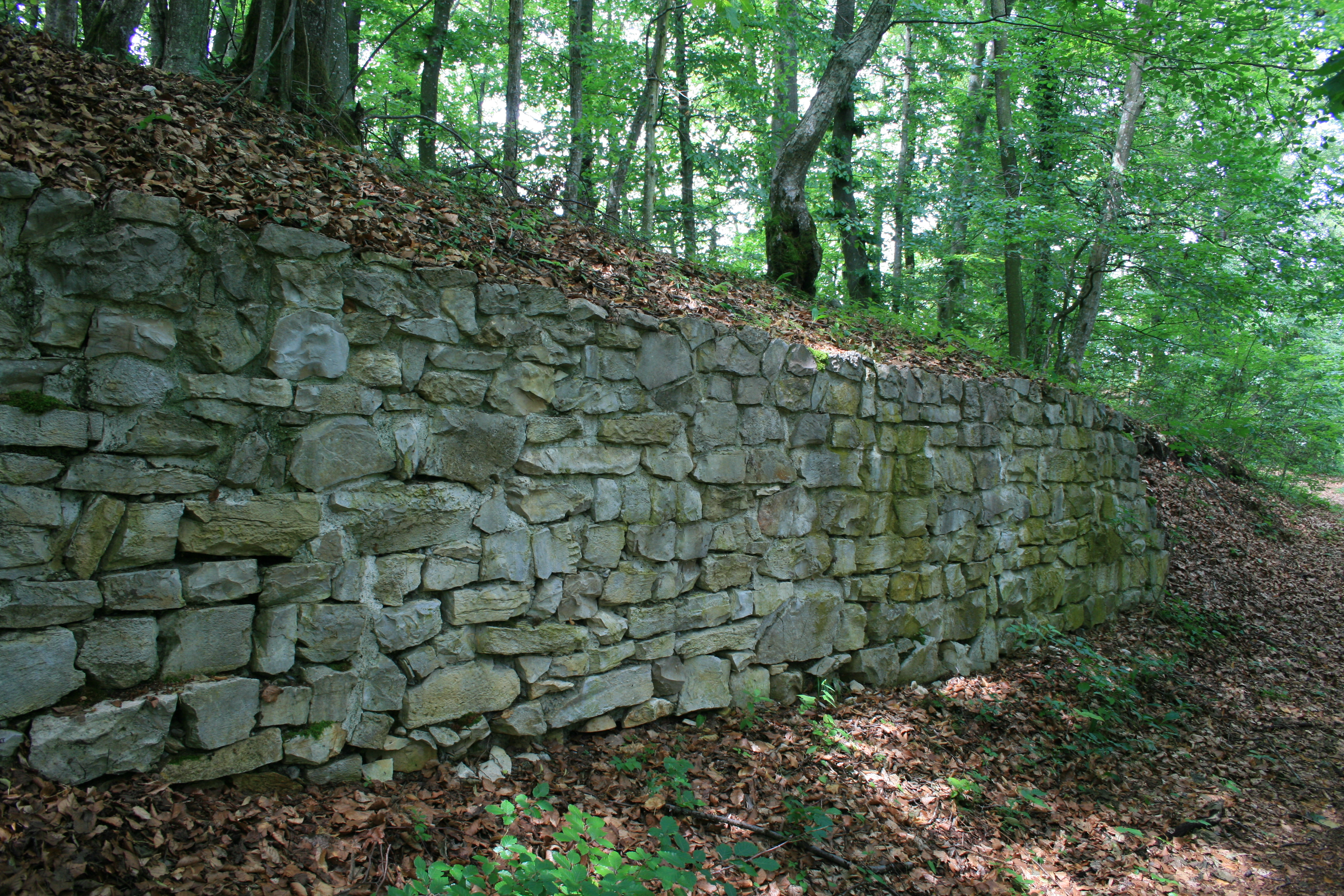

Site information
- Type: hill castle
- Code: CH-AG
- Condition: ruins

Location
- Coordinates: 47°30′20.01″N 8°11′12.64″E

Site history
- Built: 11th century

Iberg Castle (German: Ruine Iberg) is a ruined castle located on Iberg mountain in the municipality of Riniken in the canton of Aargau in Switzerland. Only a few remnants of the ruins are visible.

== Castle History ==
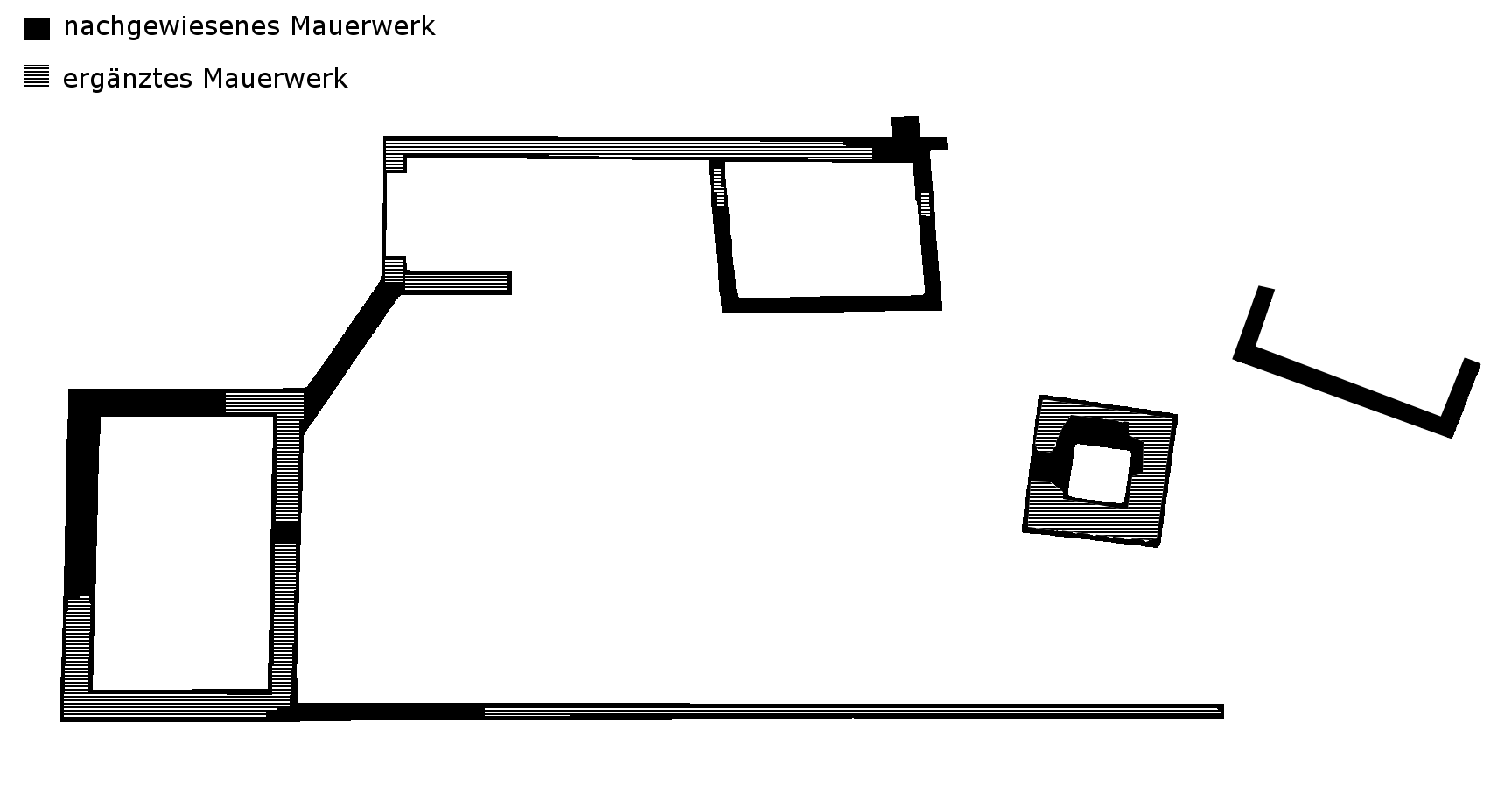
Plan of Iberg Castle

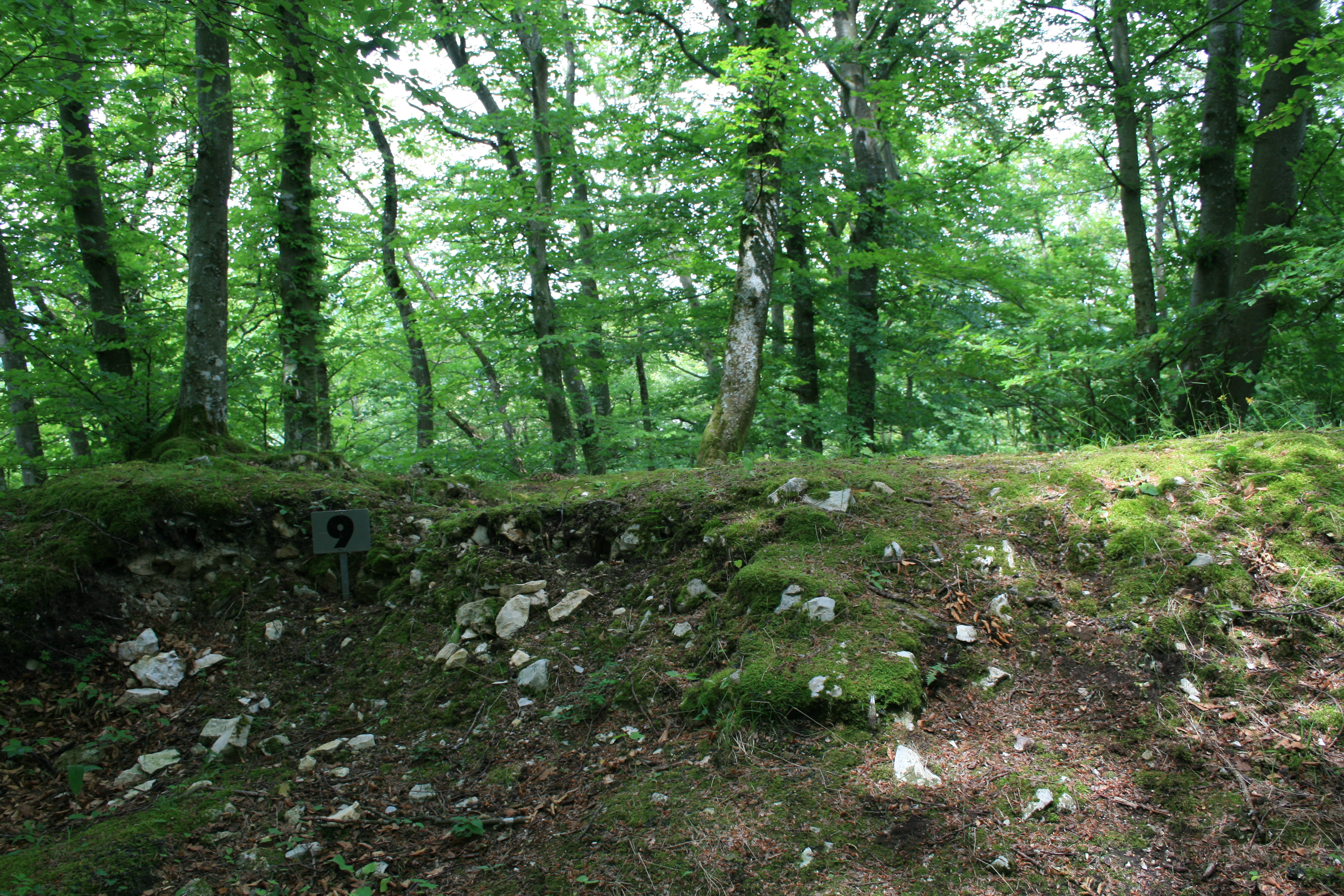
Ruined main tower of the castle

The castle was built in the 11th Century on the northeastern edge of Iberg Mountain. This site consisted of a main building, a gatehouse and two outbuildings. Surrounding the site was the castle moat, which should protect against attacks from the south. As there are no written records of the castle nor the inhabitants, the only information about the castle comes from archaeological investigations. The castle was abandoned around 1200 or possibly later, at the end of the 12th or at the beginning of the 13th Century when a fire destroyed the castle. During reconstruction, the moat was expanded and additional towers were added. However, the castle was abandoned before completion of work, possibly due to resistance from Murbach Abbey.

Since the area around the castle was held by the House of Habsburg and Murbach Abbey, it is likely that the castle was founded by the Habsburgs or by a Habsburg vassal.

== See also ==
- List of castles and fortresses in Switzerland
