= Remigen =

- Municipality
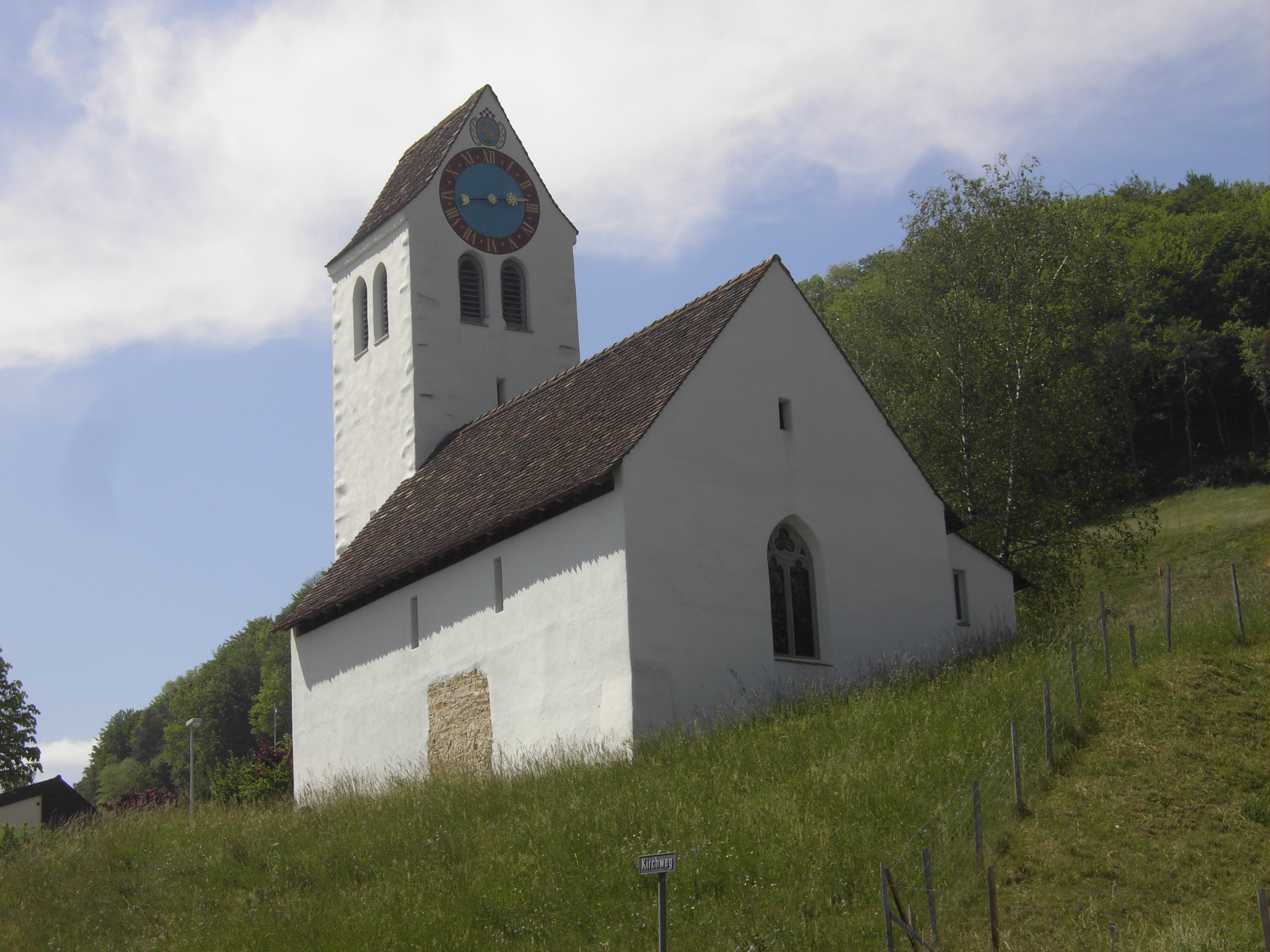

- Flag Coat of arms
- Location of Remigen
- Location within Switzerland Location within Canton of Aargau
- Coordinates: 47°31′N 8°11′E
- Country: Switzerland
- Canton: Aargau
- District: Brugg

Area
  - Total: 7.87 km^{2} (3.04 sq mi)
- Elevation: 394 m (1,293 ft)

Population (December 2020)
  - Total: 1,326
  - Density: 168/km^{2} (436/sq mi)
- Time zone: UTC+01:00 (CET)
  - Summer (DST): UTC+02:00 (CEST)
- Postal code: 5236
- SFOS number: 4110
- ISO 3166 code: CH-AG
- Surrounded by: Gansingen, Hottwil, Mönthal, Oberbözberg, Riniken, Rüfenach, Villigen
- Website: remigen.ch

Remigen is a municipality in the district of Brugg in the canton of Aargau in Switzerland.

== History ==
Aerial view (1945)

Already in Roman times the road between Augusta Raurica and Vindonissa led over the Bözberg, although it was further north than the present-day route, from Effingen via Remigen to Stilli. The village is first recorded in 1064 as part of the domain of Rein, which belonged to the Benedictine monastery of Murbach in Alsace. Domain meant lordship of land covering a larger district. Remigen is first mentioned in 1227 as Raemingen.

In the 13th century the Habsburgs consolidated their lordship rights in the district around Brugg in the court of Bözberg. This included about 9 present-day parishes in the area, in all of which the Habsburgs had legal jurisdiction of various kinds. In 1291 the domain of Rein was purchased by King Rudolf I of Habsburg, who was thus the most significant landowner in the area as well as the most senior judge. In 1345 Queen Agnes of Hungary gifted the domain to the convent of the Poor Clares in Wittichen in the Black Forest.

In 1460 the city of Bern conquered the district west of the Aare river, but made no change to the rights of the convent. However, in 1528 the Catholic nuns had to submit to the introduction of the Protestant Reformation. In 1544 the convent sold the domain to Count Hartmann of Hallwyl. In 1566 the jurisdiction of the court at Bözberg was subdivided, and from then on the domain's legal cases were heard at the neighbouring village of Stilli. Between 1588 and 1599 the town of Brugg acquired two-thirds of the domain, and the city of Bern the remaining one-third.

In March 1798 the French conquered Switzerland, took away the powers of the merciful Lords of Bern, and proclaimed the Helvetic Republic. The domain of Rein became part of the newly formed canton of Aargau. In 1799 the front line of the Napoleonic Wars ran through the middle of the lower Aar valley, and there were several French Army encampments in the area. The inhabitants of the local villages suffered great penury due to the army's requisitioning and plundering.

In 1803 the domain was dissolved, and each village gained parish status. Remigen had a mainly agricultural character until well into the 20th century. The population remained at around 500 until 1970, but has doubled since then: there was much building, and Remigen developed into a dormitory town.

== Geography ==
It lies about 2 miles (3.2 km) NNW of Brugg, at a transition point between two areas of the Jura, in the North-west corner of the plain of Rüfenach. However the parish only extends as far as the steep southern slope: the extensive neighbouring 2,000 ft (610 m) high plateau belongs to Villigen. The southern slope of the Geissberg is a perfect location for a vineyard. To the west stretch two valleys separated by the Bützeberg (2100 ft). The northern of the two valleys leads to the Bürersteig (1800 ft), a pass leading to the Rhine valley. The southern valley leads in the direction of the Mönthal valley. The extreme westerly point of the parish is the Burghalde (2100 ft). The height ranges from 1,200 ft (370 m) to 2,300 ft (700 m).

Remigen has an area, as of 2009, of 7.87 square kilometers (3.04 sq mi). Of this area, 2.87 square kilometers (1.11 sq mi) or 36.5% is used for agricultural purposes, while 4.44 square kilometers (1.71 sq mi) or 56.4% is forested. Of the rest of the land, 0.56 square kilometers (0.22 sq mi) or 7.1% is settled (buildings or roads), 0.01 km^{2} (2.5 acres) or 0.1% is either rivers or lakes and 0.03 km^{2} (7.4 acres) or 0.4% is unproductive land.

Of the built up area, housing and buildings made up 2.4% and transportation infrastructure made up 3.3%. 54.8% of the total land area is heavily forested and 1.7% is covered with orchards or small clusters of trees. Of the agricultural land, 23.0% is used for growing crops and 8.5% is pastures, while 5.0% is used for orchards or vine crops. All the water in the municipality is in rivers and streams. Of the unproductive areas, and .

== Coat of arms ==
The blazon of the municipal coat of arms is Gules an Ibex salient Argent on Coupeaux Vert. They originated from one of the Lords of Remigen. These arms first appeared on the official seal in 1750.

== Demographics ==
Remigen has a population (as of December 2020) of 1,326 As of June 2009, 13.2% of the population are foreign nationals. Over the last 10 years (1997–2007) the population has changed at a rate of -5%. Most of the population (as of 2000) speaks German (93.3%), with French being second most common ( 1.8%) and Albanian being third ( 1.6%).

The age distribution, as of 2008, in Remigen is; 84 children or 8.2% of the population are between 0 and 9 years old and 123 teenagers or 12.0% are between 10 and 19. Of the adult population, 152 people or 14.8% of the population are between 20 and 29 years old. 113 people or 11.0% are between 30 and 39, 147 people or 14.3% are between 40 and 49, and 197 people or 19.2% are between 50 and 59. The senior population distribution is 123 people or 12.0% of the population are between 60 and 69 years old, 57 people or 5.6% are between 70 and 79, there are 26 people or 2.5% who are between 80 and 89, and there are 5 people or 0.5% who are 90 and older.

As of 2000, there were 30 homes with 1 or 2 persons in the household, 148 homes with 3 or 4 persons in the household, and 189 homes with 5 or more persons in the household. The average number of people per household was 2.76 individuals. In 2008 there were 204 single family homes (or 45.9% of the total) out of a total of 444 homes and apartments. There were a total of 7 empty apartments for a 1.6% vacancy rate. As of 2007, the construction rate of new housing units was 1 new units per 1000 residents.

In Remigen about 80.6% of the population (between age 25–64) have completed either non-mandatory upper secondary education or additional higher education (either university or a Fachhochschule). Of the school age population (in the 2008/2009 school year), there are 76 students attending primary school in the municipality.

The historical population is given in the following table:

Historical population
Year	Pop.	±%
1764	318	—
1850	690	+117.0%
1900	511	−25.9%
1950	511	+0.0%
1980	662	+29.5%
2000	1,050	+58.6%
2012	1,064	+1.3%

== Politics ==
In the 2007 federal election the most popular party was the SVP which received 40% of the vote. The next three most popular parties were the SP (15%), the FDP (14.5%) and the CVP (11.6%).

Local laws are made by the parish assembly of voters, with a five-member executive parish council elected on the "first-past-the-post" system for a four-year term. The chairman of the council for 2006-2009 is Paul Stalder.

== Economy ==
As of 2007, Remigen had an unemployment rate of 2.25%. As of 2005, there were 76 people employed in the primary economic sector and about 19 businesses involved in this sector. 110 people are employed in the secondary sector and there are 13 businesses in this sector. 109 people are employed in the tertiary sector, with 29 businesses in this sector.

As of 2000 there was a total of 554 workers who lived in the municipality. Of these, 441 or about 79.6% of the residents worked outside Remigen while 106 people commuted into the municipality for work. There were a total of 219 jobs (of at least 6 hours per week) in the municipality. Of the working population, 12.3% used public transportation to get to work, and 58.5% used a private car.

The village is on the main road from Stilli to Laufenburg over the Bürersteig pass, and on two postbus routes. There is a kindergarten and a primary school. The nearest secondary schools are in neighbouring towns.

== Religion ==
From the 2000 census, 275 or 26.1% were Roman Catholic, while 624 or 59.3% belonged to the Swiss Reformed Church. Of the rest of the population, there was 1 individual who belonged to the Christian Catholic faith.

== Tourism and institutions ==
The main tourist sight in the village is St Peter's church, which is first recorded in 1347 as a subsidiary church of the ecclesiastical parish of Rein and is presumed to have originated in the 11th or 12th century. The church was extended around 1450, and around 1550 the church tower was added. The tower clock has only an hour hand and no minute hand. In the 19th century and the first half of the 20th century the church was used for various purposes: to store equipment used in the vineyards, as a poorhouse, and for a short time even as a prison.
