= Riniken =

- Municipality
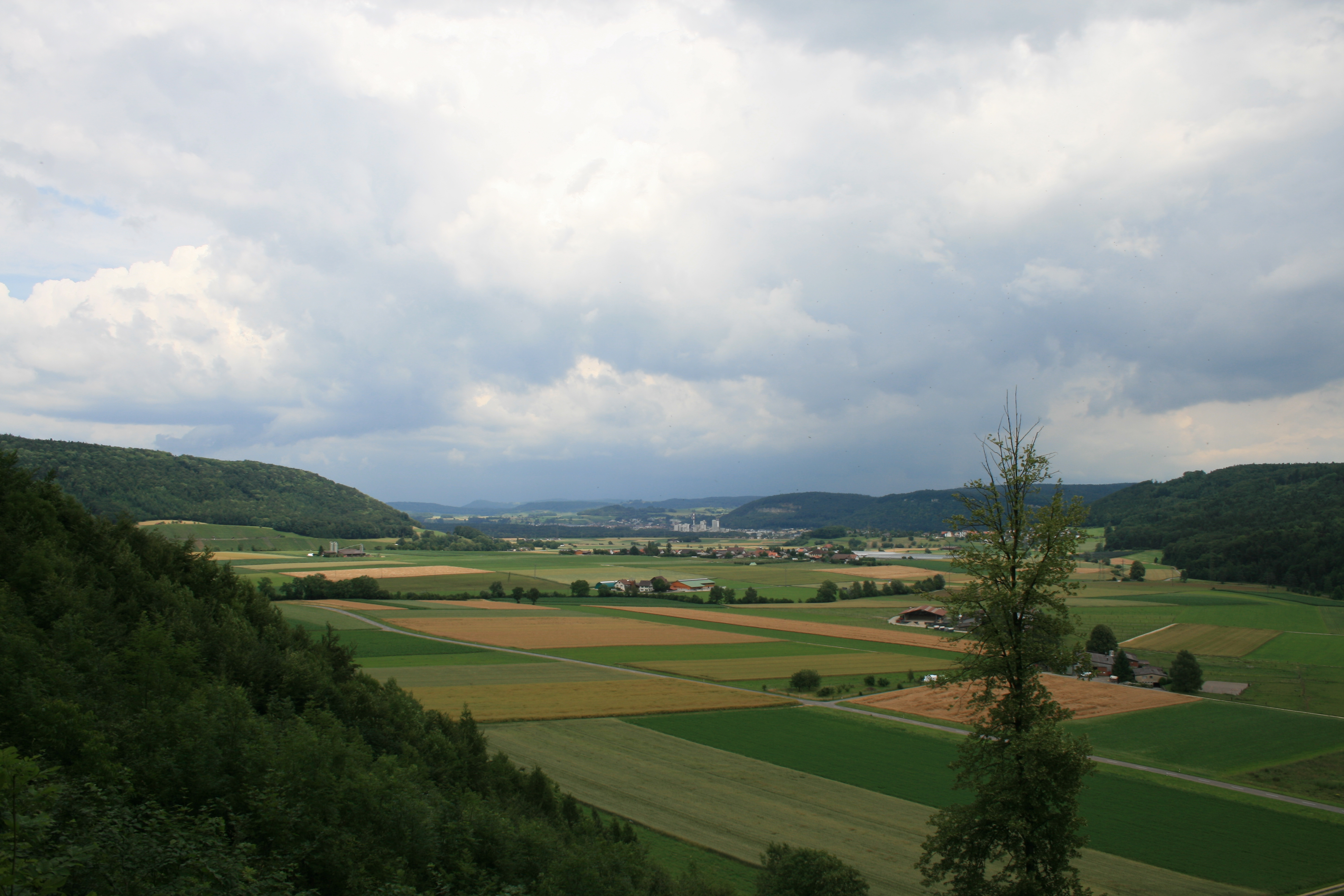

- Flag Coat of arms
- Location of Riniken
- Location within Switzerland Location within Canton of Aargau
- Coordinates: 47°30′N 8°11′E
- Country: Switzerland
- Canton: Aargau
- District: Brugg

Area
  - Total: 4.75 km^{2} (1.83 sq mi)
- Elevation: 387 m (1,270 ft)

Population (December 2020)
  - Total: 1,482
  - Density: 312/km^{2} (808/sq mi)
- Time zone: UTC+01:00 (CET)
  - Summer (DST): UTC+02:00 (CEST)
- Postal code: 5223
- SFOS number: 4111
- ISO 3166 code: CH-AG
- Surrounded by: Brugg, Oberbözberg, Remigen, Rüfenach, Umiken, Unterbözberg
- Website: riniken.ch

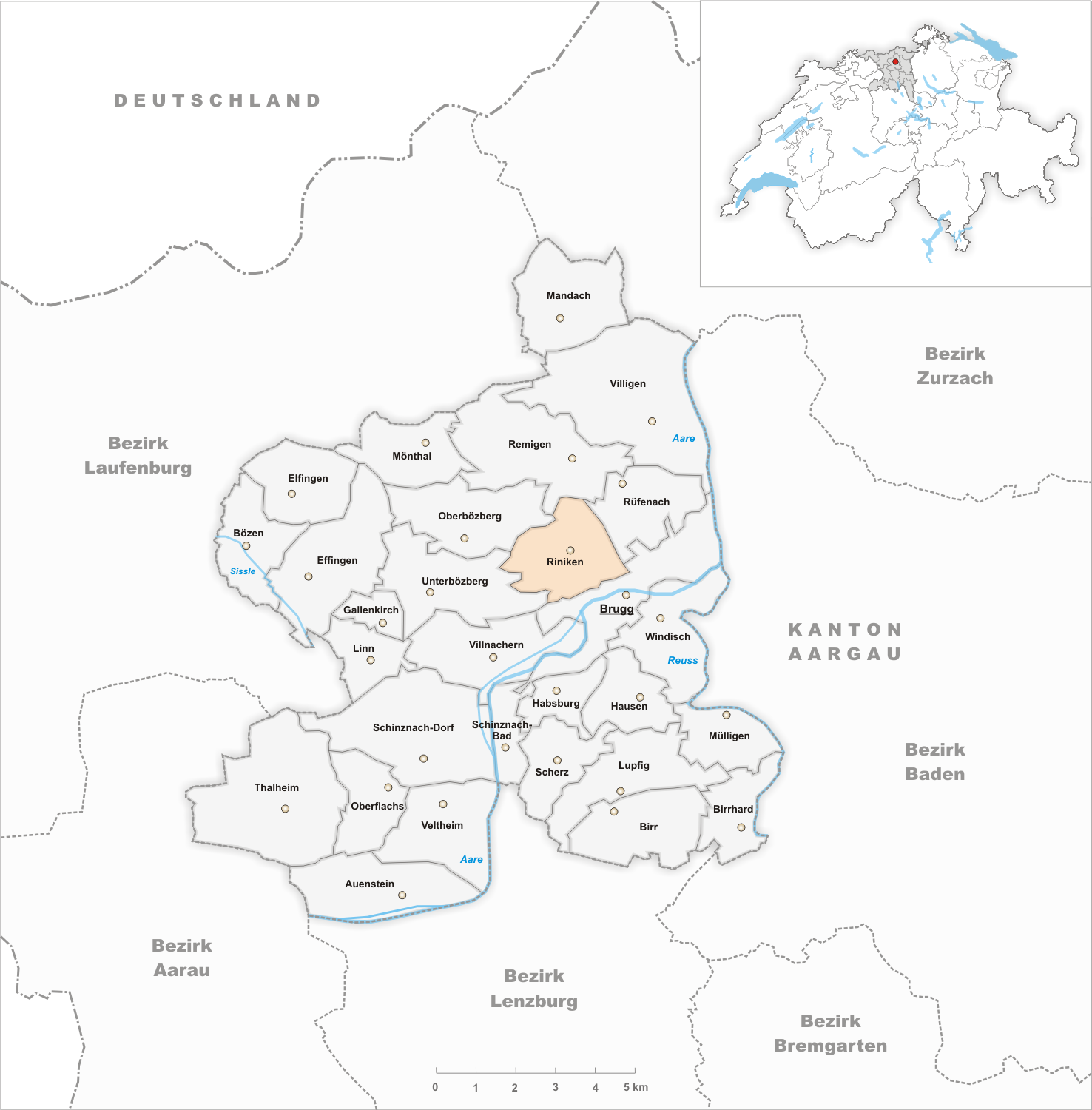
Riniken

Riniken is a municipality in the district of Brugg in the canton of Aargau in Switzerland.

== History ==
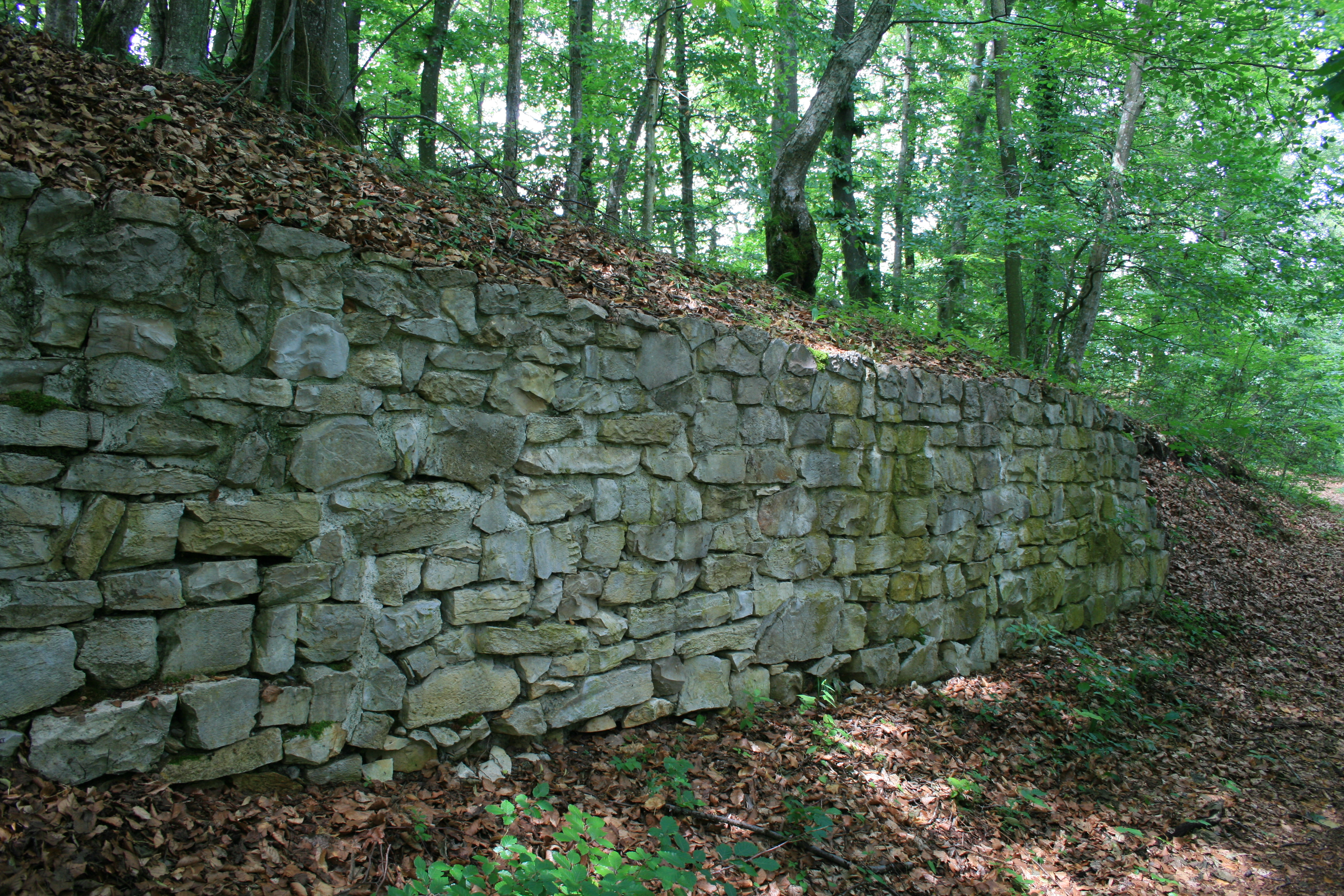
Ruined wall of Iberg Cadastle

While Iberg Castle was built in the 11th Century and abandoned in 1200, the village of Riniken is first mentioned in 1253 as Rinikon. The rights to high justice were held by the Habsburgs until 1460, when the rights went to the bailiwick of Schenkenberg under the city of Bern. The low justice right was held, until 1406, by Königsfelden Abbey and after the Protestant Reformation those rights transferred to Bözberg.

Religiously, Riniken belonged to the Umiken parish. In 1967 the village received a private cemetery, and in 1978 an ecumenical ecclesiastical center.

Starting in 1712, there was a migration of villagers to Dättwil (now part of Baden), as agriculture offered very little money. There was never any industry in Riniken, but in 1960 about half of the workforce worked in the second sector. The recent population growth is mainly due to commuters who have moved into the municipality.

== Geography ==
Riniken has an area, as of 2009, of 4.75 square kilometers (1.83 sq mi). Of this area, 1.45 square kilometers (0.56 sq mi) or 30.5% is used for agricultural purposes, while 2.7 square kilometers (1.0 sq mi) or 56.8% is forested. Of the rest of the land, 0.59 square kilometers (0.23 sq mi) or 12.4% is settled (buildings or roads) and 0.01 km^{2} (2.5 acres) or 0.2% is unproductive land.

Of the built up area, housing and buildings made up 6.7% and transportation infrastructure made up 4.0%. 56.4% of the total land area is heavily forested. Of the agricultural land, 18.9% is used for growing crops and 10.7% is pastures.

The municipality is located in the Brugg district. It consists of the former linear village of Riniken and the hamlets of Neuriniken.

== Coat of arms ==
The blazon of the municipal coat of arms is Or a Pine Tree Vert trunked proper issuant from Coupeaux of the second.

== Demographics ==
Riniken has a population (as of December 2020) of 1,482 As of June 2009, 16.3% of the population are foreign nationals. Over the last 10 years (1997–2007) the population has changed at a rate of 0.6%. Most of the population (as of 2000) speaks German (88.5%), with Albanian being second most common ( 2.3%) and Italian being third ( 1.5%).

The age distribution, as of 2008, in Riniken is; 126 children or 8.9% of the population are between 0 and 9 years old and 165 teenagers or 11.7% are between 10 and 19. Of the adult population, 174 people or 12.3% of the population are between 20 and 29 years old. 173 people or 12.3% are between 30 and 39, 220 people or 15.6% are between 40 and 49, and 196 people or 13.9% are between 50 and 59. The senior population distribution is 182 people or 12.9% of the population are between 60 and 69 years old, 125 people or 8.9% are between 70 and 79, there are 44 people or 3.1% who are between 80 and 89, and there are 6 people or 0.4% who are 90 and older.

As of 2000, there were 24 homes with 1 or 2 persons in the household, 283 homes with 3 or 4 persons in the household, and 233 homes with 5 or more persons in the household. The average number of people per household was 2.47 individuals. In 2008 there were 278 single family homes (or 43.6% of the total) out of a total of 637 homes and apartments. There were a total of 12 empty apartments for a 1.9% vacancy rate. As of 2007, the construction rate of new housing units was 4.3 new units per 1000 residents.

In the 2007 federal election the most popular party was the SVP which received 35.3% of the vote. The next three most popular parties were the SP (18.2%), the FDP (15.7%) and the CVP (12.2%).

In Riniken about 79.2% of the population (between age 25–64) have completed either non-mandatory upper secondary education or additional higher education (either university or a Fachhochschule). Of the school age population (in the 2008/2009 school year), there are 103 students attending primary school in the municipality.

The historical population is given in the following table:

Historical population
Year	Pop.	±%
1764	213	—
1831	424	+99.1%
1850	338	−20.3%
1888	272	−19.5%
1900	291	+7.0%
1950	300	+3.1%
1970	947	+215.7%
2000	1,369	+44.6%

== Economy ==
As of 2007, Riniken had an unemployment rate of 1.99%. As of 2005, there were 28 people employed in the primary economic sector and about 10 businesses involved in this sector. 80 people are employed in the secondary sector and there are 12 businesses in this sector. 80 people are employed in the tertiary sector, with 21 businesses in this sector.

As of 2000 there was a total of 697 workers who lived in the municipality. Of these, 596 or about 85.5% of the residents worked outside Riniken while 73 people commuted into the municipality for work. There were a total of 174 jobs (of at least 6 hours per week) in the municipality. Of the working population, 21.1% used public transportation to get to work, and 54.1% used a private car.

== Religion ==
From the 2000 census, 416 or 30.4% were Roman Catholic, while 713 or 52.1% belonged to the Swiss Reformed Church. Of the rest of the population, there was 1 individual who belonged to the Christian Catholic faith.
