= Mönthal =

- Municipality
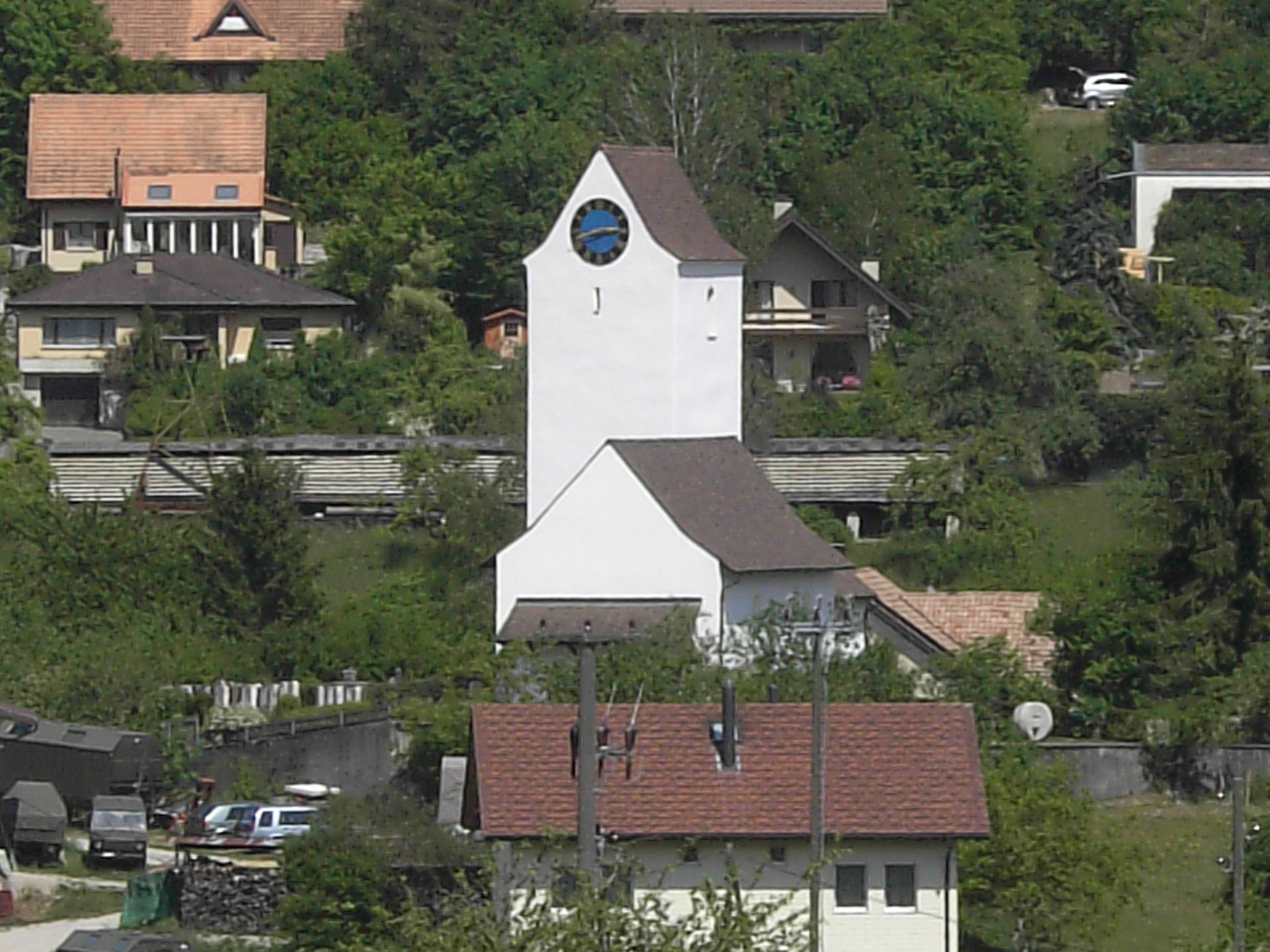

- Flag Coat of arms
- Location of Mönthal
- Location within Switzerland Location within Canton of Aargau
- Coordinates: 47°31′N 8°8′E
- Country: Switzerland
- Canton: Aargau
- District: Brugg

Area
  - Total: 3.93 km^{2} (1.52 sq mi)
- Elevation: 479 m (1,572 ft)

Population (December 2020)
  - Total: 393
  - Density: 100/km^{2} (259/sq mi)
- Time zone: UTC+01:00 (CET)
  - Summer (DST): UTC+02:00 (CEST)
- Postal code: 5237
- SFOS number: 4106
- ISO 3166 code: CH-AG
- Surrounded by: Effingen, Elfingen, Gansingen, Oberbözberg, Remigen, Sulz
- Website: moenthal.ch

Mönthal is a municipality in the district of Brugg in canton of Aargau in Switzerland.

== History ==
Aerial view (1950)

Originally, it was a fortified late Bronze Age hilltop settlement. Additionally, a Roman bronze figure was discovered in the village. During the High Middle Ages there were a number of small settlements in the area. Some of these houses still exist, while others (such as Bernbrunnen, which was mentioned as an independent village about 1300) have vanished. Mönthal is first mentioned about 1273 as Muenuntal. The low and high justice rights were held by the Habsburgs, until 1460 when they went to Bern. Under Bern it was part of the Schenkenberg bailiwick with the court in Stilli.

St. George's church was first mentioned in 1273. After 1380 the rights to the church collection and the appointment of the minister was held by Brugg. After 1860 Mönthal was an independent Reformed parish, though in 2007 it merged into the Bözberg parish.

Starting in 1630, the village had its own school, though the building dates from 1820.

Starting in the 18th century the village had a certain prosperity through viticulture and home production of linen and cotton. However, starting in 1850, the population and economy decreased. It wasn't until 1970 that the population started to grow, though this was mostly commuters into the region of Baden-Brugg.

== Geography ==
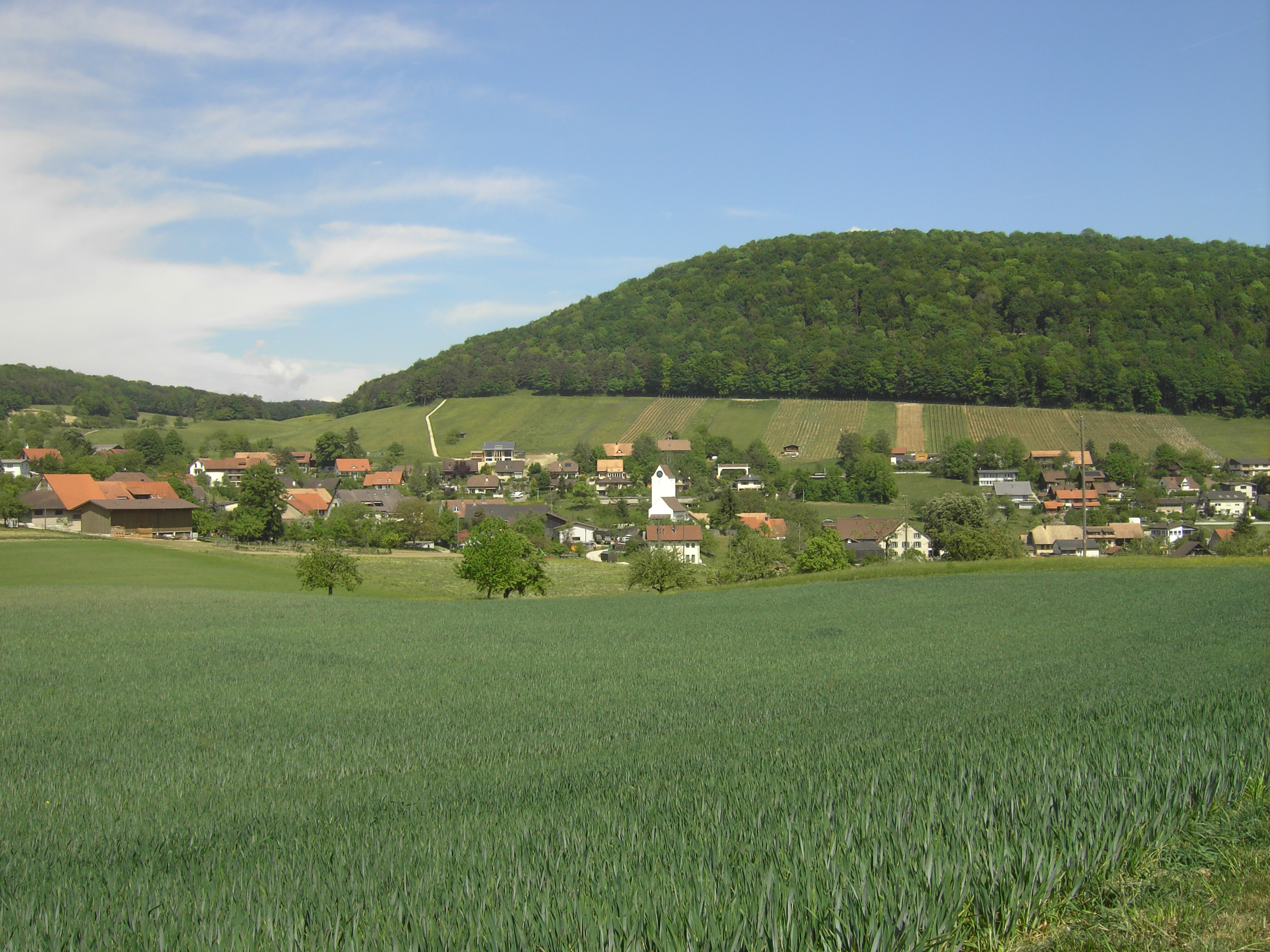
Möhntal

Mönthal has an area, as of 2009, of 3.93 square kilometers (1.52 sq mi). Of this area, 1.78 square kilometers (0.69 sq mi) or 45.3% is used for agricultural purposes, while 1.81 square kilometers (0.70 sq mi) or 46.1% is forested. Of the rest of the land, 0.34 square kilometers (0.13 sq mi) or 8.7% is settled (buildings or roads).

Of the built up area, housing and buildings made up 4.6% and transportation infrastructure made up 3.1%. 44.0% of the total land area is heavily forested and 2.0% is covered with orchards or small clusters of trees. Of the agricultural land, 20.6% is used for growing crops and 22.9% is pastures, while 1.8% is used for orchards or vine crops.

The municipality is located in the Brugg district, in a Jura valley between Brugg and Laufenburg. It consists of the village of Mönthal and the hamlets of Ampfern on the Ampfernhöhe as well as scattered villages.

== Coat of arms ==
The blazon of the municipal coat of arms is Azure three piles inverted Or topped with as many Mullets of the same in chief.

== Demographics ==
Mönthal has a population (as of December 2020) of 393 As of June 2009, 8.8% of the population are foreign nationals. Over the last 10 years (1997–2007) the population has changed at a rate of -4.1%. Most of the population (as of 2000) speaks German (95.2%), with French being second most common ( 1.3%) and Albanian being third ( 1.3%).

The age distribution, as of 2008, in Mönthal is; 20 children or 4.9% of the population are between 0 and 9 years old and 55 teenagers or 13.3% are between 10 and 19. Of the adult population, 46 people or 11.2% of the population are between 20 and 29 years old. 42 people or 10.2% are between 30 and 39, 72 people or 17.5% are between 40 and 49, and 84 people or 20.4% are between 50 and 59. The senior population distribution is 58 people or 14.1% of the population are between 60 and 69 years old, 27 people or 6.6% are between 70 and 79, there are 8 people or 1.9% who are between 80 and 89.

As of 2000 the average number of residents per living room was 0.6 which is about equal to the cantonal average of 0.57 per room. In this case, a room is defined as space of a housing unit of at least 4 m^{2} (43 sq ft) as normal bedrooms, dining rooms, living rooms, kitchens and habitable cellars and attics.

About 67.1% of the total households were owner occupied, or in other words did not pay rent (though they may have a mortgage or a rent-to-own agreement). As of 2000, there were 12 homes with 1 or 2 persons in the household, 54 homes with 3 or 4 persons in the household, and 74 homes with 5 or more persons in the household. The average number of people per household was 2.66 individuals. In 2008 there were 103 single family homes (or 58.5% of the total) out of a total of 176 homes and apartments. There were a total of 3 empty apartments for a 1.7% vacancy rate. As of 2007, the construction rate of new housing units was 9.6 new units per 1000 residents.

In the 2007 federal election the most popular party was the SVP which received 45.1% of the vote. The next three most popular parties were the FDP (13.8%), the CVP (11.1%) and the Green Party (10.3%).

In Mönthal about 71.2% of the population (between age 25 and 64) have completed either non-mandatory upper secondary education or additional higher education (either university or a Fachhochschule). Of the school age population (in the 2008/2009 school year) in the municipality.

The historical population is given in the following table:

Historical population
| Year | Pop. | ±% |
|---|---|---|
| 1764 | 253 | — |
| 1850 | 515 | +103.6% |
| 1900 | 333 | −35.3% |
| 1950 | 257 | −22.8% |
| 1970 | 239 | −7.0% |
| 2000 | 441 | +84.5% |

== Economy ==
As of 2007, Mönthal had an unemployment rate of 3.08%. As of 2005, there were 19 people employed in the primary economic sector and about 10 businesses involved in this sector. 25 people are employed in the secondary sector and there are 5 businesses in this sector. 20 people are employed in the tertiary sector, with 9 businesses in this sector.

As of 2000 there was a total of 218 workers who lived in the municipality. Of these, 187 or about 85.8% of the residents worked outside Mönthal while 24 people commuted into the municipality for work. There were a total of 55 jobs (of at least 6 hours per week) in the municipality. Of the working population, 12.9% used public transportation to get to work, and 56.3% used a private car.

== Religion ==
From the 2000 census, 107 or 26.9% were Roman Catholic, while 204 or 51.3% belonged to the Swiss Reformed Church. Of the rest of the population, there were 6 individuals (or about 1.51% of the population) who belonged to the Christian Catholic faith.
