= Birr, Aargau =

Birr
- Municipality
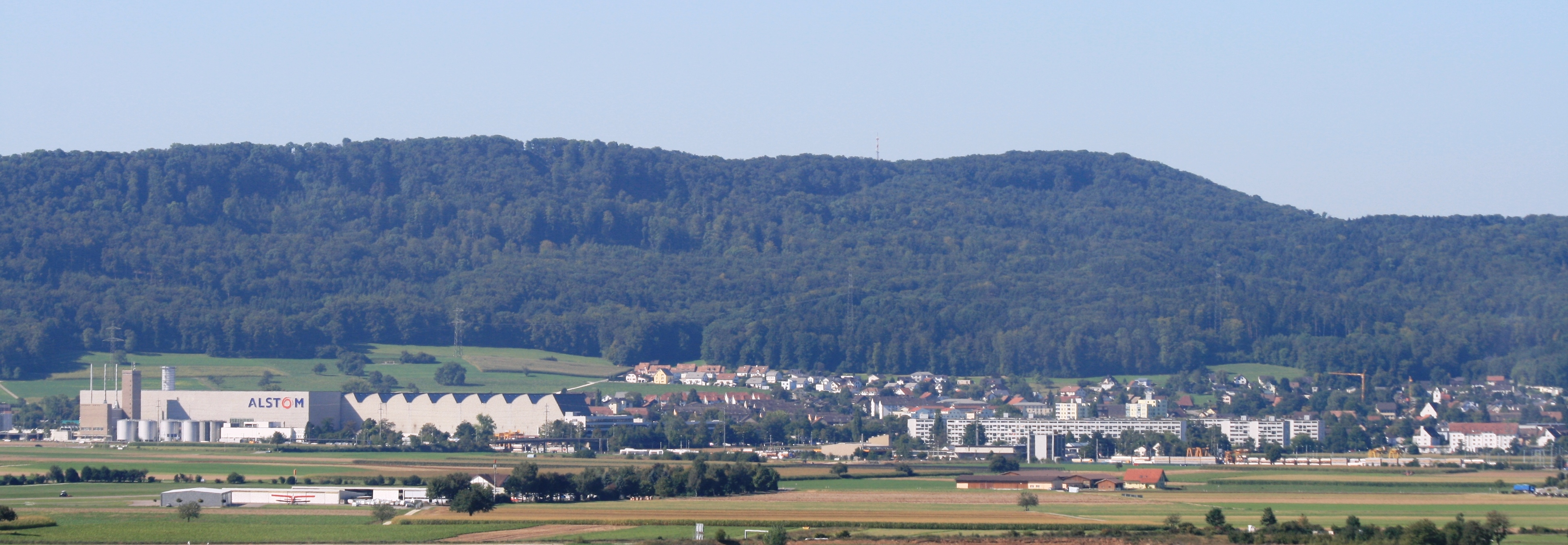

- Flag Coat of arms
- Location of Birr
- Location within Switzerland Location within Canton of Aargau
- Coordinates: 47°26′N 8°12′E
- Country: Switzerland
- Canton: Aargau
- District: Brugg

Government
  - Mayor: René Grütter

Area
  - Total: 5.05 km^{2} (1.95 sq mi)
- Elevation: 352 m (1,155 ft)

Population (December 2020)
  - Total: 4,598
  - Density: 910/km^{2} (2,360/sq mi)
- Time zone: UTC+01:00 (CET)
  - Summer (DST): UTC+02:00 (CEST)
- Postal code: 5242
- SFOS number: 4092
- ISO 3166 code: CH-AG
- Surrounded by: Birrhard, Brunegg, Lupfig, Möriken-Wildegg
- Website: birr.ch

Birr is a municipality in the Swiss canton of Aargau. The village lies halfway between Lenzburg and Brugg. Birr has grown with its neighbour Lupfig into a conurbation.

Birr is known as one of the places where the Swiss educator Johann Heinrich Pestalozzi established new standards in education. His gravesite in Birr is listed as a heritage site of national significance.

Aerial view (1963)

== History ==
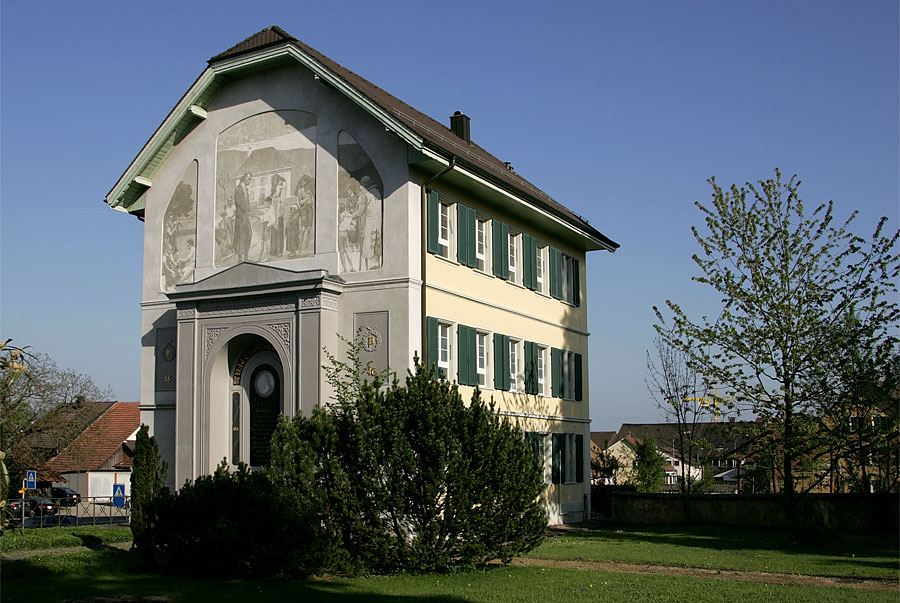
Old school house in Birr, with the Pestalozzi memorial

While a few artifacts from the Roman and Alamanni eras have been found in Birr, there was no known settlement. Birr is first mentioned in 1270 as Bire. Throughout the High Middle Ages the village belonged to the Habsburgs. The rights to rule the village went to Königsfelden Abbey at Windisch in 1397 and 1411. After the secularization of the monastery in 1528 those rights transferred to Bern.

The chapel, which was a subsidiary of Windisch, became a parish church during the Reformation. This parish includes Lupfig, Birrhard, Scherz, Schinznach-Bad and Brunegg. The current reformed church was built in 1662 by Abraham Dünz.

In 1771, Johann Heinrich Pestalozzi bought a piece of waste land called Neuhof (New Farm), where he attempted the cultivation of madder. Pestalozzi knew nothing of business, and the plan failed. Before this he had opened his farm-house as a school, but that plan also met with failure. His later attempts at founding schools and education theory were more successful. However, following an 1815 rebellion among the teachers of his school, his last ten years were marred by weariness and sorrow. In 1825 he retired to Neuhof, the place of his youth, and after writing the adventures of his life, and his last work, the Swans Song, he died at Brugg. Since 1914, Neuhof has served as a reform school.

After 1950 Birr changed from an agricultural to an industrial village. The arrival of BBC (a factory for the manufacture of rotating electrical machinery) in 1957-65 along with a 500 apartment housing development, resulted in a strong growth spurt. By 1990 the working population included commuters (73%), industrial workers (46%) and foreigners (44%). Only about 1% of the population worked in agriculture.

== Geography ==
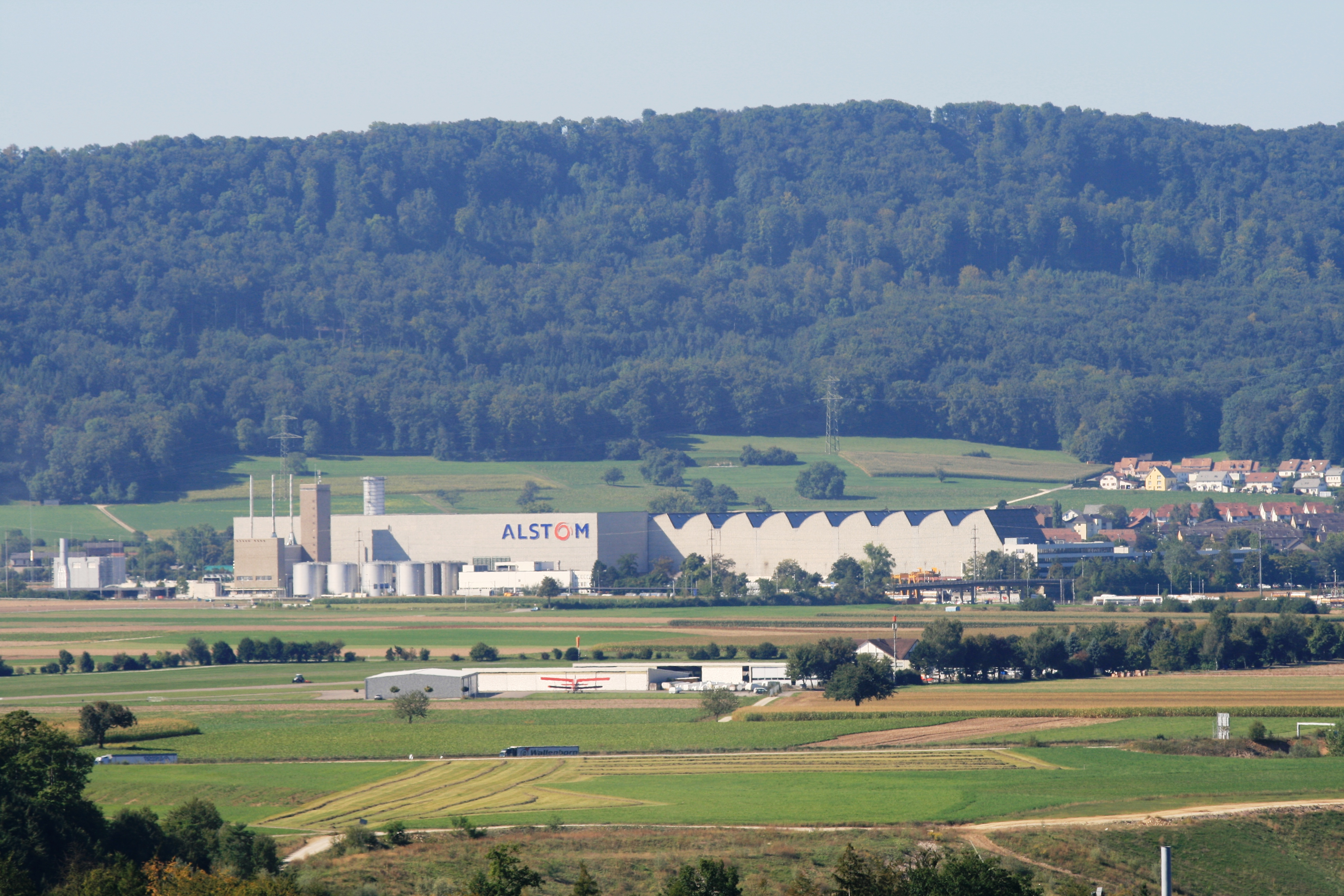
GE factory in Birr

Birr has an area, as of 2007, of 5.05 square kilometers (1.95 sq mi). Of this area, 1.77 square kilometers (0.68 sq mi) or 35.0% is used for agricultural purposes, while1.76 square kilometers (0.68 sq mi) or 34.9% is forested. Of the rest of the land, 1.51 square kilometers (0.58 sq mi) or 29.9% is settled (buildings or roads).

Of the built up area, industrial buildings made up 7.9% of the total area while housing and buildings made up 11.3% and transportation infrastructure made up 5.1%. Power and water infrastructure as well as other special developed areas made up 4.0% of the area while parks, green belts and sports fields made up 1.6%. 34.9% of the total land area was heavily forested. Of the agricultural land, 29.1% is used for growing crops and 4.2% is pastures, while 1.8% is used for orchards or vine crops.

The municipality is located on the western edge of the Birrfelds, and has grown together with the municipality of Lupfig to the north. It consists of the haufendorf village (an irregular, unplanned and quite closely packed village, built around a central square) of Birr. The municipalities of Birr and Birrhard are considering a merger on 1 January 2014 into a new municipality which will be known as Birr.

== Coat of arms ==
The blazon of the municipal coat of arms is Azure a Pear Or slipped and leaved Vert. This is an example of canting because of the pear (German: Birne).

== Demographics ==
Birr has a population (as of December 2020) of 4,598. As of June 2009 44.5% of the population are foreign nationals. Over the last 10 years (1997–2007) the population has changed at a rate of 18.7%. Most of the population (as of 2000) speaks German (71.2%), with Italian being second most common ( 7.2%) and Serbo-Croatian being third ( 6.7%).

The age distribution, as of 2008, in Birr is; 488 children or 12.0% of the population are between 0 and 9 years old and 524 teenagers or 12.9% are between 10 and 19. Of the adult population, 592 people or 14.6% of the population are between 20 and 29 years old. 568 people or 14.0% are between 30 and 39, 639 people or 15.7% are between 40 and 49, and 556 people or 13.7% are between 50 and 59. The senior population distribution is 405 people or 10.0% of the population are between 60 and 69 years old, 212 people or 5.2% are between 70 and 79, there are 73 people or 1.8% who are between 80 and 89, and there are 8 people or 0.2% who are 90 and older.

As of 2000 the average number of residents per living room was 0.56 which is about equal to the cantonal average of 0.57 per room. In this case, a room is defined as space of a housing unit of at least 4 m^{2} (43 sq ft) as normal bedrooms, dining rooms, living rooms, kitchens and habitable cellars and attics. About 38% of the total households were owner occupied, or in other words did not pay rent (though they may have a mortgage or a rent-to-own agreement).

As of 2000, there were 101 homes with 1 or 2 persons in the household, 709 homes with 3 or 4 persons in the household, and 496 homes with 5 or more persons in the household. The average number of people per household was 2.60 individuals. In 2008 there were 472 single family homes (or 27.7% of the total) out of a total of 1,702 homes and apartments. There were a total of 14 empty apartments for a 0.8% vacancy rate. As of 2007, the construction rate of new housing units was 4.4 new units per 1000 residents.

In the 2007 federal election the most popular party was the SVP which received 47.4% of the vote. The next three most popular parties were the SP (16.3%), the FDP (11.8%) and the CVP (9.1%).

The entire Swiss population is generally well educated. In Birr about 61.6% of the population (between age 25–64) have completed either non-mandatory upper secondary education or additional higher education (either university or a Fachhochschule). Of the school age population (in the 2008/2009 school year), there are 334 students attending primary school, there are 156 students attending secondary school in the municipality.

The historical population is given in the following table:

Historical population
Year	Pop.	±%
1850	498	—
1900	448	−10.0%
1950	562	+25.4%
1975	2,749	+389.1%
1980	2,838	+3.2%
1990	3,324	+17.1%
2000	3,529	+6.2%

== Heritage sites of national significance ==
The grave site of Heinrich Pestalozzi, at Pestalozzistrasse 2 is listed as a Swiss heritage site of national significance.

== Economy ==
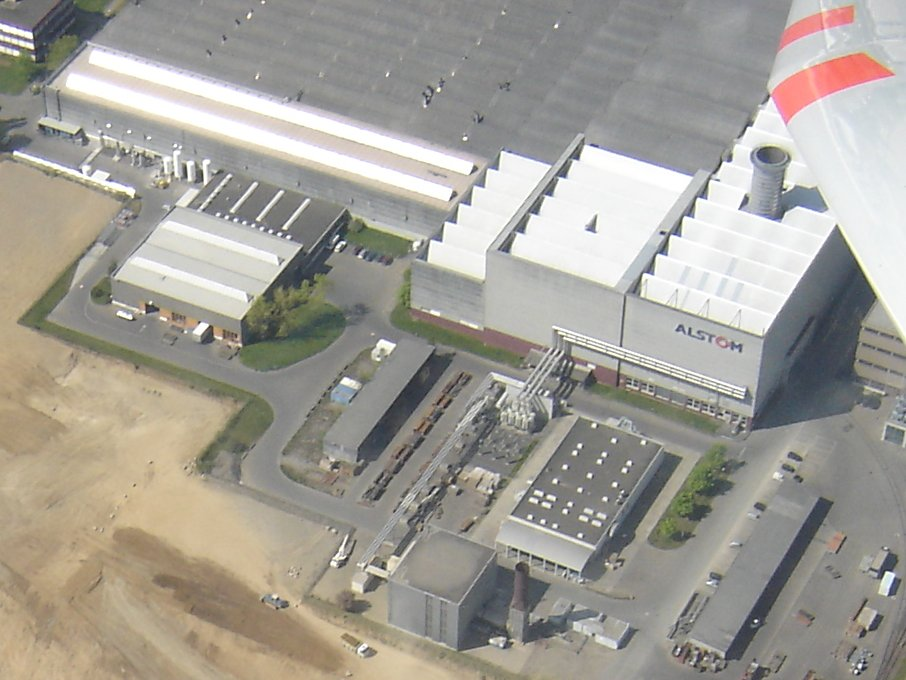
GE factory in Birr

As of 2007, Birr had an unemployment rate of 2.84%. As of 2005, there were 23 people employed in the primary economic sector and about 6 businesses involved in this sector. 1,556 people are employed in the secondary sector and there are 25 businesses in this sector. 566 people are employed in the tertiary sector, with 58 businesses in this sector.

As of 2000 there was a total of 1,859 workers who lived in the municipality. Of these, 1,407 or about 75.7% of the residents worked outside Birr while 1,722 people commuted into the municipality for work. There were a total of 2,174 jobs (of at least 6 hours per week) in the municipality. Of the working population, 11% used public transportation to get to work, and 49.6% used a private car.

Birr's economy is dependent mainly on industry: among other businesses, ABB, GE and IC Interconnex can be found here. The regional airfield Birrfeld (Sport flying) with its restaurant and playarea is a popular destination.

== Religion ==
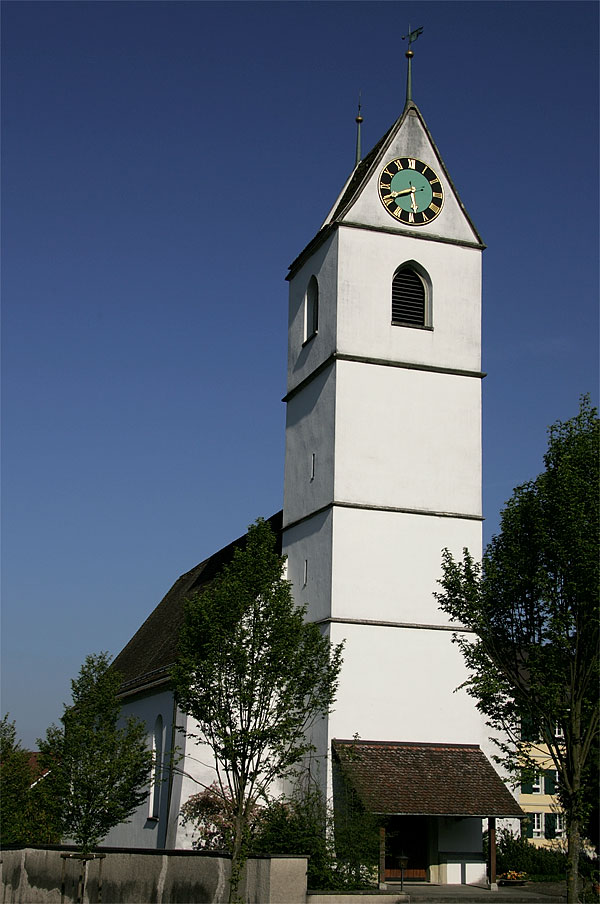
Church of Birr

From the 2000 census, 1,243 or 35.2% were Roman Catholic, while 1,047 or 29.7% belonged to the Swiss Reformed Church. Of the rest of the population, there was 1 individual who belonged to the Christian Catholic faith.
