= Neuhof (Switzerland) =

Swiss agricultural domain and educational institution in Birr, Aargau

- Agricultural domain and educational institution
- Country: Switzerland
- Canton: Aargau
- Municipality: Birr
- Founded: 1771
- Poorhouse: 1774–1780
- Reform school: 1914–present

Area
  - Total: 36 ha (89 acres)

Neuhof is an agricultural domain located in the municipality of Birr in the Swiss canton of Aargau. The estate has operated as a reform school since 1914, with a capacity of 40 students. The property is historically significant as the site that the educational reformer Johann Heinrich Pestalozzi established his first educational institute and wrote several of his major works.

== Early history and Pestalozzi's experiment ==
Around 1770, Johann Heinrich Pestalozzi and his wife, Anna Pestalozzi-Schulthess, a young couple from Zurich, acquired a 36-hectare plot of land at the northern foot of the Kestenberg to establish a model farm. The enterprise was largely financed by Pestalozzi-Schulthess's dowry. In 1771, the couple and their son Hans Jacob, born in 1770, moved to the Neuhof, which consisted of an imposing rural house and a barn. The location, not far from Schinznach-Bad, where the Helvetic Society met, had been carefully chosen.

Pestalozzi envisioned achieving financial independence through a farm operated according to agricultural reform ideas, cultivating new fodder plants and experimenting with new cultivation methods. However, from the second year onward, the establishment encountered financial difficulties. Pestalozzi, who had completed only one year of agricultural apprenticeship under the physiocrat Johann Rudolf Tschiffeli, was not capable of managing his own farm.

Subsequently, the couple established an educational institute for the poor in which from 1774, three dozen children lived and worked in a family atmosphere according to enlightened educational principles. Anna Pestalozzi-Schulthess took care of household maintenance, finances and the instruction of young girls. Despite those efforts, the lack of organization led to the Neuhofs' bankruptcy in 1780. The children were then employed by Christian Friedrich Laué in his calico printing factory.

== Literary period ==
From a literary perspective, Pestalozzi experienced a fruitful period at the Neuhof. Inspired by the writings of Jean-Jacques Rousseau, he wrote Abendstunde eines Einsiedlers ("Evening Hour of a Hermit", 1780), as well as the moral novel Leonard and Gertrude (4 volumes, 1781-1787; French translations 1783, 1827, 1947-1948), which essentially recounts the story of a village in the Birrfeld. After the publication of Meine Nachforschungen über den Gang der Natur in der Entwicklung des Menschengeschlechts ("My Researches on the Course of Nature in the Development of the Human Race", 1797, French translation 1994), the family left the estate.

In 1825, ten years after his wife's death, the aged Pestalozzi returned to the Neuhof, which he endeavoured to restore until his death in 1827. His grandson, Gottlieb Pestalozzi, had the new manor house, Herrenhaus, completed, the construction of which had begun in 1821-1822.

== Transformation into reform school ==
After eight changes of ownership and the fire that destroyed Pestalozzi's house, Pächterhaus, in 1858, a consortium took over the dilapidated Neuhof estate in 1909 and created a foundation. Among the co-initiators were political figures amd s representatives of the Swiss Society for Public Utility, cantonal public instruction directorates, and the Swiss Teachers' Association, including Ernst Laur and Friedrich Zollinger.

In 1914, the foundation inaugurated the Schweizerisches Pestalozziheim (Swiss Pestalozzi Home), a home that offered learning, development, and work opportunities to more than 70 young boys. The boys were mainly from disadvantaged backgrounds and were placed there by social assistance and institutions responsible for orphans and the poor. The Neuhof resumed lease operations in 1915, thus expanding and evolving work and training opportunities over time.

=== Educational programs and activities ===
The young boys were primarily trained in agricultural and culinary trades, horticulture (nursery from 1916), and, according to their educational objectives, in shoemaking (closed in 1965), sewing (1923-1978), carpentry (from 1927, also including timber framing from 1986), locksmithing (from 1953), or metalworking and painting workshops (1986). Classes were taught internally in the home's classrooms and in its own vocational school.

A pedagogical reorientation from the 1990s onward and adjustments to reception and care structures led to the construction of new housing units in 2004-2006. Since then, the Neuhof has been able to accommodate about forty young people.

== Bibliography ==
- Stadler, Peter: Pestalozzi – geschichtliche Biographien, vol. 1, 1988, pp. 131-178, 345-348; vol. 2, 1993, pp. 113-114.
- Ammann, Georges; Kobelt, Adrian; Musy, Gilbert: Auf den Spuren Pestalozzis. Stationen seines Lebens: Zürich, Birr, Stans, Burgdorf, Yverdon, 1996, pp. 39-67.
- Bugnard, Pierre-Philippe; Martin, Pierre-G. et al.: Ecrits sur l'expérience du Neuhof / Johann Heinrich Pestalozzi, 2001.
- Baumann, Max: Mülligen. Geschichte eines Dorfes an der Reuss, 2005, pp. 32-33.
- Brühlmeier, Arthur: War Pestalozzi ein Ausbeuter? Pestalozzi, die Indienne Druckerei Laué und die Kinderarbeit. Eine Auseinandersetzung mit dem Pestalozzi-Biografen Peter Stadler anhand einer Analyse der Briefe Pestalozzis an C.F. Laué unter besonderer Berücksichtigung des Briefes vom 22. Juli 1785, 2005.
- Brodbeck, Thomas; Hagen, Alejandro; Schüpbach, Andrea: Nach der Lehre kann ich gehen, dann ist alles gut. Die Geschichte des Berufsbildungsheims Neuhof in Birr (AG), vormals Schweizerisches Pestalozziheim Neuhof (1914-2014), 2014.
