= Mülligen =

- Municipality
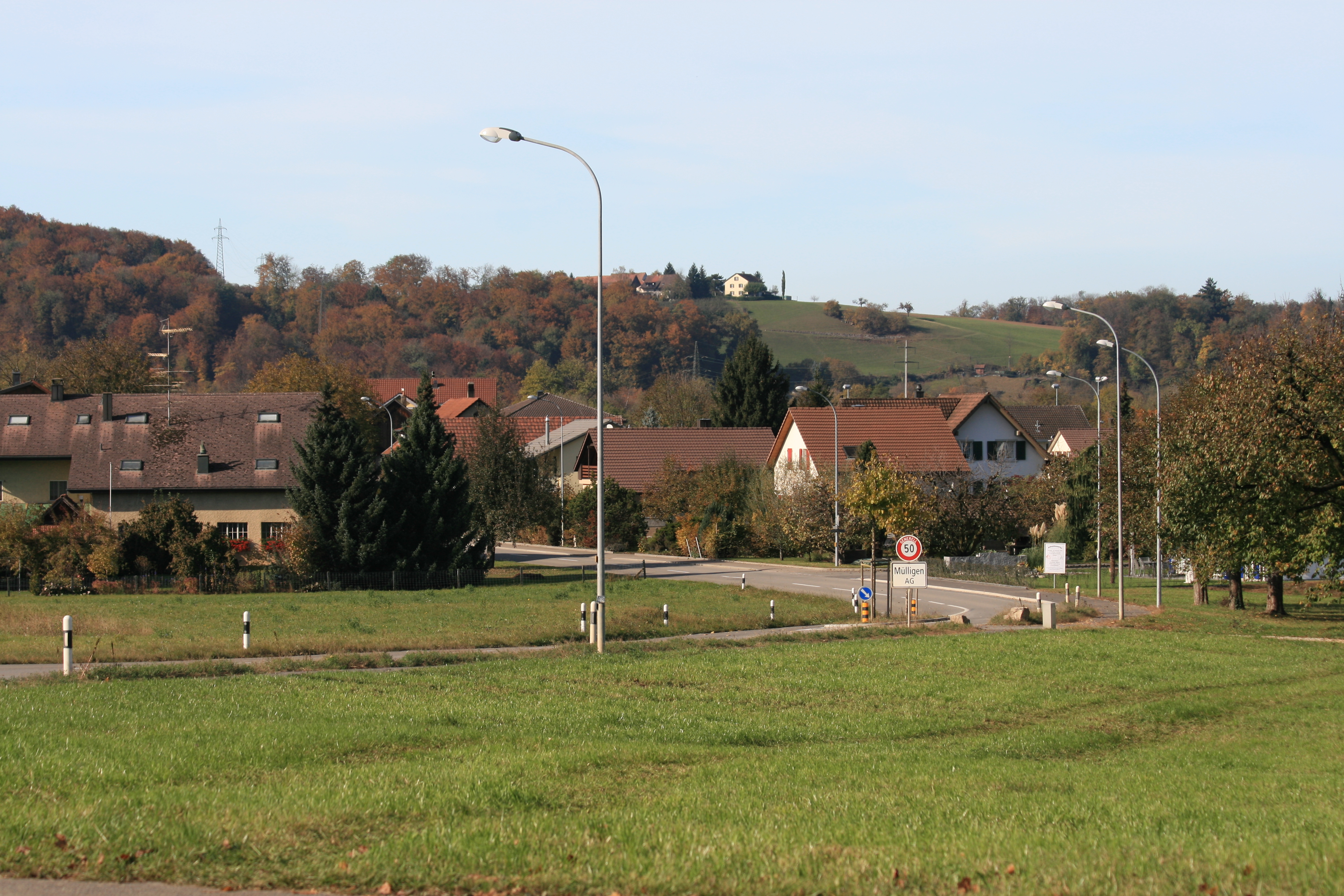

- Flag Coat of arms
- Location of Mülligen
- Location within Switzerland Location within Canton of Aargau
- Coordinates: 47°28′N 8°14′E
- Country: Switzerland
- Canton: Aargau
- District: Brugg

Area
  - Total: 3.16 km^{2} (1.22 sq mi)
- Elevation: 363 m (1,191 ft)

Population (December 2020)
  - Total: 1,074
  - Density: 340/km^{2} (880/sq mi)
- Time zone: UTC+01:00 (CET)
  - Summer (DST): UTC+02:00 (CEST)
- Postal code: 5243
- SFOS number: 4107
- ISO 3166 code: CH-AG
- Surrounded by: Birmenstorf, Birr, Hausen, Lupfig, Windisch
- Website: muelligen.ch

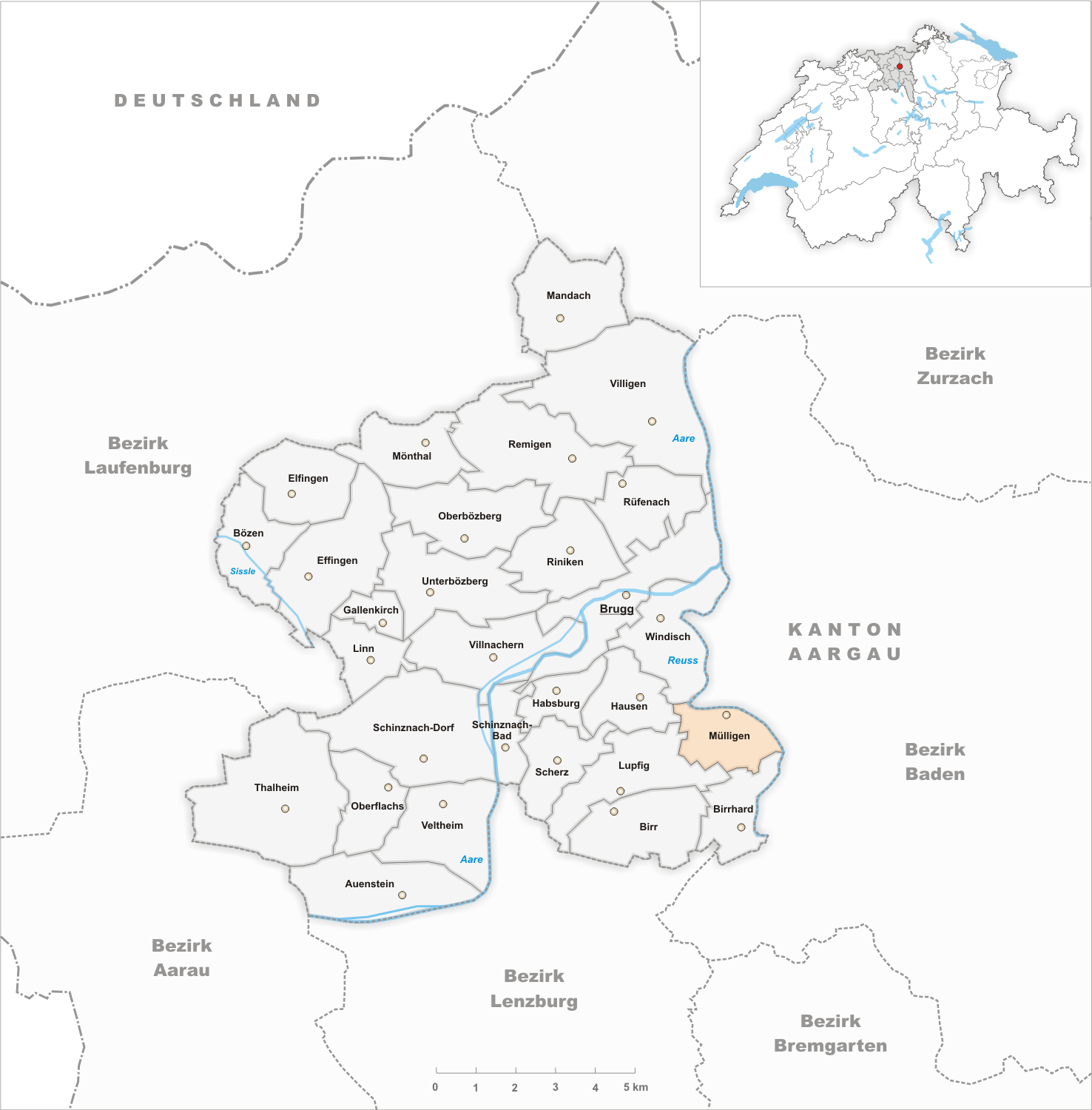
Mülligen

Mülligen is a municipality in the district of Brugg in canton of Aargau in Switzerland.

== History ==
Aerial view (1964)

The earliest known settlement was in the Early Middle Ages, though the only traces of the settlement are two groups of graves. Mülligen is first mentioned in the 12th century as Mülinon. Until the 17th century it was known as Mülinen.

The rights to high and low justice were held by the Habsburgs through Königsfelden Abbey. After the secularization of the abbey, those rights were held by Bern.

Originally the major economic activity in Mülligen was agriculture and viticulture. After 1730, small scale textile production provided another source of income. Then in 1849 a Gypsum processing plant opened in the village. Starting about 1830, the residents of Mülligen worked in the spinning mill in Windisch, and the first industrial plant in Mülligen opened in 1909. In 1924, a gravel plant opened in the village, and it was expanded in 1955. In 1964 the bovine artificial insemination center of the Swiss Association for Artificial Insemination opened.

The passenger ferry on the river Reuss was replaced in 1940 by a bridge. Benefiting from the village's proximity to the junction of the A1 and A3 motorways, A1-A3, Mülligen has become a residential village with many commuters to Brugg, Baden and Zurich.

== Geography ==
Mülligen has an area, as of 2009, of 3.16 square kilometers (1.22 sq mi). Of this area, 1.16 square kilometers (0.45 sq mi) or 36.7% is used for agricultural purposes, while 1.01 square kilometers (0.39 sq mi) or 32.0% is forested. Of the rest of the land, 0.89 square kilometers (0.34 sq mi) or 28.2% is settled (buildings or roads), 0.08 km^{2} (20 acres) or 2.5% is either rivers or lakes and 0.01 km^{2} (2.5 acres) or 0.3% is unproductive land.

Of the built up area, housing and buildings made up 6.0% and transportation infrastructure made up 11.4%. Power and water infrastructure as well as other special developed areas made up 9.8% of the area 31.0% of the total land area is heavily forested. Of the agricultural land, 24.7% is used for growing crops and 10.4% is pastures, while 1.6% is used for orchards or vine crops. All the water in the municipality is in rivers and streams.

The municipality is located in the Brugg district, near the Reuss river and along the southern slope of the Eiteberg. It consists of the village of Mülligen and the hamlets of Trotte.

== Coat of arms ==
The blazon of the municipal coat of arms is Or a Mill Wheel Sable and Coupeaux. The coat of arms of Mülligen is an example of canting because of the mill wheel (German: Mühlrad).

== Demographics ==
Mülligen has a population (as of December 2020) of 1,074 As of June 2009, 12.7% of the population are foreign nationals. Over the last 10 years (1997–2007) the population has changed at a rate of 17.3%. Most of the population (as of 2000) speaks German (94.9%), with French being second most common ( 1.3%) and Italian being third ( 1.0%).

The age distribution, as of 2008, in Mülligen is; 91 children or 9.8% of the population are between 0 and 9 years old and 121 teenagers or 13.0% are between 10 and 19. Of the adult population, 137 people or 14.7% of the population are between 20 and 29 years old. 132 people or 14.2% are between 30 and 39, 159 people or 17.1% are between 40 and 49, and 151 people or 16.2% are between 50 and 59. The senior population distribution is 93 people or 10.0% of the population are between 60 and 69 years old, 29 people or 3.1% are between 70 and 79, there are 19 people or 2.0% who are between 80 and 89.

As of 2000 the average number of residents per living room was 0.59 which is about equal to the cantonal average of 0.57 per room. In this case, a room is defined as space of a housing unit of at least 4 m^{2} (43 sq ft) as normal bedrooms, dining rooms, living rooms, kitchens and habitable cellars and attics.

About 54.7% of the total households were owner occupied, or in other words did not pay rent (though they may have a mortgage or a rent-to-own agreement). As of 2000, there were 26 homes with 1 or 2 persons in the household, 138 homes with 3 or 4 persons in the household, and 134 homes with 5 or more persons in the household. The average number of people per household was 2.57 individuals. In 2008 there were 152 single family homes (or 38.7% of the total) out of a total of 393 homes and apartments. There were a total of 5 empty apartments for a 1.3% vacancy rate. As of 2007, the construction rate of new housing units was 4.4 new units per 1000 residents.

In the 2007 federal election the most popular party was the SVP which received 40.9% of the vote. The next three most popular parties were the SP (25%), the Green Party (9.6%) and the FDP (7.6%).

In Mülligen about 85.7% of the population (between age 25 and 64) have completed either non-mandatory upper secondary education or additional higher education (either university or a Fachhochschule). Of the school age population (in the 2008/2009 school year), there are 55 students attending primary school in the municipality.

The historical population is given in the following table:

Historical population
Year	Pop.	±%
1764	151	—
1803	320	+111.9%
1850	397	+24.1%
1900	374	−5.8%
1950	377	+0.8%
2000	780	+106.9%

== Economy ==
As of 2007, Mülligen had an unemployment rate of 1.44%. As of 2005, there were 36 people employed in the primary economic sector and about 8 businesses involved in this sector. 34 people are employed in the secondary sector and there are 9 businesses in this sector. 44 people are employed in the tertiary sector, with 16 businesses in this sector.

As of 2000 there was a total of 460 workers who lived in the municipality. Of these, 383 or about 83.3% of the residents worked outside Mülligen while 106 people commuted into the municipality for work. There were a total of 183 jobs (of at least 6 hours per week) in the municipality. Of the working population, 13.6% used public transportation to get to work, and 59.7% used a private car.

== Religion ==
From the 2000 census, 271 or 34.7% were Roman Catholic, while 411 or 52.7% belonged to the Swiss Reformed Church. Of the rest of the population, there were 2 individuals (or about 0.26% of the population) who belonged to the Christian Catholic faith.

== Weather ==
Mülligen has an average of 133.5 days of rain or snow per year and on average receives 1,036 mm (40.8 in) of precipitation. The wettest month is August during which time Mülligen receives an average of 113 mm (4.4 in) of rain or snow. During this month there is precipitation for an average of 11.7 days. The month with the most days of precipitation is May, with an average of 13, but with only 96 mm (3.8 in) of rain or snow. The driest month of the year is October with an average of 70 mm (2.8 in) of precipitation over 11.7 days.
