= Hausen AG =

Hausen bei Brugg
- Municipality
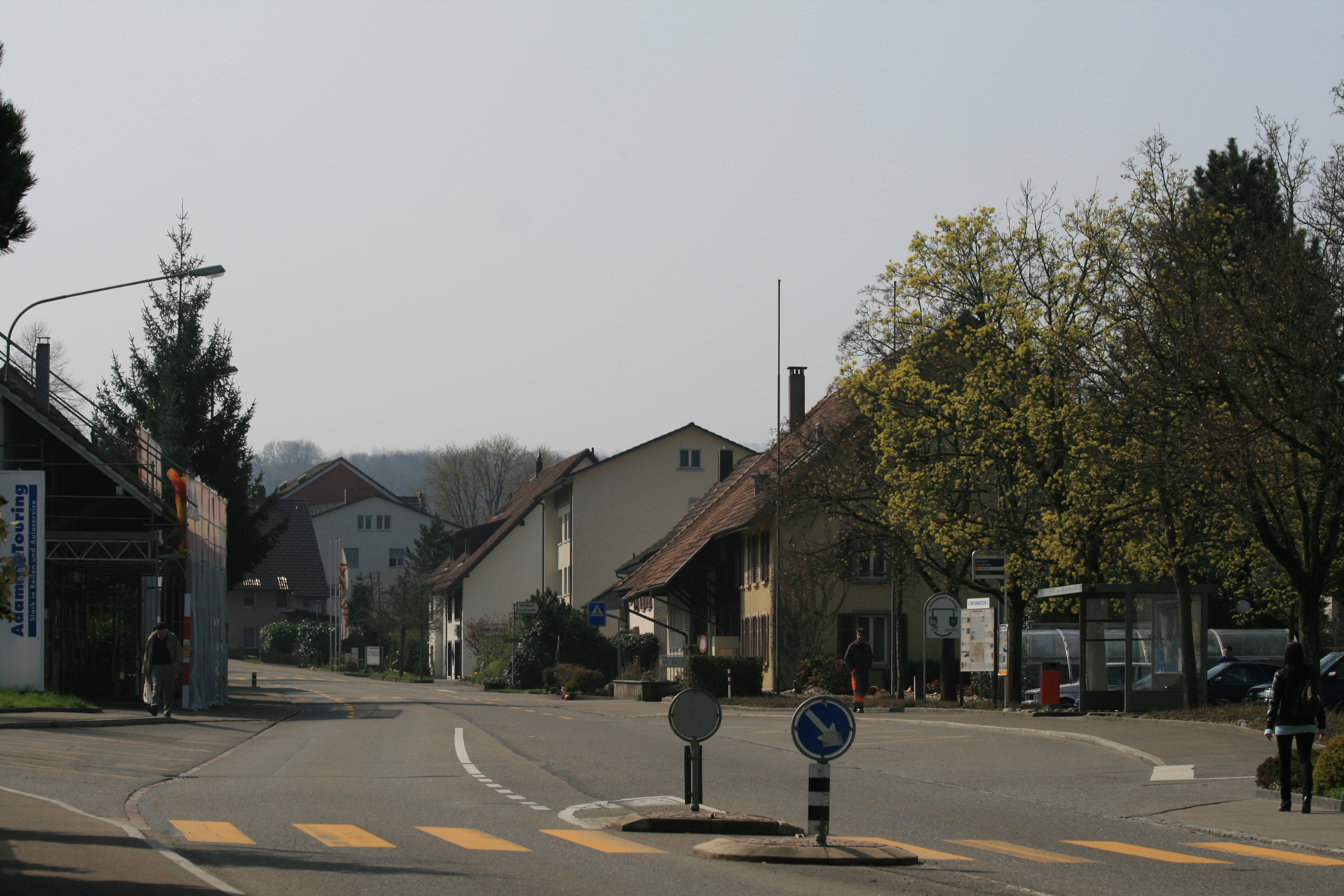

- Flag Coat of arms
- Location of Hausen bei Brugg
- Location within Switzerland Location within Canton of Aargau
- Coordinates: 47°28′N 8°13′E
- Country: Switzerland
- Canton: Aargau
- District: Brugg

Area
  - Total: 3.21 km^{2} (1.24 sq mi)
- Elevation: 380 m (1,250 ft)

Population (December 2020)
  - Total: 3,734
  - Density: 1,160/km^{2} (3,010/sq mi)
- Time zone: UTC+01:00 (CET)
  - Summer (DST): UTC+02:00 (CEST)
- Postal code: 5212
- SFOS number: 4100
- ISO 3166 code: CH-AG
- Surrounded by: Brugg, Habsburg, Lupfig, Mülligen, Scherz, Windisch
- Twin towns: Hausen im Wiesental (Germany)
- Website: hausen.swiss

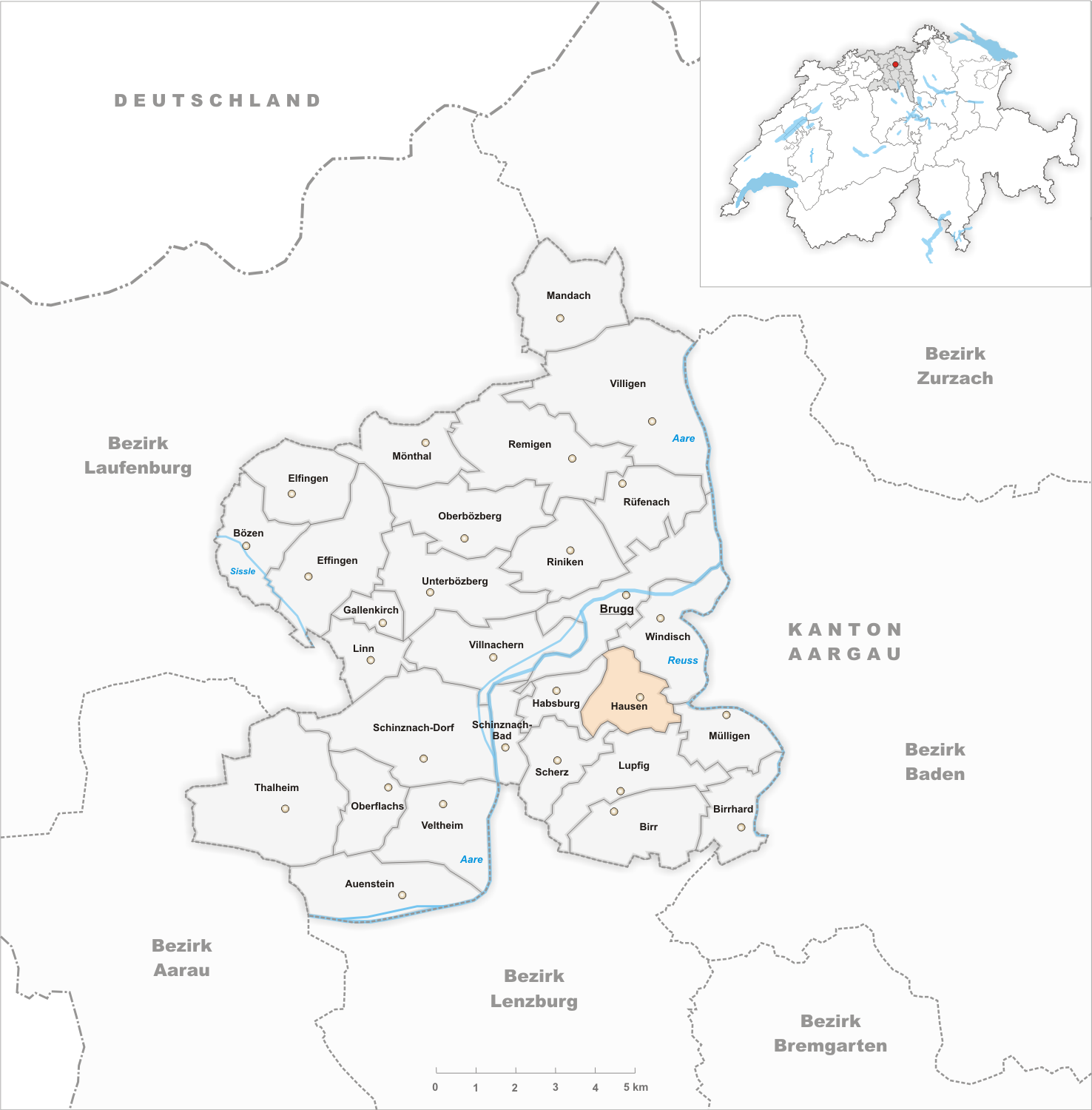
Hausen bei Brugg

Hausen (prior to 2003: Hausen bei Brugg) is a municipality in the district of Brugg in canton of Aargau in Switzerland.

Aerial view (1964)

== History ==
Iron Age graves near Hausen indicate that the area has a long history. The current village is built over a Roman era town, of which the remains of buildings, roads and water lines (including one that is still in operation) are still visible. Modern Hausen is first mentioned in 1254 as Husen. Hausen was part of the original Habsburg lands (German: Eigenamt).

Religiously it was part of the parish of Windisch until 1978 when the village built its own Reformed Church.

Economically, agriculture (especially vineyards) dominated. Though since the 18th Century, the textile industry has also been important in the village. During the Middle Ages limestone was quarried and in the 2nd half of the 19th Century clay was mined.

A bus service to Hausen has existed since 1955. After about 1950 the a strong housing industry led to population growth. With the growth, the infrastructure of the village was expanded. At the end of the 20th Century, transportation was a major source of conflict between the municipality and the canton.

== Geography ==
Hausen has an area, as of 2009, of 3.21 square kilometers (1.24 sq mi). Of this area, 0.7 square kilometers (0.27 sq mi) or 21.8% is used for agricultural purposes, while 1.52 square kilometers (0.59 sq mi) or 47.4% is forested. Of the rest of the land, 0.95 square kilometers (0.37 sq mi) or 29.6% is settled (buildings or roads) and 0.01 km^{2} (2.5 acres) or 0.3% is either rivers or lakes.

Of the built up area, industrial buildings made up 1.6% of the total area while housing and buildings made up 17.4% and transportation infrastructure made up 8.4%, while parks, green belts and sports fields made up 1.2%. 47.0% of the total land area is heavily forested. Of the agricultural land, 13.1% is used for growing crops and 7.5% is pastures, while 1.2% is used for orchards or vine crops. All the water in the municipality is in rivers and streams.

The municipality is located in the Brugg district. It consists of the former linear village of Hausen bei Brugg.

== Coat of arms ==
The blazon of the municipal coat of arms is Azure on a Base Vert a House Argent roofed Gules. This is an example of canting as the German word for House is Hausen.

== Demographics ==
Hausen has a population (as of December 2020) of 3,734. As of June 2009, 20.3% of the population are foreign nationals. Over the last 10 years (1997–2007) the population has changed at a rate of 15.3%. Most of the population (as of 2000) speaks German (85.6%), with Italian being second most common ( 3.9%) and Albanian being third ( 2.5%).

The age distribution, as of 2008, in Hausen is; 257 children or 8.9% of the population are between 0 and 9 years old and 343 teenagers or 11.9% are between 10 and 19. Of the adult population, 399 people or 13.8% of the population are between 20 and 29 years old. 378 people or 13.1% are between 30 and 39, 491 people or 17.0% are between 40 and 49, and 374 people or 13.0% are between 50 and 59. The senior population distribution is 343 people or 11.9% of the population are between 60 and 69 years old, 224 people or 7.8% are between 70 and 79, there are 61 people or 2.1% who are between 80 and 89, and there are 11 people or 0.4% who are 90 and older.

As of 2000 the average number of residents per living room was 0.56 which is about equal to the cantonal average of 0.57 per room. In this case, a room is defined as space of a housing unit of at least 4 m^{2} (43 sq ft) as normal bedrooms, dining rooms, living rooms, kitchens and habitable cellars and attics.

About 55.2% of the total households were owner occupied, or in other words did not pay rent (though they may have a mortgage or a rent-to-own agreement). As of 2000, there were 116 homes with 1 or 2 persons in the household, 468 homes with 3 or 4 persons in the household, and 439 homes with 5 or more persons in the household. The average number of people per household was 2.43 individuals. In 2008 there were 508 single family homes (or 39.7% of the total) out of a total of 1,278 homes and apartments. There were a total of 43 empty apartments for a 3.4% vacancy rate. As of 2007, the construction rate of new housing units was 11.5 new units per 1000 residents.

In the 2007 federal election the most popular party was the SVP which received 39.5% of the vote. The next three most popular parties were the FDP (15.9%), the SP (14.9%) and the CVP (11.9%).

The entire Swiss population is generally well educated. In Hausen about 75.1% of the population (between age 25–64) have completed either non-mandatory upper secondary education or additional higher education (either university or a Fachhochschule). Of the school age population (in the 2008/2009 school year), there are 206 students attending primary school in the municipality.

The historical population is given in the following table:

Historical population
| Year | Pop. | ±% |
|---|---|---|
| 1764 | 246 | — |
| 1850 | 576 | +134.1% |
| 1900 | 540 | −6.2% |
| 1950 | 926 | +71.5% |
| 1975 | 1,517 | +63.8% |
| 1980 | 1,618 | +6.7% |
| 1990 | 1,900 | +17.4% |
| 2000 | 2,603 | +37.0% |

== Economy ==
As of 2007, Hausen had an unemployment rate of 2.1%. As of 2005, there were 8 people employed in the primary economic sector and about 4 businesses involved in this sector. 138 people are employed in the secondary sector and there are 19 businesses in this sector. 913 people are employed in the tertiary sector, with 86 businesses in this sector.

As of 2000 there was a total of 1,426 workers who lived in the municipality. Of these, 1,225 or about 85.9% of the residents worked outside Hausen while 367 people commuted into the municipality for work. There were a total of 568 jobs (of at least 6 hours per week) in the municipality. Of the working population, 18.6% used public transportation to get to work, and 51.2% used a private car.

== Religion ==
From the 2000 census, 954 or 36.7% were Roman Catholic, while 1,107 or 42.5% belonged to the Swiss Reformed Church. Of the rest of the population, there were 6 individuals (or about 0.23% of the population) who belonged to the Christian Catholic faith.
