= Lupfig =

- Municipality
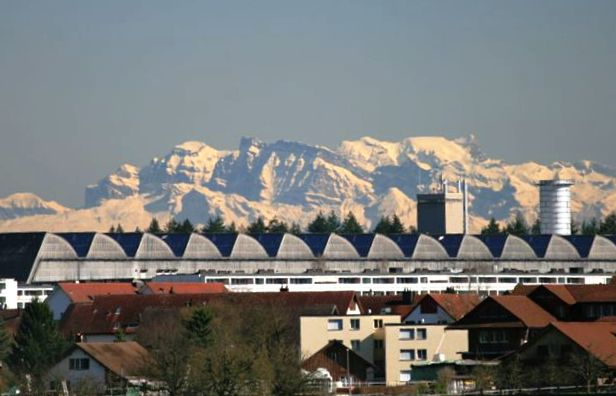

- Flag Coat of arms
- Location of Lupfig
- Location within Switzerland Location within Canton of Aargau
- Coordinates: 47°27′N 8°12′E
- Country: Switzerland
- Canton: Aargau
- District: Brugg

Area
  - Total: 5.15 km^{2} (1.99 sq mi)
- Elevation: 399 m (1,309 ft)

Population (December 2020)
  - Total: 12,679
  - Density: 2,460/km^{2} (6,380/sq mi)
- Time zone: UTC+01:00 (CET)
  - Summer (DST): UTC+02:00 (CEST)
- Postal code: 5242
- SFOS number: 4104
- ISO 3166 code: CH-AG
- Surrounded by: Birr, Birrhard, Hausen, Holderbank, Möriken-Wildegg, Mülligen, Scherz
- Website: lupfig.ch

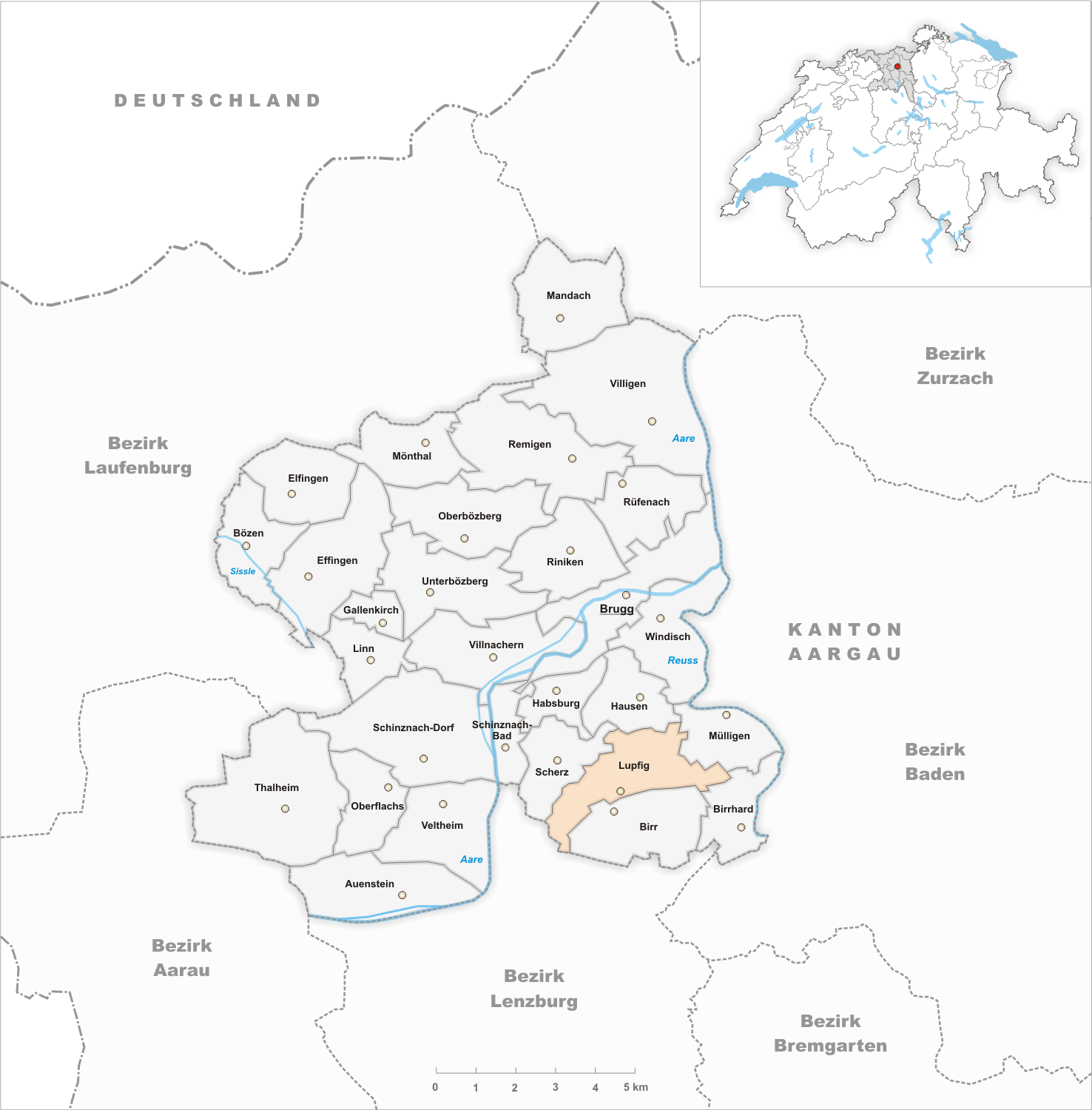
Lupfig

Lupfig is a municipality in the district of Brugg in canton of Aargau in Switzerland. On 1 January 2018 the former municipality of Scherz merged into the municipality of Lupfig.

== History ==
Near the modern village of Lupfig was the source of a Roman aqueduct leading to the camp of Vindonissa. Additionally, Alamanni graves have been discovered near the village. The modern village of Lupfig is first mentioned about 1273 as Lupfanch.

The village was part of the Habsburgs core possessions (German: Eigenamt) and is near Habsburg Castle. In the 14th century, the rights to the low justice and property in the village went to Königsfelden Abbey. When the abbey was dissolved, the property went to the city of Bern. The municipality has owned a tavern since at least 1628.

Until 1526 it was part of the Windisch parish, then it went to the Birr parish and in 1715 Lupfig had its own parsonage. Since 1966 the village has had a Catholic chapel of ease.

While agriculture was the main economic force, starting in the middle 18th century home cotton production provided another source of income. In the 19th century two other industries came to Lupfig, straw goods manufacturing and stone cutting (from about 1880 until 1940) for the watch industry. In 1936, the regional airport was opened at Birrfeld. Due to good transportation links (A1 and A3 motorways and the Swiss Federal Railways Gotthard line) since the 1950s the village has become an industry and distribution center. In the 1980s new residential buildings were built in Lupfig to house the growing number of commuters.

== Geography ==
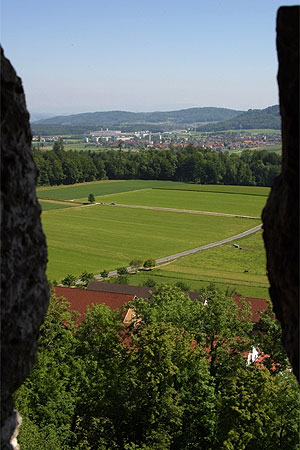
View of Lupfig from Habsburg Castle

Aerial view from 700 m by Walter Mittelholzer (1920)

Lupfig has an area, as of 2009, of 5.15 square kilometers (1.99 sq mi). Of this area, 2.52 square kilometers (0.97 sq mi) or 48.9% is used for agricultural purposes, while 1.22 square kilometers (0.47 sq mi) or 23.7% is forested. Of the rest of the land, 1.38 square kilometers (0.53 sq mi) or 26.8% is settled (buildings or roads), 0.02 km^{2} (4.9 acres) or 0.4% is either rivers or lakes.

Of the built up area, industrial buildings made up 6.0% of the total area while housing and buildings made up 8.7% and transportation infrastructure made up 10.9%. 22.9% of the total land area is heavily forested. Of the agricultural land, 34.6% is used for growing crops and 12.2% is pastures, while 2.1% is used for orchards or vine crops. All the water in the municipality is in rivers and streams.

The municipality is located in the Brugg district. It consists of the village of Lupfig which has grown together with Birr.

== Coat of arms ==
The blazon of the municipal coat of arms is Azure three Ears of wheat, the two outer leaved Or.

== Demographics ==
Lupfig has a population (as of December 2020) of 12,679. As of June 2009, 17.9% of the population are foreign nationals. Over the last 10 years (1997–2007) the population has changed at a rate of 31%. Most of the population (as of 2000) speaks German (89.4%), with Italian being second most common ( 3.5%) and Serbo-Croatian being third ( 1.3%).

The age distribution, as of 2008, in Lupfig is; 227 children or 10.9% of the population are between 0 and 9 years old and 222 teenagers or 10.7% are between 10 and 19. Of the adult population, 232 people or 11.2% of the population are between 20 and 29 years old. 305 people or 14.7% are between 30 and 39, 394 people or 18.9% are between 40 and 49, and 287 people or 13.8% are between 50 and 59. The senior population distribution is 223 people or 10.7% of the population are between 60 and 69 years old, 132 people or 6.3% are between 70 and 79, there are 48 people or 2.3% who are between 80 and 89, and there are 10 people or 0.5% who are 90 and older.

As of 2000 the average number of residents per living room was 0.58 which is about equal to the cantonal average of 0.57 per room. In this case, a room is defined as space of a housing unit of at least 4 m^{2} (43 sq ft) as normal bedrooms, dining rooms, living rooms, kitchens and habitable cellars and attics.

About 57.9% of the total households were owner occupied, or in other words did not pay rent (though they may have a mortgage or a rent-to-own agreement). As of 2000, there were 76 homes with 1 or 2 persons in the household, 465 homes with 3 or 4 persons in the household, and 189 homes with 5 or more persons in the household. The average number of people per household was 2.31 individuals. In 2008 there were 265 single family homes (or 27.9% of the total) out of a total of 950 homes and apartments. There were a total of 7 empty apartments for a 0.7% vacancy rate. As of 2007, the construction rate of new housing units was 19.2 new units per 1000 residents.

In the 2007 federal election the most popular party was the SVP which received 43.9% of the vote. The next three most popular parties were the SP (14.6%), the FDP (12.3%) and the CVP (10.3%).

The entire Swiss population is generally well educated. In Lupfig about 76.5% of the population (between age 25–64) have completed either non-mandatory upper secondary education or additional higher education (either university or a Fachhochschule). Of the school age population (in the 2008/2009 school year), there are 170 students attending primary school, there are 68 students attending secondary school in the municipality.

The historical population is given in the following table:

Historical population
| Year | Pop. | ±% |
|---|---|---|
| 1764 | 363 | — |
| 1850 | 736 | +102.8% |
| 1900 | 582 | −20.9% |
| 1950 | 637 | +9.5% |
| 1975 | 913 | +43.3% |
| 1980 | 963 | +5.5% |
| 1990 | 1,355 | +40.7% |
| 2000 | 1,819 | +34.2% |

== Economy ==
As of 2007, Lupfig had an unemployment rate of 1.59%. As of 2005, there were 53 people employed in the primary economic sector and about 12 businesses involved in this sector. 648 people are employed in the secondary sector and there are 30 businesses in this sector. 1,159 people are employed in the tertiary sector, with 93 businesses in this sector.

As of 2000 there was a total of 1,072 workers who lived in the municipality. Of these, 834 or about 77.8% of the residents worked outside Lupfig while 1,207 people commuted into the municipality for work. There were a total of 1,445 jobs (of at least 6 hours per week) in the municipality. Of the working population, 10.7% used public transportation to get to work, and 53.9% used a private car.

== Religion ==
From the 2000 census, 586 or 32.2% were Roman Catholic, while 893 or 49.1% belonged to the Swiss Reformed Church. Of the rest of the population, there were 5 individuals (or about 0.27% of the population) who belonged to the Christian Catholic faith.
