= Habsburg, Switzerland =

Habsburg
- Municipality
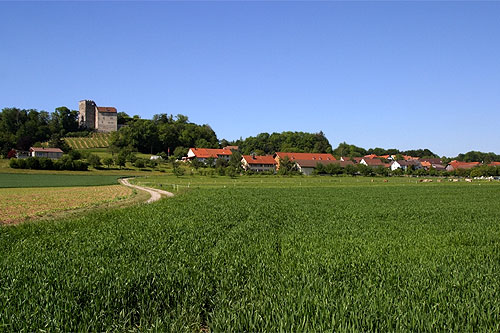
- Habsburg village

- Flag Coat of arms
- Location of Habsburg
- Location within Switzerland Location within Canton of Aargau
- Coordinates: 47°28′N 8°11′E
- Country: Switzerland
- Canton: Aargau
- District: Brugg

Area
  - Total: 2.23 km^{2} (0.86 sq mi)
- Elevation: 470 m (1,540 ft)

Population (December 2020)
  - Total: 428
  - Density: 192/km^{2} (497/sq mi)
- Time zone: UTC+01:00 (CET)
  - Summer (DST): UTC+02:00 (CEST)
- Postal code: 5245
- SFOS number: 4099
- ISO 3166 code: CH-AG
- Surrounded by: Brugg, Hausen, Scherz, Schinznach-Bad
- Website: habsburg.ch

Habsburg (Alemannic German: Hapschberg, lit. 'Hawk's Hill') is a municipality in the district of Brugg in canton of Aargau in Switzerland. It lies about three kilometres southwest of the town of Brugg, the capital of the district of Brugg. Habsburg is named after Habsburg Castle, built around 1020–1030 for Count Radbot of the nearby county of Klettgau in the Duchy of Swabia, which Habsburg was also a part of at the time.

Aerial view (1958)

== History ==
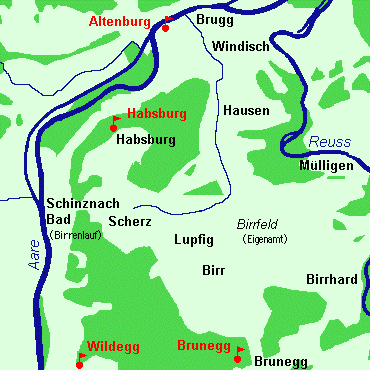
The Habsburg lands from the 11th to 13th Centuries

While Bronze Age and Roman era artifacts have been discovered, a village named Habsburg isn't mentioned until 1027, as Habesbur or Habeburch. This reference comes from a later (1114) copy of the original 1027 document. In 1114 it was mentioned Hauesborc.

The documentation of the village in 1027 is contemporary with Count Radbot's construction of Habsburg Castle. It is believed that they named the castle after a hawk (German: Habicht) seen sitting on its walls. Some historians and linguists believe the name may come from the Middle High German word 'hab / hap' meaning ford, as it is located near a ford of the Aar River. Habsburg Castle became the originating family seat of the House of Habsburg, which went on to become one of the leading royal dynasties in Europe.

Habsburg Castle remained the property of the House of Habsburg until 1415, when Duke Frederick IV of the Empty Pockets lost the canton of Aargau to the Swiss Confederacy.

The area around the Habsburg Castle and the modern municipality, was covered by forests that were only cleared around 1500, nearly half a millennium after Habsburg Castle was first constructed.

Religiously, it was always part of the parish of Windisch. The community grew slowly. In 1529 there were only four houses in the village, and the school was first built in 1747. The economy was almost exclusively agriculture (including a little viticulture) until 1800 when a small plaster industry came to the village. In 1818, the schoolhouse was built, while in 1896 a fire house and pond were added. The municipal water supply was built in 1908 and in 1916 the village was connected to the electric grid. By 1960 the population decreased due to lack of earning potential and from the remote location. But it grew again after 1971 when several new houses were built. Since 1984, there has been a Postauto bus to Habsburg.

== Geography ==
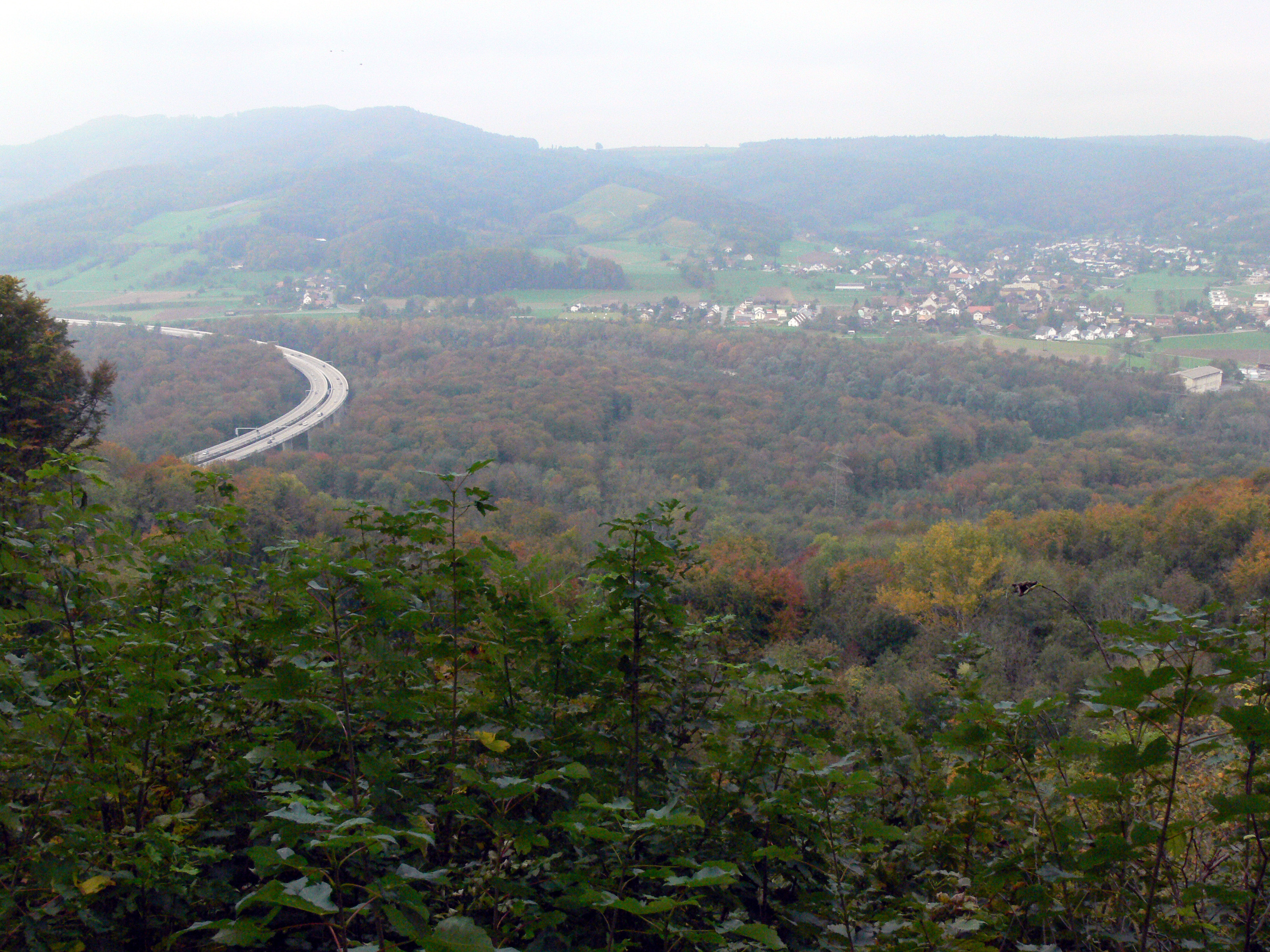
View from the Habsburg Castle to Bötzberg and the Swiss highway A3

Habsburg has an area, as of 2009, of 2.23 square kilometers (0.86 sq mi). Of this area, 0.67 square kilometers (0.26 sq mi) or 30.0% is used for agricultural purposes, while 1.36 square kilometers (0.53 sq mi) or 61.0% is forested. Of the rest of the land, 0.2 square kilometers (0.077 sq mi) or 9.0% is settled (buildings or roads).

Of the built up area, housing and buildings made up 5.8% and transportation infrastructure made up 2.7%. 61.0% of the total land area is heavily forested. Of the agricultural land, 25.6% is used for growing crops and 3.6% is pastures.

The municipality is located in the Brugg district. It consists of the haufendorf village (an irregular, unplanned and quite closely packed village, built around a central square) of Habsburg below Habsburg Castle. It is located above the Aare valley, directly east of the Wüpelsbergs, on which the castle is located.

== Coat of arms ==
The blazon of the municipal coat of arms is a depiction of Habsburg Castle, more specifically described as Azure on a Mount Vert a House Azure roofed Gules with a square Tower masoned Sable or Azure, on a Mount Vert the Habsburg Silver roofed Gules.

== Demographics ==
Habsburg has a population (as of December 2020) of 428. As of June 2009, 6.5% of the population are foreign nationals. Over the last 10 years (1997–2007) the population has changed at a rate of 6.8%. Most of the population (as of 2000) speaks German (96.7%), with Italian being second most common (1.4%) and French being third (1.1%).

The age distribution, as of 2008, in Habsburg is; 35 children or 8.2% of the population are between 0 and 9 years old and 54 teenagers or 12.6% are between 10 and 19. Of the adult population, 51 people or 11.9% of the population are between 20 and 29 years old. 55 people or 12.9% are between 30 and 39, 90 people or 21.1% are between 40 and 49, and 69 people or 16.2% are between 50 and 59. The senior population distribution is 37 people or 8.7% of the population are between 60 and 69 years old, 29 people or 6.8% are between 70 and 79, there are 5 people or 1.2% who are between 80 and 89, and there are 2 people or 0.5% who are 90 and older.

As of 2000 the average number of residents per living room was 0.54 which is about equal to the cantonal average of 0.57 per room. In this case, a room is defined as space of a housing unit of at least 4 m^{2} (43 sq ft) as normal bedrooms, dining rooms, living rooms, kitchens and habitable cellars and attics.

About 62.3% of the total households were owner occupied, or in other words did not pay rent (though they may have a mortgage or a rent-to-own agreement). As of 2000, there were 9 homes with 1 or 2 persons in the household, 50 homes with 3 or 4 persons in the household, and 79 homes with 5 or more persons in the household. The average number of people per household was 2.56 individuals. In 2008 there were 90 single family homes (or 52.6% of the total) out of a total of 171 homes and apartments. There were a total of 1 empty apartments for a 0.6% vacancy rate. As of 2007, the construction rate of new housing units was 2.4 new units per 1000 residents.

In the 2007 federal election the most popular party was the SVP which received 42.1% of the vote. The next three most popular parties were the FDP (13.7%), the SP (11.1%) and the Green Party (10%).

The entire Swiss population is generally well educated. In Habsburg about 88.1% of the population (between age 25–64) have completed either non-mandatory upper secondary education or additional higher education (either university or a Fachhochschule). Of the school age population (in the 2008/2009 school year), there are 20 students attending primary school in the municipality.

The historical population is given in the following table:

Historical population
Year	Pop.	±%
1798	98	—
1850	176	+79.6%
1900	144	−18.2%
1950	133	−7.6%
1960	126	−5.3%
1975	227	+80.2%
1980	254	+11.9%
1990	327	+28.7%
2000	368	+12.5%

== Heritage sites of national significance ==
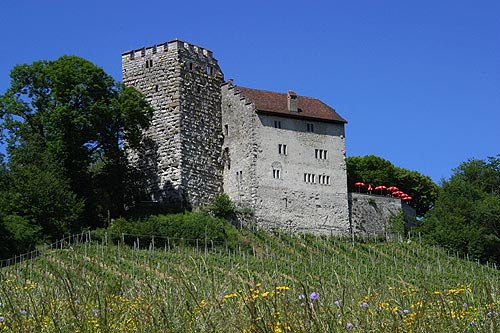
Habsburg castle

Habsburg Castle is listed as a Swiss heritage site of national significance.

== Economy ==
As of 2007, Habsburg had an unemployment rate of 1.44%. As of 2005, there were 13 people employed in the primary economic sector and about 3 businesses involved in this sector. 9 people are employed in the secondary sector and there are 3 businesses in this sector. 39 people are employed in the tertiary sector, with 9 businesses in this sector.

As of 2000 there was a total of 202 workers who lived in the municipality. Of these, 168 or about 83.2% of the residents worked outside Habsburg while 25 people commuted into the municipality for work. There were a total of 59 jobs (of at least 6 hours per week) in the municipality. Of the working population, 12.1% used public transportation to get to work, and 56.5% used a private car.

== Religion ==
From the 2000 census, 85 or 23.1% were Roman Catholic, while 220 or 59.8% belonged to the Swiss Reformed Church. Of the rest of the population, there were 2 individuals (or about 0.54% of the population) who belonged to the Christian Catholic faith.
