= Möriken-Wildegg =

- Municipality
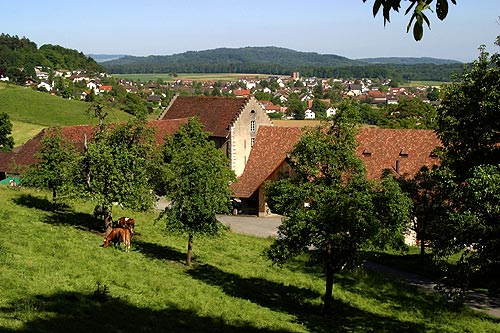

- Flag Coat of arms
- Location of Möriken-Wildegg
- Location within Switzerland Location within Canton of Aargau
- Coordinates: 47°25′N 8°11′E
- Country: Switzerland
- Canton: Aargau
- District: Lenzburg

Area
  - Total: 6.61 km^{2} (2.55 sq mi)
- Elevation: 387 m (1,270 ft)

Population (December 2006)
  - Total: 3,832
  - Density: 580/km^{2} (1,500/sq mi)
- Time zone: UTC+01:00 (CET)
  - Summer (DST): UTC+02:00 (CEST)
- Postal code: 5103
- SFOS number: 4203
- ISO 3166 code: CH-AG
- Surrounded by: Auenstein, Birr, Brunegg, Holderbank, Lenzburg, Lupfig, Niederlenz, Othmarsingen, Rupperswil, Veltheim
- Website: www.moeriken-wildegg.ch

Möriken-Wildegg is a municipality in the district of Lenzburg in the canton of Aargau in Switzerland.

== History ==
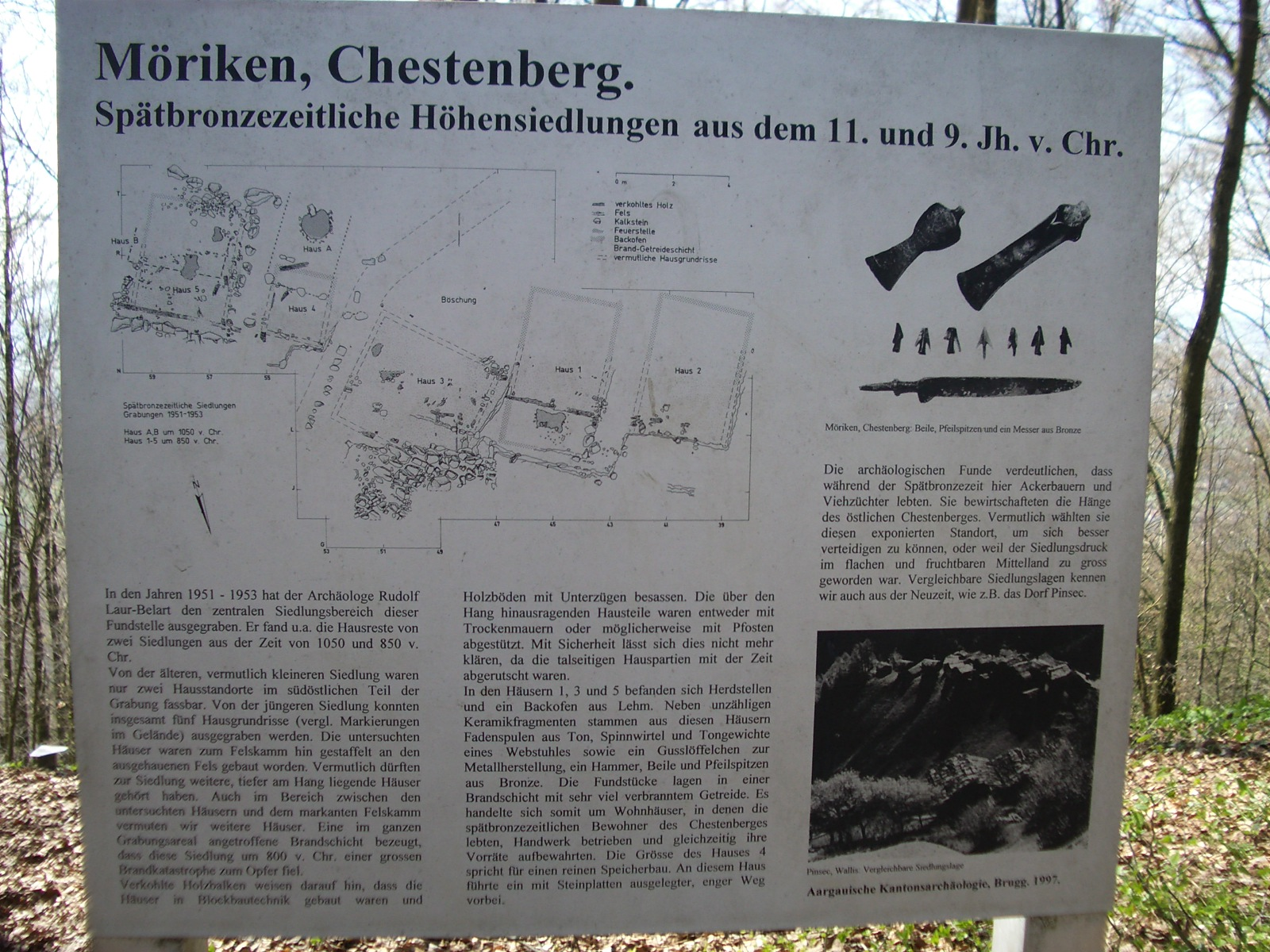
Reconstruction of the Late Bronze Age settlement at Kestenberg

Aerial view of Möriken (1962)

The area was settled in the Late Bronze Age. The hilltop settlement on the Kestenberg had at least two phases (approximately 1050 to 1000 BC and 850 BC.). In the more recent settlement, the buildings were built with logs and traces of constructions and traces of bronze casting were discovered. A Roman era wall at the Lehmgrube river indicates that there was a Roman farm in the area. Möriken-Wildegg is first mentioned in 1283 as de Moerinchon. In the High Middle Ages the village belonged to the Lords of Holderbank and then later to the Twingherrschaft of Wildegg.

Religiously, into the 16th century the inhabitants of Möriken-Wildegg belonged to the parish of Staufberg. In 1565 they became part of the Holderbank parish. A chapel dedicated to Saint Antonius was mentioned in the 13th century. It was demolished in 1949 and replaced by a new building. A temporary Catholic church was consecrated in 1951, and a new building was finished in 1967.

Economically, the village was dependent on agriculture and wine production. In the 17th century, a local noble family started a livestock operation. In the 18th century home cotton processing started in the village, and a cotton printing company was founded in 1775 by Johann Rudolf Dolder. However, this company collapsed in 1850. A cement factory was built in 1890, and in 1912 employed a maximum of 850 people. A copper wire factory (founded 1920) employed about 200 people in 1992.

An important factor to the growth of Möriken-Wildegg came in 1858 when a railroad station on the Aarau-Brugg line opened in the village. In 1895 it also connected to the Seetalbahn rail line. Though this connection was replaced with a bus service in 1984.

Starting in 1890 successful operettas were held in Möriken-Wildegg. In 1959, the town hall was built with 600 seats.

== Geography ==
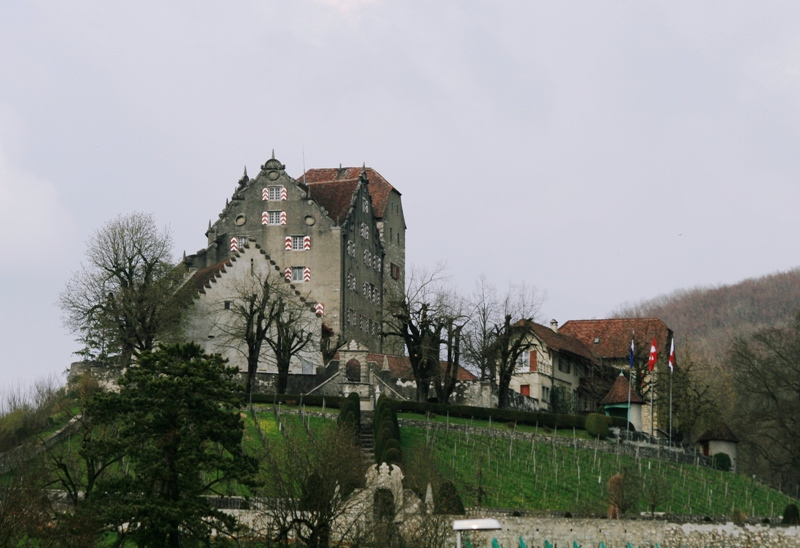
Wildegg Castle above the settlement of Wildegg

Möriken-Wildegg has an area, as of 2009, of 6.6 square kilometers (2.5 sq mi). Of this area, 2.48 km^{2} (0.96 sq mi) or 37.6% is used for agricultural purposes, while 2.32 km^{2} (0.90 sq mi) or 35.2% is forested. Of the rest of the land, 1.66 km^{2} (0.64 sq mi) or 25.2% is settled (buildings or roads), 0.12 km^{2} (30 acres) or 1.8% is either rivers or lakes and 0.02 km^{2} (4.9 acres) or 0.3% is unproductive land.

Of the built up area, industrial buildings made up 5.5% of the total area while housing and buildings made up 13.8% and transportation infrastructure made up 4.2%. Out of the forested land, 33.6% of the total land area is heavily forested and 1.5% is covered with orchards or small clusters of trees. Of the agricultural land, 28.0% is used for growing crops and 7.9% is pastures, while 1.7% is used for orchards or vine crops. All the water in the municipality is in rivers and streams.

The municipality is located in the Lenzburg district. It consists of the village of Möriken, Wildegg Castle, the village section of Wildegg (founded in the 18th century), the settlement of Hard and the ferry over the Aare river (replaced in 1870 by a bridge).

== Coat of arms ==
The blazon of the municipal coat of arms is Or Moor's Head guardant proper.

== Demographics ==
Möriken-Wildegg has a population (as of December 2020) of 4,561. As of June 2009, 19.2% of the population are foreign nationals. Over the last 10 years (1997–2007) the population has changed at a rate of 8.9%. Most of the population (as of 2000) speaks German (90.6%), with Italian being second most common ( 2.8%) and Serbo-Croatian being third ( 1.7%).

The age distribution, as of 2008, in Möriken-Wildegg is; 384 children or 9.7% of the population are between 0 and 9 years old and 486 teenagers or 12.2% are between 10 and 19. Of the adult population, 522 people or 13.1% of the population are between 20 and 29 years old. 493 people or 12.4% are between 30 and 39, 674 people or 17.0% are between 40 and 49, and 569 people or 14.3% are between 50 and 59. The senior population distribution is 420 people or 10.6% of the population are between 60 and 69 years old, 238 people or 6.0% are between 70 and 79, there are 164 people or 4.1% who are between 80 and 89, and there are 21 people or 0.5% who are 90 and older.

As of 2000 the average number of residents per living room was 0.54 which is about equal to the cantonal average of 0.57 per room. In this case, a room is defined as space of a housing unit of at least 4 m^{2} (43 sq ft) as normal bedrooms, dining rooms, living rooms, kitchens and habitable cellars and attics. About 59.6% of the total households were owner occupied, or in other words did not pay rent (though they may have a mortgage or a rent-to-own agreement).

As of 2000, there were 105 homes with 1 or 2 persons in the household, 623 homes with 3 or 4 persons in the household, and 607 homes with 5 or more persons in the household. As of 2000, there were 1,384 private households (homes and apartments) in the municipality, and an average of 2.4 persons per household. In 2008 there were 800 single family homes (or 44.9% of the total) out of a total of 1,780 homes and apartments. There were a total of 23 empty apartments for a 1.3% vacancy rate. As of 2007, the construction rate of new housing units was 17.3 new units per 1000 residents.

In the 2007 federal election the most popular party was the SVP which received 40.8% of the vote. The next three most popular parties were the SP (18.2%), the FDP (15.7%) and the CVP (6.7%).

The historical population is given in the following table:

Historical population
Year	Pop.	±%
1764	426	—
1850	821	+92.7%
1900	1,161	+41.4%
1950	2,134	+83.8%
2000	3,413	+59.9%

== Heritage sites of national significance ==
Wildegg Castle, the Kestenberg (a Bronze Age hilltop settlement), the Gasthof Bären at Bruggerstrasse 19, Wildegg's Catholic Church of St. Antonius and the houses at Effingerweg 5, 6, 8 are listed as Swiss heritage sites of national significance. The entire village of Wildegg is designated as part of the Inventory of Swiss Heritage Sites.

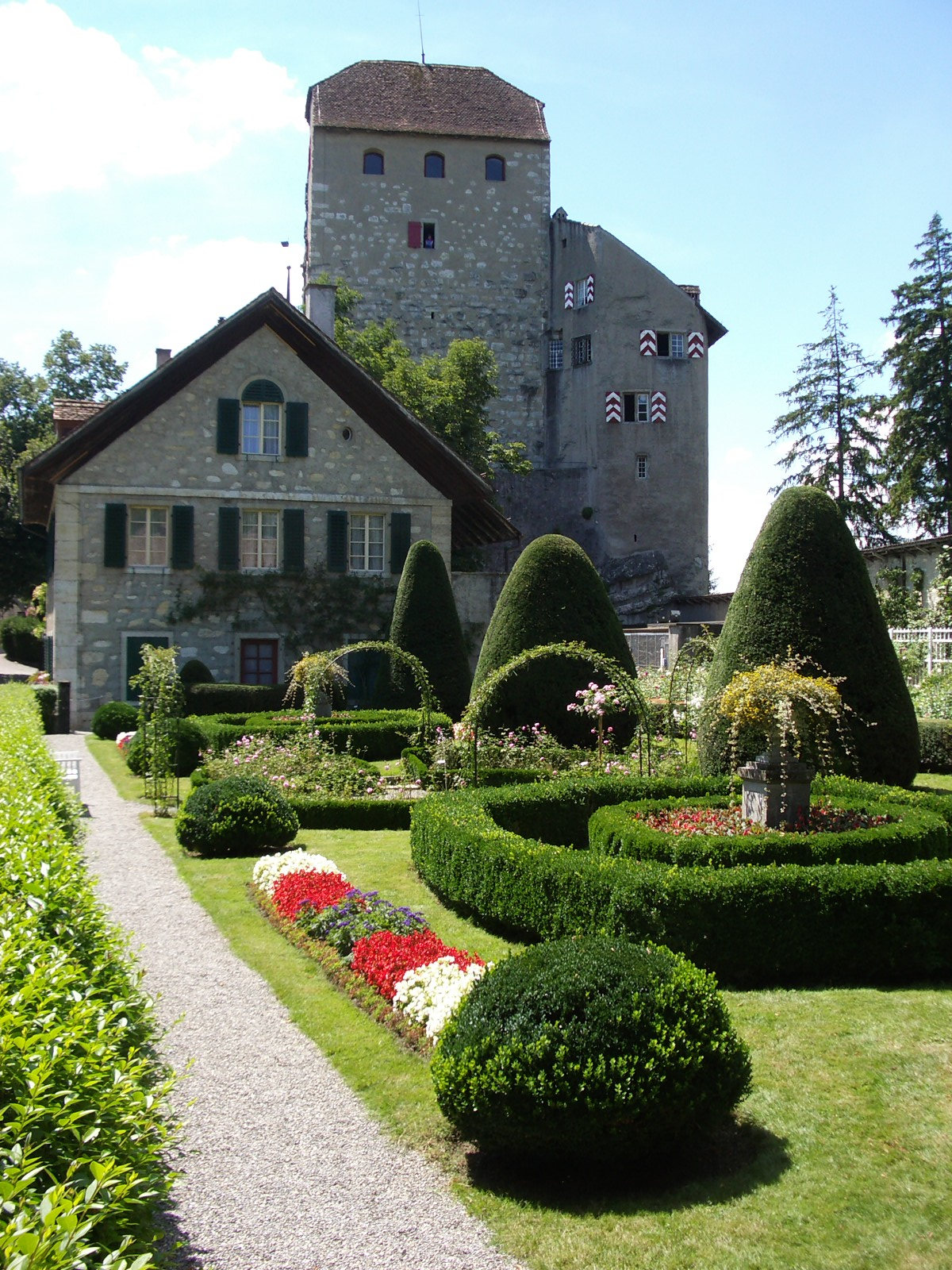
Wildegg Castle

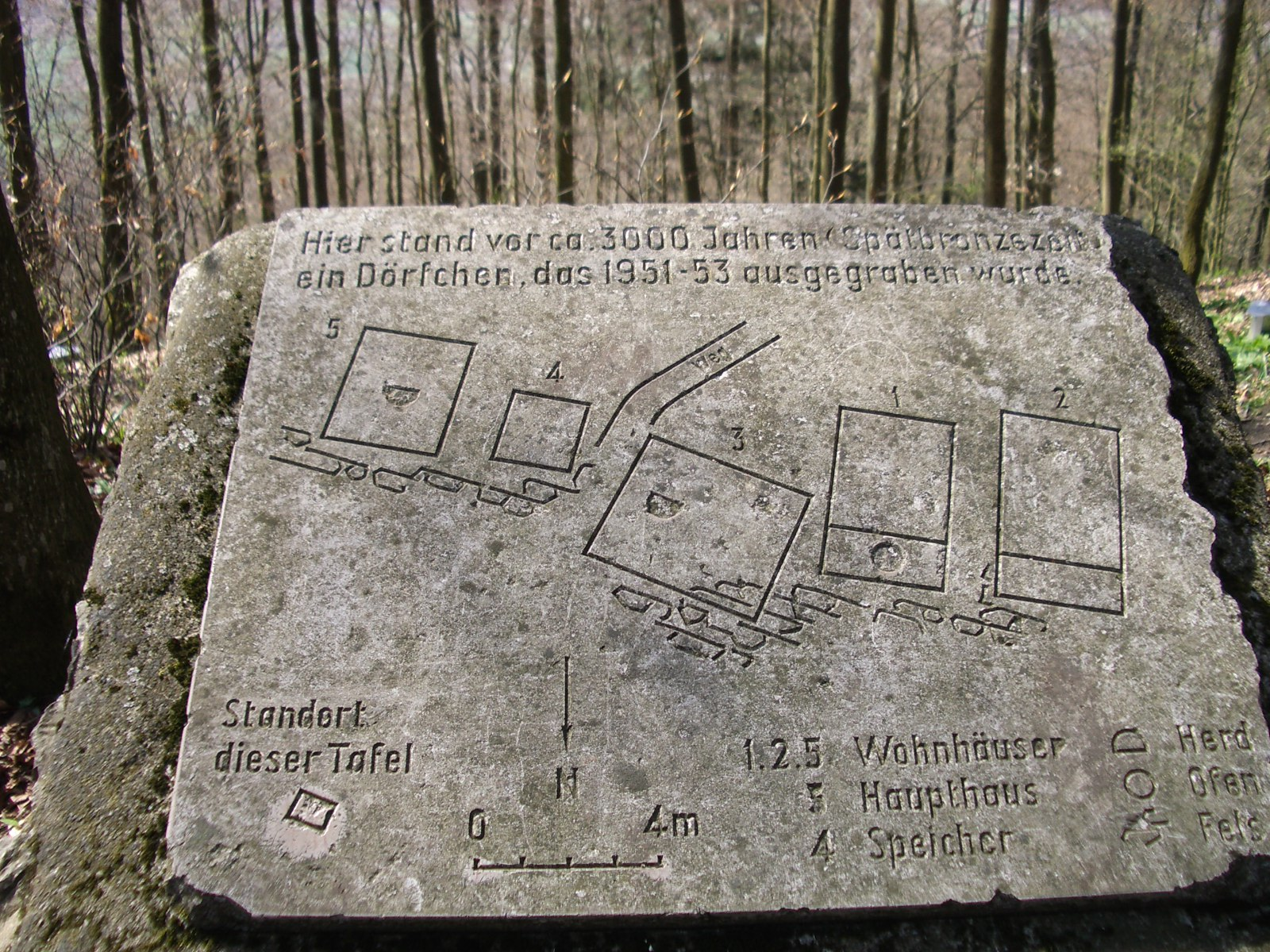
Reconstruction of the Kestenberg Bronze Age settlement

== Economy ==
As of 2007, Möriken-Wildegg had an unemployment rate of 1.72%. As of 2005, there were 42 people employed in the primary economic sector and about 12 businesses involved in this sector. 332 people are employed in the secondary sector and there are 38 businesses in this sector. 750 people are employed in the tertiary sector, with 121 businesses in this sector.

In 2000 there were 1,709 workers who lived in the municipality. Of these, 1,262 or about 73.8% of the residents worked outside Möriken-Wildegg while 675 people commuted into the municipality for work. There were a total of 1,122 jobs (of at least 6 hours per week) in the municipality. Of the working population, 14.4% used public transportation to get to work, and 51.1% used a private car.

== Religion ==
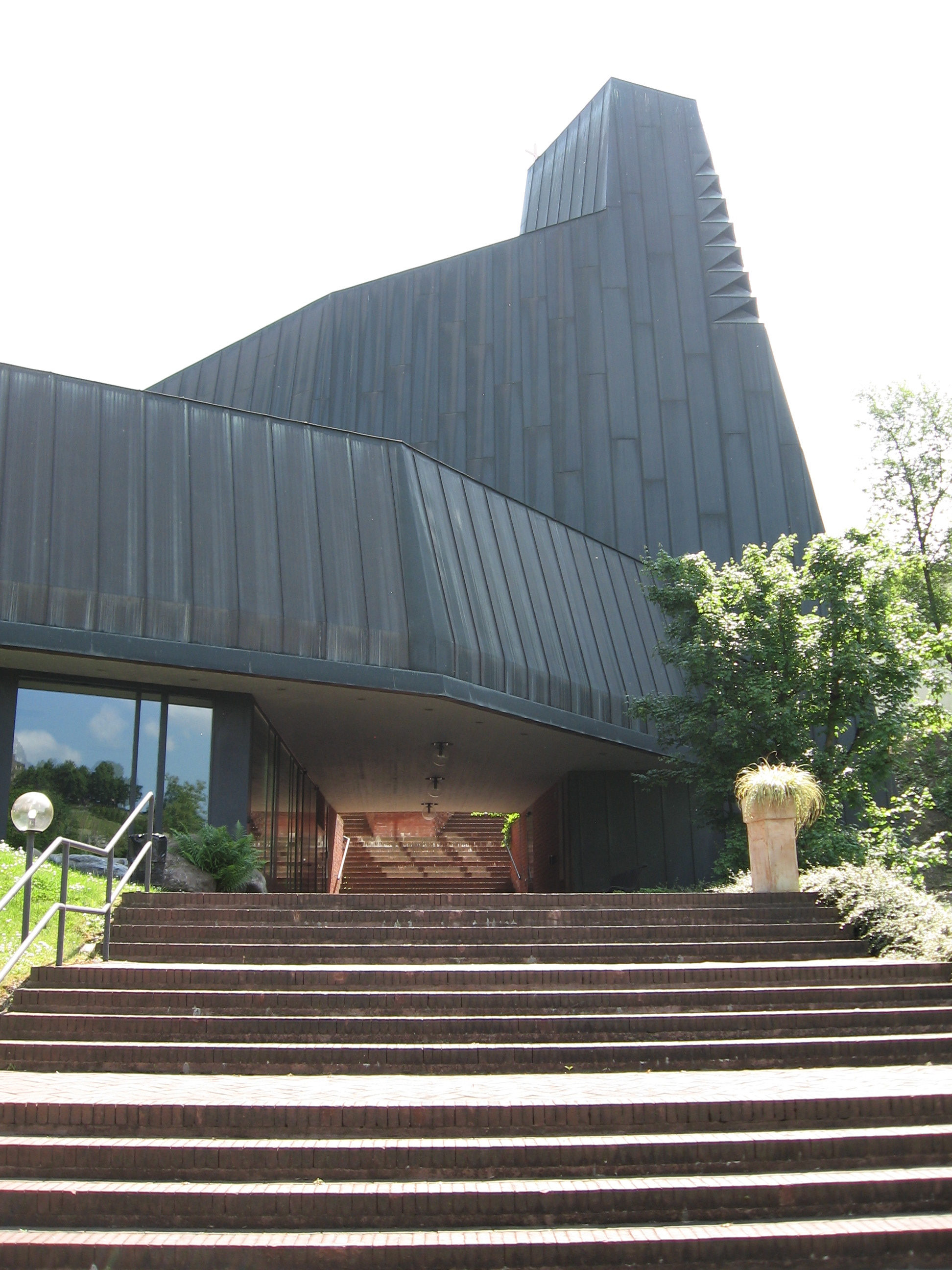
St. Antonius church in Wildegg

From the 2000 census, 856 or 25.1% were Roman Catholic, while 1,943 or 56.9% belonged to the Swiss Reformed Church. Of the rest of the population, there were 5 individuals (or about 0.15% of the population) who belonged to the Christian Catholic faith.

== Transport ==
Möriken-Wildegg sits on the Baden–Aarau line and is served by trains at Wildegg railway station.

== Education ==
In Möriken-Wildegg about 76% of the population (between age 25 and 64) have completed either non-mandatory upper secondary education or additional higher education (either university or a Fachhochschule). Of the school age population (in the 2008/2009 school year), there are 284 students attending primary school, there are 132 students attending secondary school, there are 181 students attending tertiary or university level schooling in the municipality.

== Famous citizen of Möriken-Wildegg ==
The famous U.S. actor Yul Brynner, (July 11, 1920 – October 10, 1985) was a (Swiss) citizen of Möriken-Wildegg, Aarau. His Swiss heritage is from his father (Boris Julievich Bryner) and grandfather (Jules Bryner). Jules Bryner was born close to Geneva from a Swiss German background. He died three months before his grandson Yul Brynner was born.
