= Holderbank, Aargau =

Holderbank
- Municipality
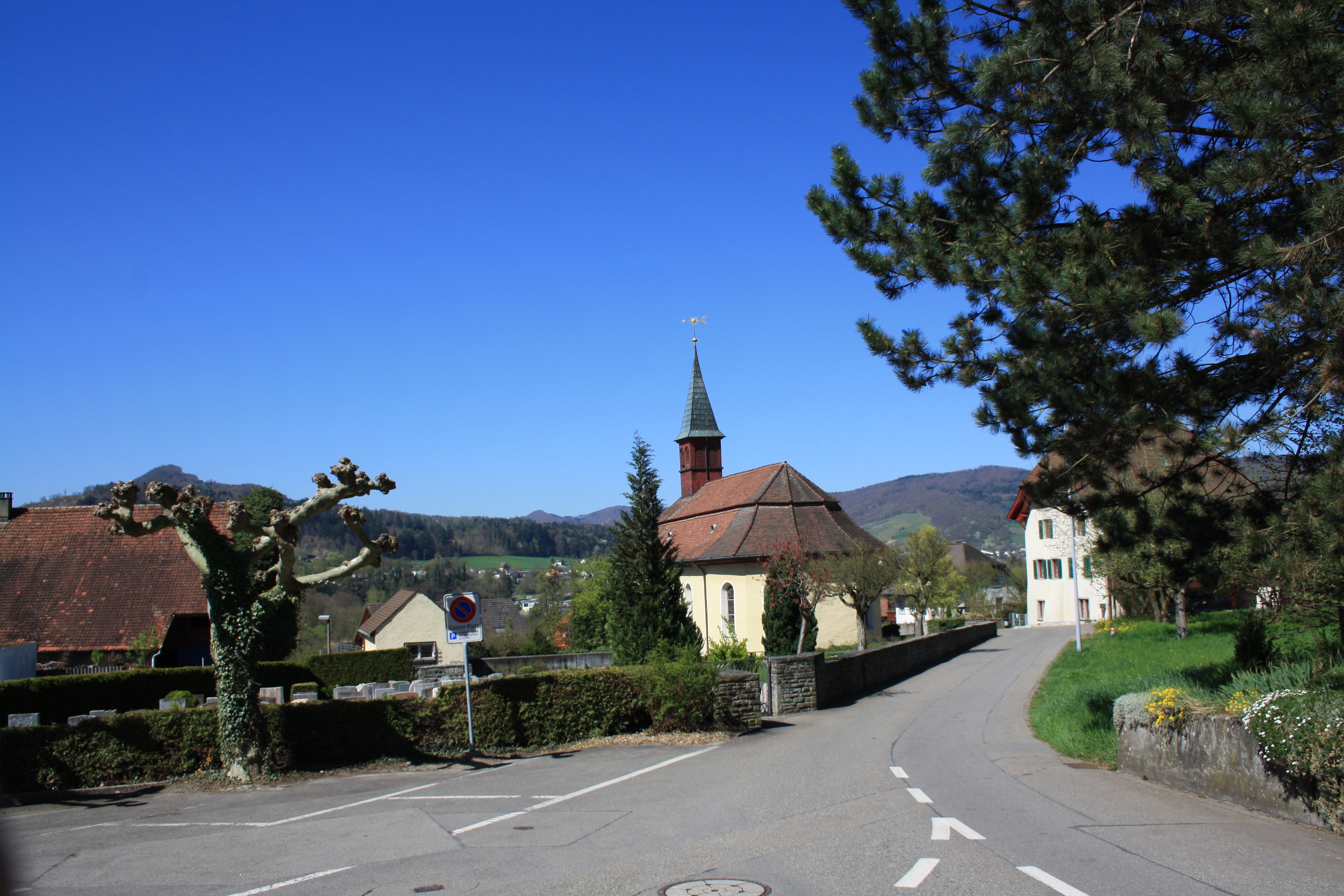

- Flag Coat of arms
- Location of Holderbank
- Location within Switzerland Location within Canton of Aargau
- Coordinates: 47°26′N 8°10′E
- Country: Switzerland
- Canton: Aargau
- District: Lenzburg

Area
  - Total: 2.32 km^{2} (0.90 sq mi)
- Elevation: 365 m (1,198 ft)

Population (December 2006)
  - Total: 866
  - Density: 373/km^{2} (967/sq mi)
- Time zone: UTC+01:00 (CET)
  - Summer (DST): UTC+02:00 (CEST)
- Postal code: 5113
- SFOS number: 4199
- ISO 3166 code: CH-AG
- Surrounded by: Lupfig, Möriken-Wildegg, Scherz, Schinznach-Bad, Schinznach-Dorf, Veltheim
- Website: www.holderbank.ch

Holderbank is a municipality in the district of Lenzburg in the canton of Aargau in Switzerland.

== History ==
Aerial view (1964)

Archeological discoveries indicate that the area around Holderbank has been occupied since the Neolithic era. Discoveries include; individual items from both the Neolithic and Bronze Ages, Roman era ruins and ceramics, and Alamanni graves. The modern municipality of Holderbank is first mentioned in 1259 as in Halderwange though this is from a 14th Century copy of the original. Around 1273 it was mentioned as de Halderwanch. Portions of the village were owned by Murbach Abbey, though they sold their holdings to the Habsburgs in 1291. The Habsburgs promptly transferred the land around Holderbank to their vassals the von Wildegg family. In addition to land, the von Wildeggs also acquired the right to low justice in the village.

The parish church in Holderbank is mentioned for the first time in 1275. It served as grave church for the Twingherren of Wildegg. They also held the rights to collect the church taxes until 1805 when they ceded those rights to the canton. After the Reformation, in 1565 the villages of Möriken and Wildegg became part of the Holderbank parish. In 1701-02 the present church was built by Samuel Jenner.

The municipality appears to have been small initially. There were only 10 fireplaces recorded in 1559 and only 11 in 1653. By 1595-96 it is unclear whether Holderbank was considered a village or just a farm. The inhabitants lived mainly from agriculture, though the Aare often washed away their land. Until the 19th Century there were vineyards in the village (about 10 hectares (25 acres) in 1764 and 19 hectares (47 acres) in 1880). In the 18th and 19th Centuries textile processing provided an additional income opportunity. From 1835 to about 1890 there was a cotton printing industry.

In 1858 a railway line was built through the village, though a train station was only added in 1999. In 1912 a lime processing factory and a portland cement factory were built. An earthenware factory was founded in 1933, which produced until the 1970s. In 1950 three quarters of the workforce worked in the industrial sector, while in 2000 roughly three-fourths work in the services sector.

== Geography ==
Holderbank has an area, as of 2009, of 2.32 square kilometers (0.90 sq mi). Of this area, 0.44 km^{2} (0.17 sq mi) or 19.0% is used for agricultural purposes, while 0.84 km^{2} (0.32 sq mi) or 36.2% is forested. Of the rest of the land, 0.71 km^{2} (0.27 sq mi) or 30.6% is settled (buildings or roads), 0.16 km^{2} (0.062 sq mi) or 6.9% is either rivers or lakes and 0.17 km^{2} (0.066 sq mi) or 7.3% is unproductive land.

Of the built up area, industrial buildings made up 6.5% of the total area while housing and buildings made up 10.8% and transportation infrastructure made up 8.2%. Power and water infrastructure as well as other special developed areas made up 3.9% of the area while parks, green belts and sports fields made up 1.3%. Out of the forested land, 32.8% of the total land area is heavily forested and 3.4% is covered with orchards or small clusters of trees. Of the agricultural land, 6.0% is used for growing crops and 12.1% is pastures. All the water in the municipality is in rivers and streams. Of the unproductive areas, 3.4% is unproductive vegetation and 3.9% is too rocky for vegetation.

The municipality is located in the Lenzburg district. It consists of the linear village of Holderbank and the hamlets of Kernenberg (also known as Heilanstalt).

== Coat of arms ==
The blazon of the municipal coat of arms is Gules an Elder-tree proper issuant from a circular Bench Argent. This is an example of canting with the elder tree (German: Holunder) and the bench (German: Bank) symbolizing the name of the municipality."

== Demographics ==
Holderbank has a population (as of December 2020) of 1,408. As of June 2009, 24.5% of the population are foreign nationals. Over the last 10 years (1997–2007) the population has changed at a rate of 4.4%. Most of the population (as of 2000) speaks German (83.7%), with Serbo-Croatian being second most common ( 5.1%) and Italian being third ( 5.0%).

The age distribution, as of 2008, in Holderbank is; 90 children or 10.4% of the population are between 0 and 9 years old and 77 teenagers or 8.9% are between 10 and 19. Of the adult population, 101 people or 11.7% of the population are between 20 and 29 years old. 122 people or 14.1% are between 30 and 39, 148 people or 17.1% are between 40 and 49, and 147 people or 17.0% are between 50 and 59. The senior population distribution is 97 people or 11.2% of the population are between 60 and 69 years old, 49 people or 5.7% are between 70 and 79, there are 30 people or 3.5% who are between 80 and 89, and there are 3 people or 0.3% who are 90 and older.

As of 2000 the average number of residents per living room was 0.55 which is about equal to the cantonal average of 0.57 per room. In this case, a room is defined as space of a housing unit of at least 4 m^{2} (43 sq ft) as normal bedrooms, dining rooms, living rooms, kitchens and habitable cellars and attics. About 59.4% of the total households were owner occupied, or in other words did not pay rent (though they may have a mortgage or a rent-to-own agreement).

As of 2000, there were 22 homes with 1 or 2 persons in the household, 176 homes with 3 or 4 persons in the household, and 115 homes with 5 or more persons in the household. As of 2000, there were 320 private households (homes and apartments) in the municipality, and an average of 2.4 persons per household. In 2008 there were 156 single family homes (or 38.1% of the total) out of a total of 409 homes and apartments. There were a total of 8 empty apartments for a 2.0% vacancy rate. As of 2007, the construction rate of new housing units was 1.2 new units per 1000 residents.

In the 2007 federal election the most popular party was the SVP which received 58.4% of the vote. The next three most popular parties were the SP (11.2%), the FDP (10.4%) and the CVP (5.1%).

The historical population is given in the following table:

Historical population
| Year | Pop. | ±% |
|---|---|---|
| 1764 | 155 | — |
| 1850 | 281 | +81.3% |
| 1900 | 303 | +7.8% |
| 1950 | 622 | +105.3% |
| 2000 | 804 | +29.3% |

== Economy ==
As of 2007, Holderbank had an unemployment rate of 3.38%. As of 2005, there were 14 people employed in the primary economic sector and about 3 businesses involved in this sector. 72 people are employed in the secondary sector and there are 12 businesses in this sector. 602 people are employed in the tertiary sector, with 28 businesses in this sector.

In 2000 there were 411 workers who lived in the municipality. Of these, 324 or about 78.8% of the residents worked outside Holderbank while 473 people commuted into the municipality for work. There were a total of 560 jobs (of at least 6 hours per week) in the municipality. Of the working population, 7.6% used public transportation to get to work, and 59% used a private car.

== Religion ==
From the 2000 census, 231 or 28.7% were Roman Catholic, while 388 or 48.3% belonged to the Swiss Reformed Church.

== Transport ==
Holderbank sits on the Baden–Aarau line and is served by trains at Holderbank railway station.

== Education ==
The entire Swiss population is generally well educated. In Holderbank about 63.3% of the population (between age 25-64) have completed either non-mandatory upper secondary education or additional higher education (either university or a Fachhochschule). Of the school age population (in the 2008/2009 school year), there are 49 students attending primary school in the municipality.
