= Scherz =

- Former municipality
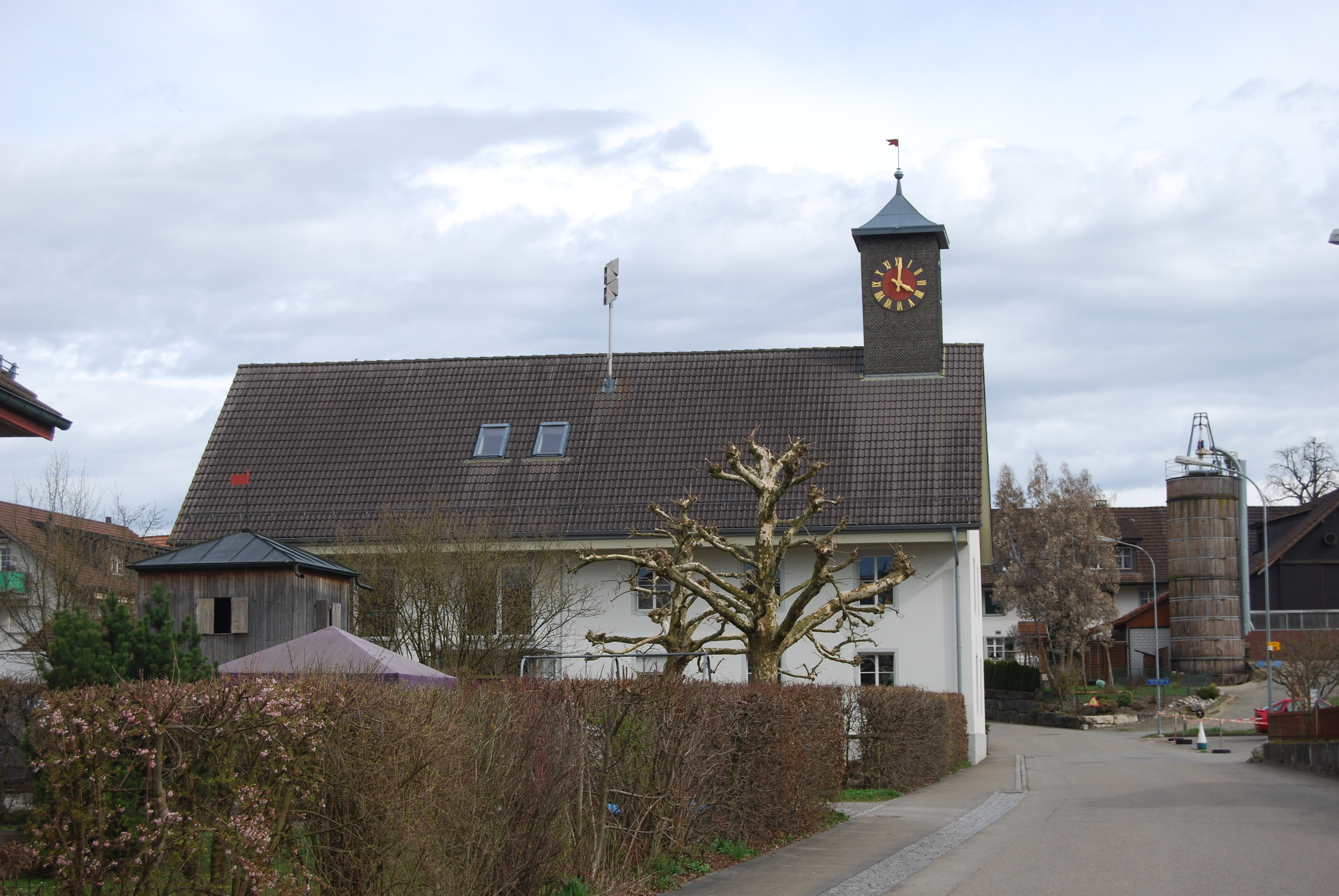

- Flag Coat of arms
- Location of Scherz
- Location within Switzerland Location within Canton of Aargau
- Coordinates: 47°27′N 8°11′E
- Country: Switzerland
- Canton: Aargau
- District: Brugg

Area
  - Total: 3.30 km^{2} (1.27 sq mi)
- Elevation: 408 m (1,339 ft)

Population (December 2020)
  - Total: 652
  - Density: 198/km^{2} (512/sq mi)
- Time zone: UTC+01:00 (CET)
  - Summer (DST): UTC+02:00 (CEST)
- Postal code: 5246
- SFOS number: 4113
- ISO 3166 code: CH-AG
- Surrounded by: Habsburg, Hausen, Holderbank, Lupfig, Schinznach-Bad
- Website: scherz.ch

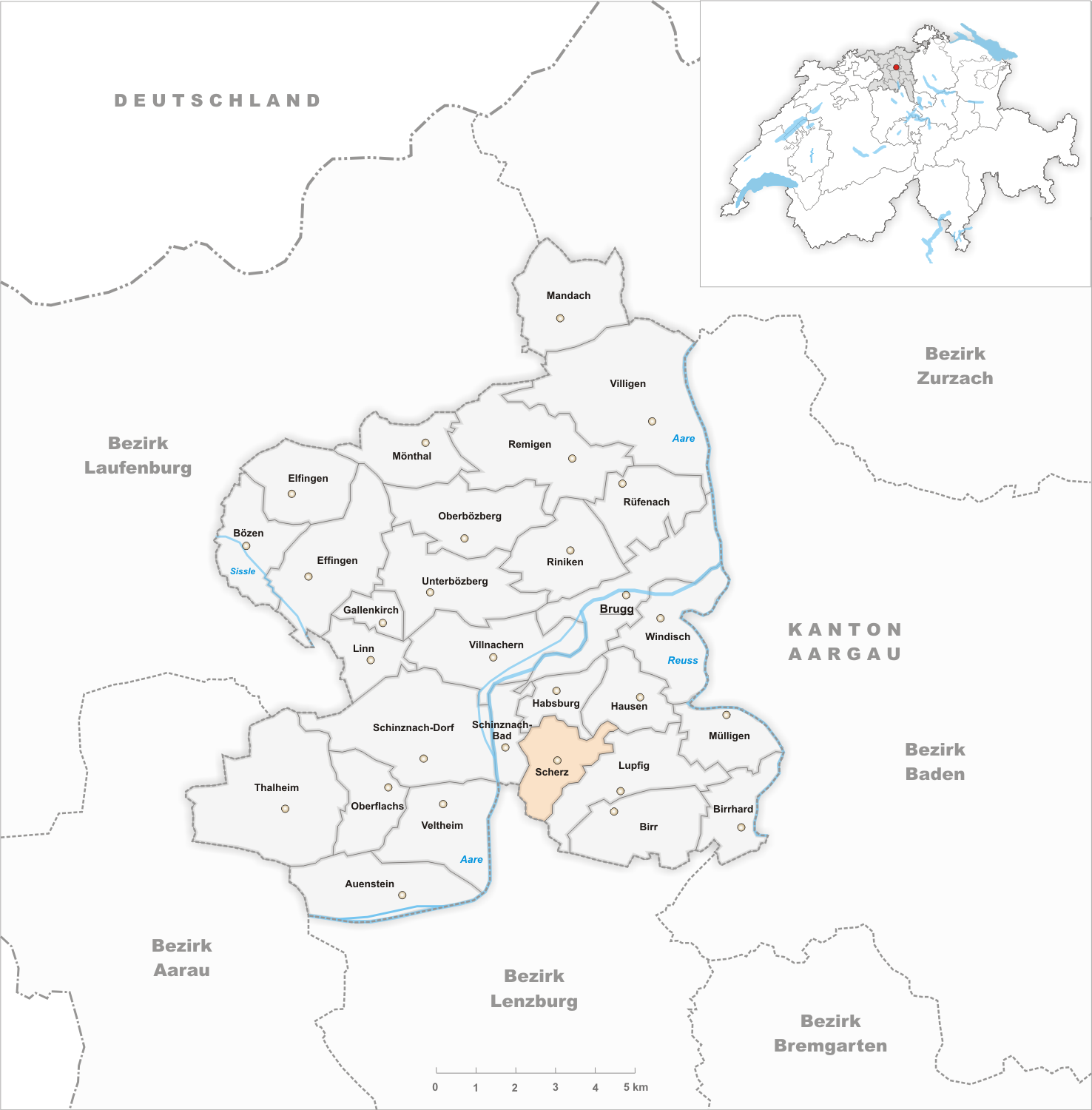
Scherz

Scherz is a former municipality in the district of Brugg in canton of Aargau in Switzerland. On 1 January 2018 the former municipality of Scherz merged into the municipality of Lupfig.

== Geography ==
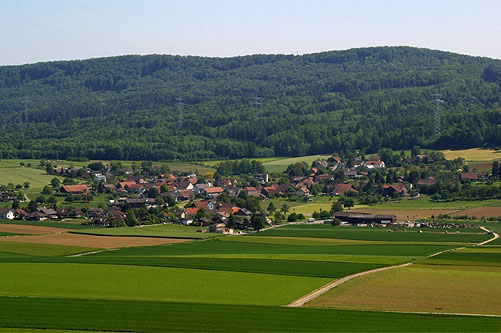
Scherz

Aerial view from 2000 m by Walter Mittelholzer (1923)

Scherz has an area, as of 2009, of 3.3 square kilometers (1.3 sq mi). Of this area, 1.82 square kilometers (0.70 sq mi) or 55.2% is used for agricultural purposes, while 1.1 square kilometers (0.42 sq mi) or 33.3% is forested. Of the rest of the land, 0.39 square kilometers (0.15 sq mi) or 11.8% is settled (buildings or roads), 0.02 km^{2} (4.9 acres) or 0.6% is either rivers or lakes.

Of the built up area, housing and buildings made up 5.2% and transportation infrastructure made up 5.5%. 33.0% of the total land area is heavily forested. Of the agricultural land, 41.8% is used for growing crops and 9.4% is pastures, while 3.9% is used for orchards or vine crops. All the water in the municipality is in rivers and streams.

== Coat of arms ==
The blazon of the municipal coat of arms is Argent a feather Gules between two other Or all issuant from a Heart Gules. This might be an example of canting, since the heart (German: Herz) is part of the name Scherz.

== Demographics ==
Scherz has a population (as of December 2020) of 652 As of June 2009, 8.3% of the population are foreign nationals. Over the last 10 years (1997–2007) the population has changed at a rate of -1.3%. Most of the population (as of 2000) speaks German (95.5%), with Albanian being second most common ( 1.7%) and French being third ( 1.6%).

The age distribution, as of 2008, in Scherz is; 76 children or 12.3% of the population are between 0 and 9 years old and 77 teenagers or 12.5% are between 10 and 19. Of the adult population, 60 people or 9.7% of the population are between 20 and 29 years old. 77 people or 12.5% are between 30 and 39, 121 people or 19.6% are between 40 and 49, and 84 people or 13.6% are between 50 and 59. The senior population distribution is 73 people or 11.8% of the population are between 60 and 69 years old, 40 people or 6.5% are between 70 and 79, there are 8 people or 1.3% who are between 80 and 89, and there is 1 person who is 90 or older.

As of 2000, there were 10 homes with 1 or 2 persons in the household, 86 homes with 3 or 4 persons in the household, and 117 homes with 5 or more persons in the household. The average number of people per household was 2.52 individuals. In 2008 there were 120 single family homes (or 48.6% of the total) out of a total of 247 homes and apartments. There were a total of 4 empty apartments for a 1.6% vacancy rate. As of 2007, the construction rate of new housing units was 1.7 new units per 1000 residents.

In the 2007 federal election the most popular party was the SVP which received 48.6% of the vote. The next three most popular parties were the SP (21.4%), the Green Party (8.7%) and the CSP (7.8%).

In Scherz about 86.9% of the population (between age 25–64) have completed either non-mandatory upper secondary education or additional higher education (either university or a Fachhochschule). Of the school age population (in the 2008/2009 school year), there are 67 students attending primary school in the municipality.

The historical population is given in the following table:

Historical population
Year	Pop.	±%
1975	410	—
1980	441	+7.6%
1990	514	+16.6%
2000	576	+12.1%

== Economy ==
As of 2007, Scherz had an unemployment rate of 1.89%. As of 2005, there were 37 people employed in the primary economic sector and about 15 businesses involved in this sector. 16 people are employed in the secondary sector and there are 6 businesses in this sector. 58 people are employed in the tertiary sector, with 17 businesses in this sector.

As of 2000 there was a total of 303 workers who lived in the municipality. Of these, 242 or about 79.9% of the residents worked outside Scherz while 28 people commuted into the municipality for work. There were a total of 89 jobs (of at least 6 hours per week) in the municipality. Of the working population, 12.3% used public transportation to get to work, and 57.4% used a private car.

== Religion ==
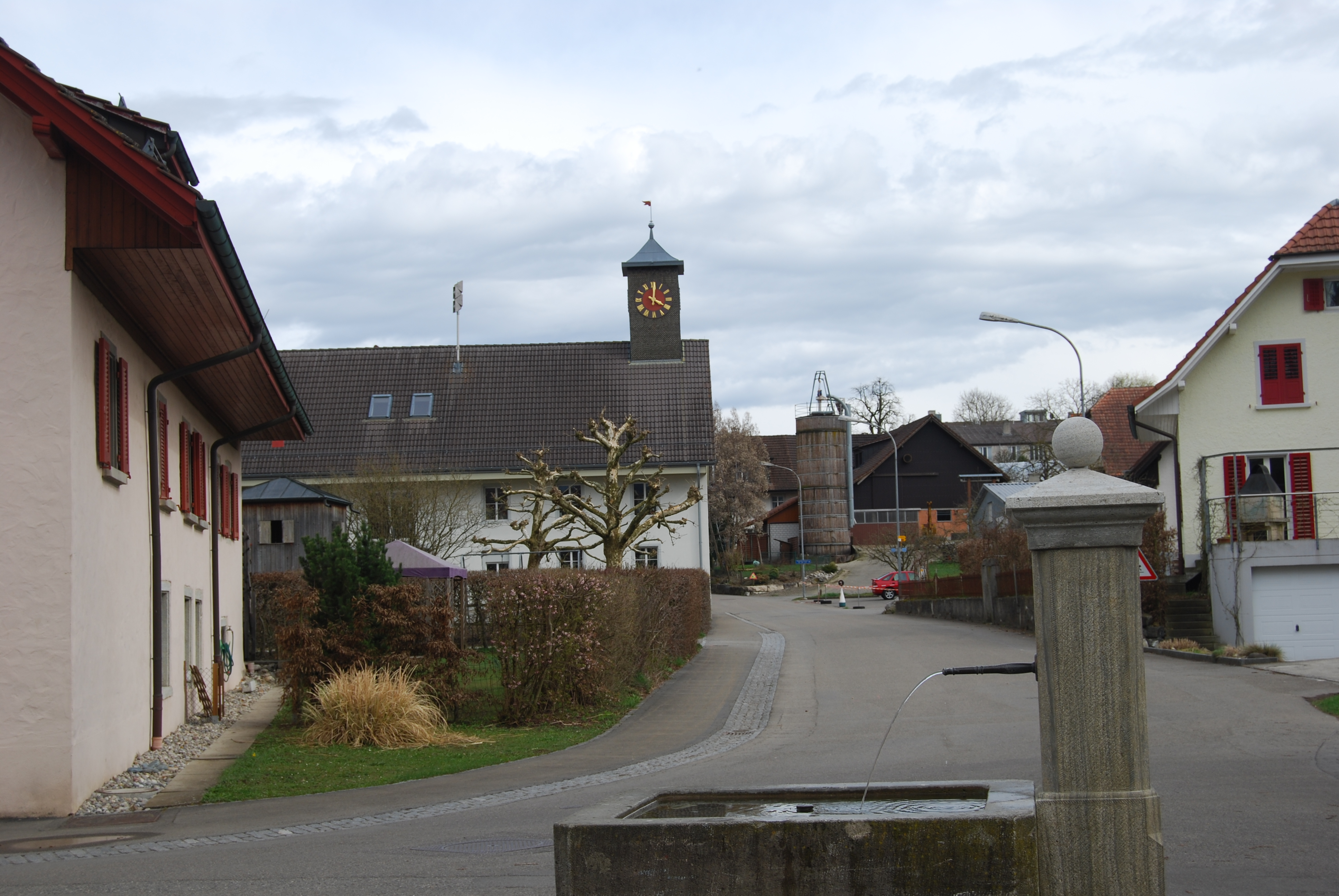
Church of Scherz

From the 2000 census, 129 or 22.4% were Roman Catholic, while 319 or 55.5% belonged to the Swiss Reformed Church.
