= Schinznach-Bad =

- Former municipality
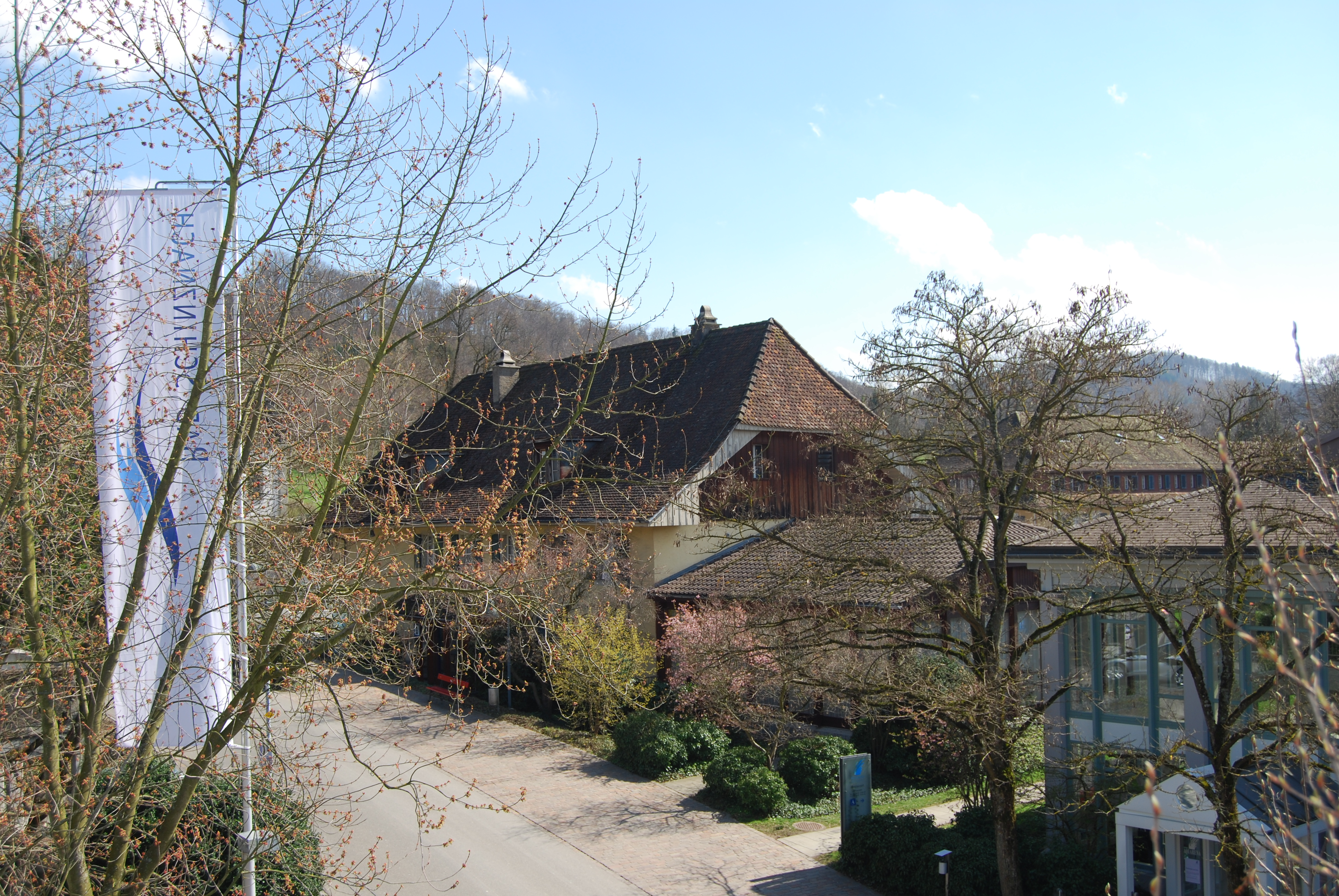
- Schinznach-Bad spa park

- Flag Coat of arms
- Location of Schinznach-Bad
- Location within Switzerland Location within Canton of Aargau
- Coordinates: 47°27′N 8°10′E
- Country: Switzerland
- Canton: Aargau
- District: Brugg

Area
  - Total: 1.90 km^{2} (0.73 sq mi)
- Elevation: 354 m (1,161 ft)

Population (December 2020)
  - Total: 1,346
  - Density: 708/km^{2} (1,830/sq mi)
- Time zone: UTC+01:00 (CET)
  - Summer (DST): UTC+02:00 (CEST)
- Postal code: 5116
- SFOS number: 4114
- ISO 3166 code: CH-AG
- Surrounded by: Brugg, Habsburg, Holderbank, Scherz, Schinznach-Dorf, Villnachern
- Website: schinznach-bad.ch

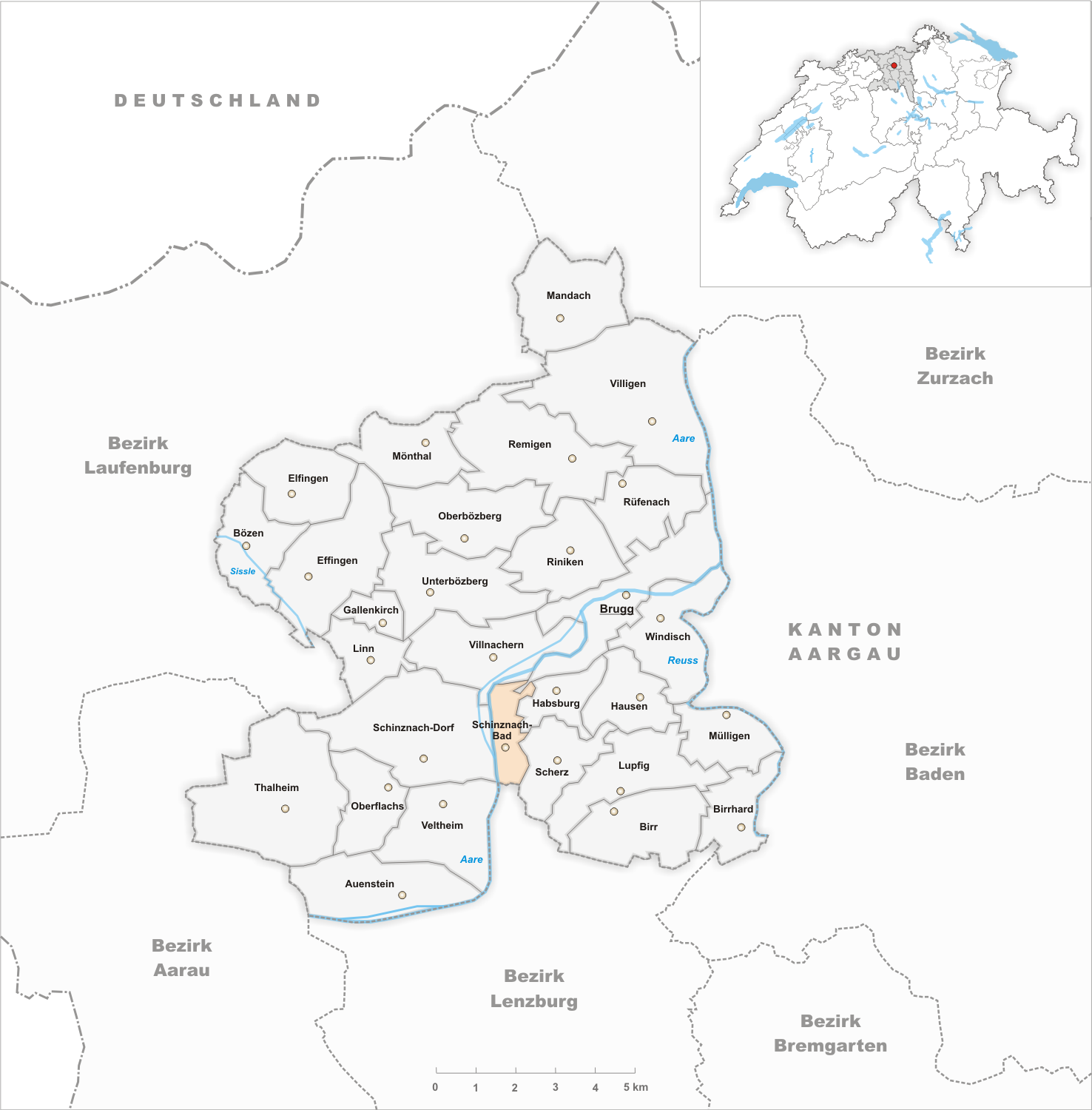
Schinznach-Bad

Schinznach-Bad is a former municipality in the district of Brugg in canton of Aargau in Switzerland. On 1 January 2020 the municipality of Schinznach-Bad merged into Brugg.

== Geography ==
Aerial view (1964)

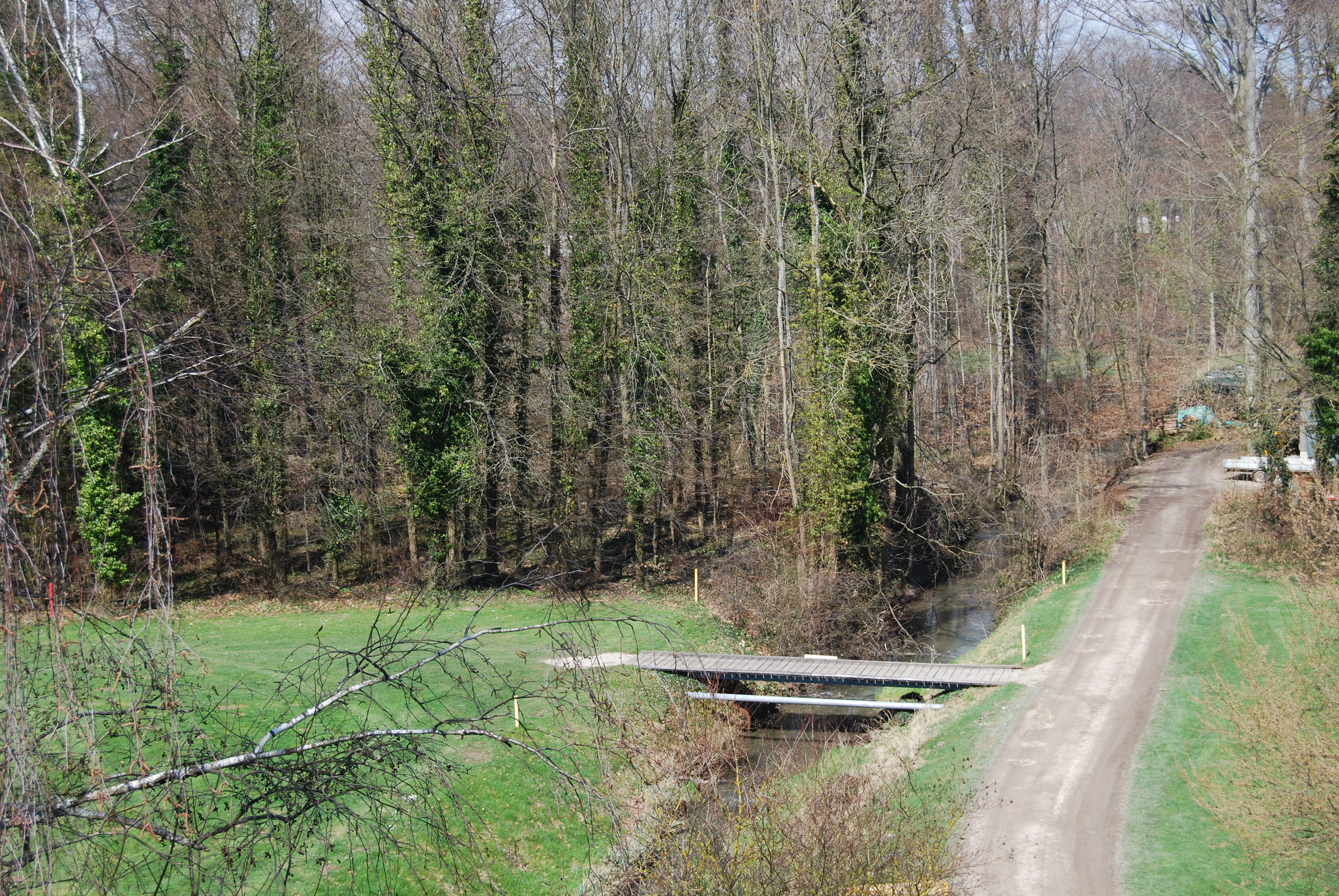
Riparian Forest in the north of Schinznach-Bad

Schinznach-Bad has an area, as of 2009, of 1.9 square kilometers (0.73 sq mi). Of this area, 0.1 km^{2} (25 acres) or 5.3% is used for agricultural purposes, while 0.74 square kilometers (0.29 sq mi) or 38.9% is forested. Of the rest of the land, 0.86 square kilometers (0.33 sq mi) or 45.3% is settled (buildings or roads), 0.18 square kilometers (0.069 sq mi) or 9.5% is either rivers or lakes and 0.01 km^{2} (2.5 acres) or 0.5% is unproductive land.

Of the built up area, industrial buildings made up 3.7% of the total area while housing and buildings made up 15.3% and transportation infrastructure made up 12.1%. while parks, green belts and sports fields made up 13.7%. 37.4% of the total land area is heavily forested and 1.6% is covered with orchards or small clusters of trees. Of the agricultural land, 2.6% is used for growing crops and 2.6% is pastures. All the water in the municipality is in rivers and streams.

== Coat of arms ==
The blazon of the municipal coat of arms is Azure two Mullets Or and between them in chief a Crescent of the same and in base three barrulets wavy Argent.

== Demographics ==
Schinznach-Bad has a population (as of December 2020) of 1,346. As of June 2009, 26.4% of the population are foreign nationals. Over the last 10 years (1997–2007) the population has changed at a rate of -0.5%. Most of the population (as of 2000) speaks German (80.8%), with Serbo-Croatian being second most common ( 5.6%) and Albanian being third ( 2.5%).

The age distribution, as of 2008, in Schinznach-Bad is; 106 children or 8.6% of the population are between 0 and 9 years old and 150 teenagers or 12.1% are between 10 and 19. Of the adult population, 166 people or 13.4% of the population are between 20 and 29 years old. 150 people or 12.1% are between 30 and 39, 206 people or 16.6% are between 40 and 49, and 191 people or 15.4% are between 50 and 59. The senior population distribution is 126 people or 10.2% of the population are between 60 and 69 years old, 88 people or 7.1% are between 70 and 79, there are 49 people or 4.0% who are between 80 and 89, and there are 7 people or 0.6% who are 90 and older.

At the same time there were 501 private households (homes and apartments) in the municipality, and an average of 2.5 persons per household.

As of 2000, there were 55 homes with 1 or 2 persons in the household, 250 homes with 3 or 4 persons in the household, and 190 homes with 5 or more persons in the household. The average number of people per household was 2.45 individuals. In 2008 there were 208 single family homes (or 36.7% of the total) out of a total of 566 homes and apartments. There were a total of 6 empty apartments for a 1.1% vacancy rate. As of 2007, the construction rate of new housing units was 0.8 new units per 1000 residents.

In the 2007 federal election the most popular party was the SVP which received 37.6% of the vote. The next three most popular parties were the FDP (20.3%), the SP (14.8%) and the CVP (9%).

In Schinznach-Bad about 68.8% of the population (between age 25–64) have completed either non-mandatory upper secondary education or additional higher education (either university or a Fachhochschule). Of the school age population (in the 2008/2009 school year), there are 78 students attending primary school in the municipality.

The historical population is given in the following table:

Historical population
Year	Pop.	±%
1975	1,075	—
1980	962	−10.5%
1990	1,202	+24.9%
2000	1,248	+3.8%

== Sights ==
The village of Schinznach-Bad is designated as part of the Inventory of Swiss Heritage Sites.

== Economy ==
As of 2007, Schinznach-Bad had an unemployment rate of 2.89%. As of 2005, there were 8 people employed in the primary economic sector and about 2 businesses involved in this sector. 152 people are employed in the secondary sector and there are 2 businesses in this sector. 944 people are employed in the tertiary sector, with 57 businesses in this sector.

As of 2000 there was a total of 666 workers who lived in the municipality. Of these, 493 or about 74.0% of the residents worked outside Schinznach-Bad while 784 people commuted into the municipality for work. There were a total of 957 jobs (of at least 6 hours per week) in the municipality. Of the working population, 15.5% used public transportation to get to work, and 50.5% used a private car.

== Religion ==
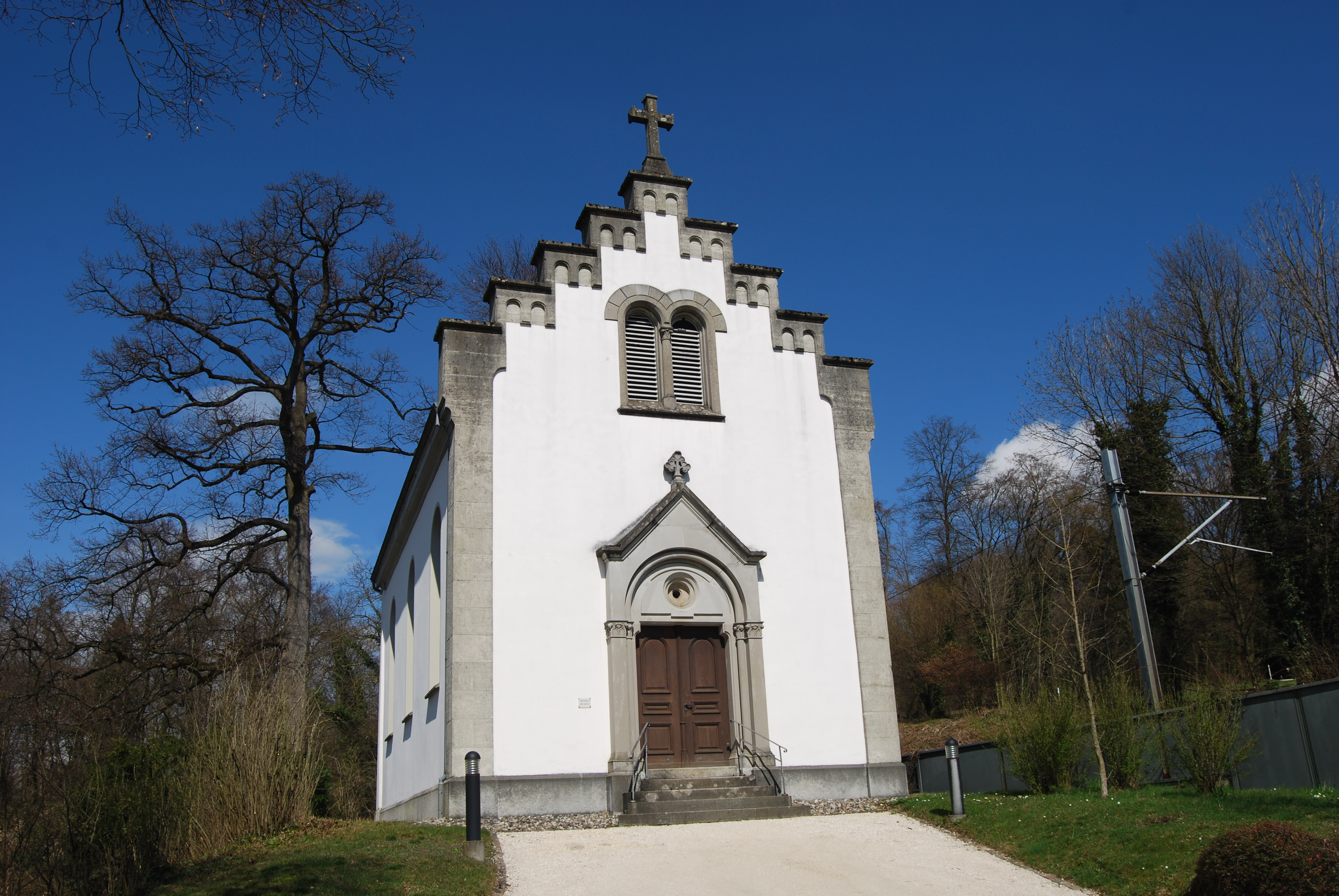
Schinznach-Bad spa chapel

From the 2000 census, 349 or 27.7% were Roman Catholic, while 509 or 40.5% belonged to the Swiss Reformed Church. Of the rest of the population, there were 2 individuals (or about 0.16% of the population) who belonged to the Christian Catholic faith.
