= Municipalities of the canton of Aargau =

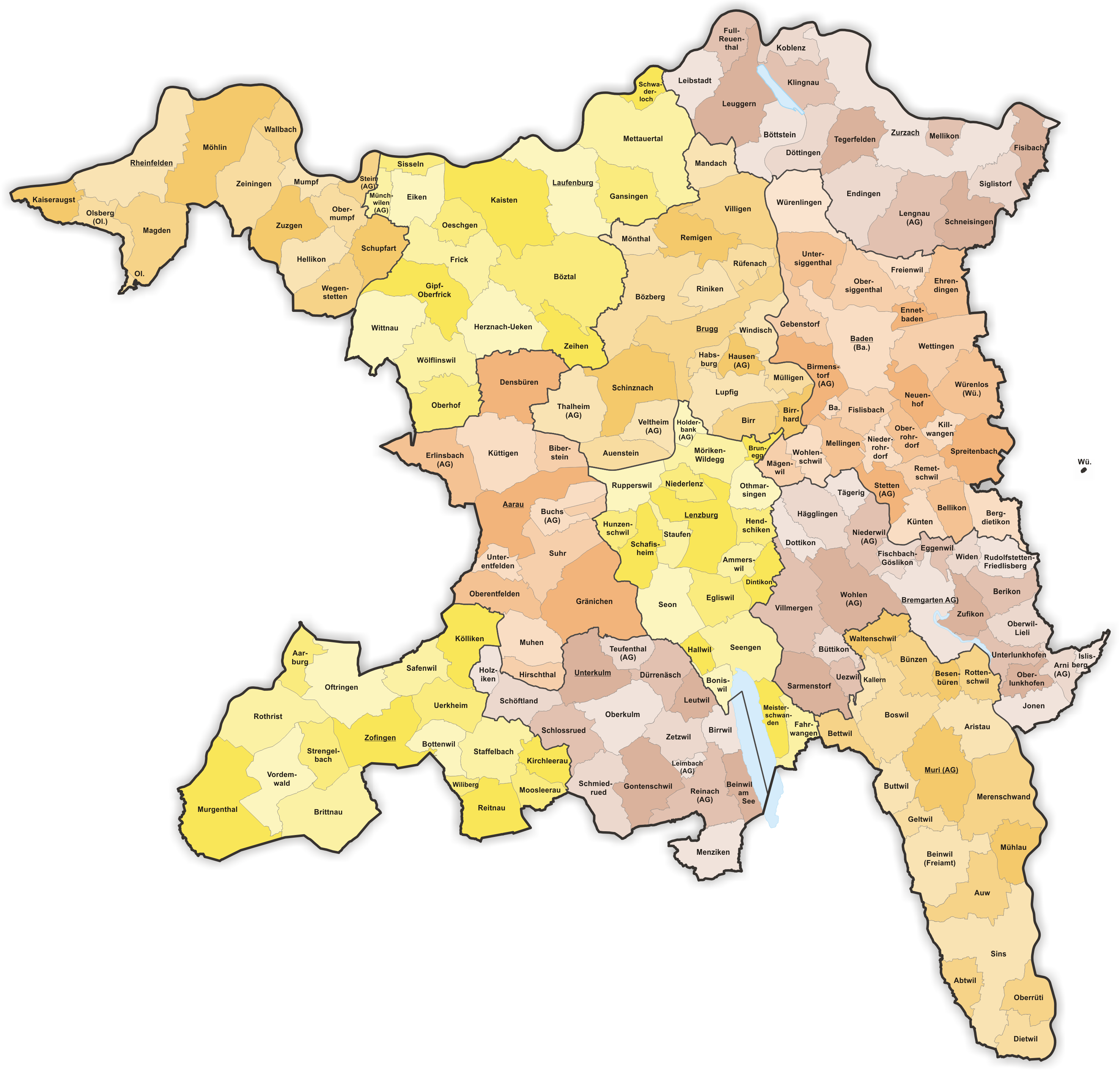
Municipalities (and districts) in the canton of Aargau

These are the 196 municipalities of the canton of Aargau, Switzerland (as of January 2026).

== List ==
- Aarau
- Aarburg
- Abtwil
- Ammerswil
- Aristau
- Arni
- Auenstein
- Auw
- Baden
- Beinwil (Freiamt)
- Beinwil am See
- Bellikon
- Bergdietikon
- Berikon
- Besenbüren
- Bettwil
- Biberstein
- Birmenstorf
- Birr
- Birrhard
- Birrwil
- Boniswil
- Boswil
- Bottenwil
- Böttstein
- Bözberg
- Böztal
- Bremgarten
- Brittnau
- Brugg
- Brunegg
- Buchs
- Bünzen
- Büttikon
- Buttwil
- Densbüren
- Dietwil
- Dintikon
- Dottikon
- Döttingen
- Dürrenäsch
- Eggenwil
- Egliswil
- Ehrendingen
- Eiken
- Endingen
- Ennetbaden
- Erlinsbach
- Fahrwangen
- Fischbach-Göslikon
- Fisibach
- Fislisbach
- Freienwil
- Frick
- Full-Reuenthal
- Gansingen
- Gebenstorf
- Geltwil
- Gipf-Oberfrick
- Gontenschwil
- Gränichen
- Habsburg
- Hägglingen
- Hallwil
- Hausen bei Brugg
- Hellikon
- Hendschiken
- Herznach-Ueken
- Hirschthal
- Holderbank
- Holziken
- Hunzenschwil
- Islisberg
- Jonen
- Kaiseraugst
- Kaisten
- Kallern
- Killwangen
- Kirchleerau
- Klingnau
- Koblenz
- Kölliken
- Künten
- Küttigen
- Laufenburg
- Leibstadt
- Leimbach
- Lengnau
- Lenzburg
- Leuggern
- Leutwil
- Lupfig
- Magden
- Mägenwil
- Mandach
- Meisterschwanden
- Mellikon
- Mellingen
- Menziken
- Merenschwand
- Mettauertal
- Möhlin
- Mönthal
- Moosleerau
- Möriken-Wildegg
- Muhen
- Mühlau
- Mülligen
- Mumpf
- Münchwilen
- Murgenthal
- Muri
- Neuenhof
- Niederlenz
- Niederrohrdorf
- Niederwil
- Oberentfelden
- Oberhof
- Oberkulm
- Oberlunkhofen
- Obermumpf
- Oberrohrdorf
- Oberrüti
- Obersiggenthal
- Oberwil-Lieli
- Oeschgen
- Oftringen
- Olsberg
- Othmarsingen
- Reinach
- Reitnau
- Remetschwil
- Remigen
- Rheinfelden
- Riniken
- Rothrist
- Rottenschwil
- Rudolfstetten-Friedlisberg
- Rüfenach
- Rupperswil
- Safenwil
- Sarmenstorf
- Schafisheim
- Schinznach
- Schlossrued
- Schmiedrued
- Schneisingen
- Schöftland
- Schupfart
- Schwaderloch
- Seengen
- Seon
- Siglistorf
- Sins
- Sisseln
- Spreitenbach
- Staffelbach
- Staufen
- Stein
- Stetten
- Strengelbach
- Suhr
- Tägerig
- Tegerfelden
- Teufenthal
- Thalheim
- Uerkheim
- Uezwil
- Unterentfelden
- Unterkulm
- Unterlunkhofen
- Untersiggenthal
- Veltheim
- Villigen
- Villmergen
- Vordemwald
- Wallbach
- Waltenschwil
- Wegenstetten
- Wettingen
- Widen
- Wiliberg
- Windisch
- Wittnau
- Wohlen
- Wohlenschwil
- Wölflinswil
- Würenlingen
- Würenlos
- Zeihen
- Zeiningen
- Zetzwil
- Zofingen
- Zufikon
- Zurzach
- Zuzgen

== Changes ==
=== Mergers ===
As with most Swiss cantons there has been a trend since the early 2000s for municipalities to merge, though mergers in Aargau have so far been less radical than in other cantons.

The following mergers between the canton's municipalities have occurred since 2000:

- 2002: Mühlethal merged into Zofingen
- 2006: Oberehrendingen and Unterehrendingen combined to create Ehrendingen
- 2006: Stilli merged into Villigen
- 2010: Hilfikon merged into Villmergen
- 2010: Rohr merged into Aarau
- 2010: Etzgen, Hottwil, Mettau, Oberhofen and Wil combined to create Mettauertal
- 2010: Umiken merged into Brugg
- 2010: Sulz merged into Laufenburg
- 2010: Ittenthal merged into Kaisten
- 2012: Benzenschwil merged into Merenschwand
- 2013: Gallenkirch, Linn, Oberbözberg and Unterbözberg combined to create Bözberg
- 2014: Hermetschwil-Staffeln merged into Bremgarten
- 2014: Oberflachs and Schinznach-Dorf combined to create Schinznach
- 2014: Unterendingen merged into Endingen
- 2018: Scherz merged into Lupfig
- 2019: Attelwil merged into Reitnau
- 2020: Schinznach-Bad merged into Brugg
- 2022: Bad Zurzach, Baldingen, Böbikon, Kaiserstuhl, Rekingen, Rietheim, Rümikon and Wislikofen combined to create Zurzach
- 2022: Bözen, Effingen, Elfingen and Hornussen combined to create Böztal
- 2023: Herznach and Ueken combined to create Herznach-Ueken
- 2023: Burg merged into Menziken
- 2024: Turgi merged into Baden
- 2026: Villnachern merged into Brugg

=== Separations ===
1983: Arni-Islisberg split into two new municipalities — Arni and Islisberg

=== Name changes ===
1984: Oberwil became Oberwil-Lieli
