= Mettauertal =

- Municipality
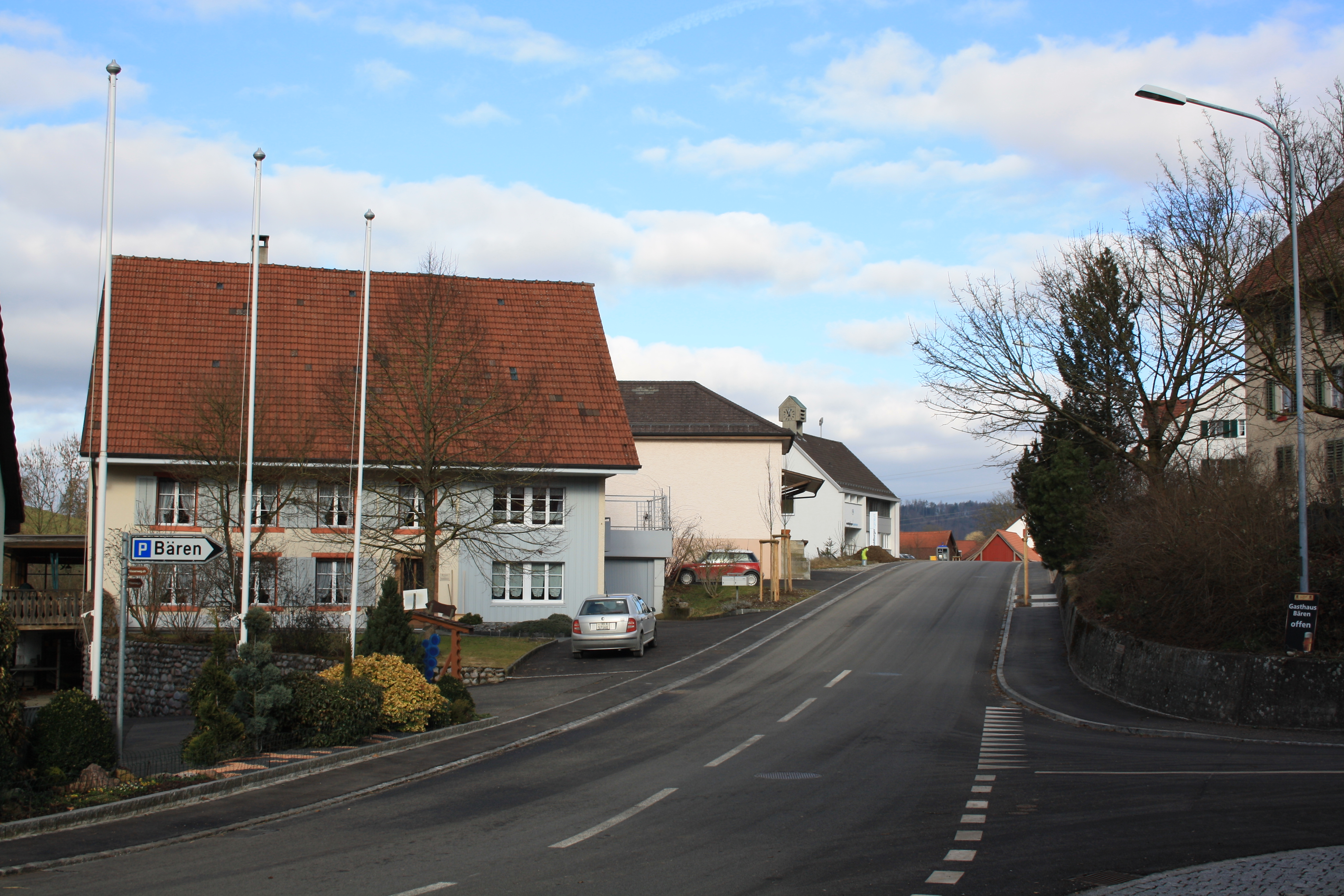

- Flag Coat of arms
- Location of Mettauertal
- Location within Switzerland Location within Canton of Aargau
- Coordinates: 47°34′N 8°9′E
- Country: Switzerland
- Canton: Aargau
- District: Laufenburg

Area
  - Total: 21.56 km^{2} (8.32 sq mi)
- Elevation: 381 m (1,250 ft)

Population (December 2006)
  - Total: 2,007
  - Density: 93.09/km^{2} (241.1/sq mi)
- Time zone: UTC+01:00 (CET)
  - Summer (DST): UTC+02:00 (CEST)
- Postal code: 5276
- SFOS number: 4184
- ISO 3166 code: CH-AG
- Surrounded by: Gansingen, Laufenburg, Leibstadt, Leuggern, Mandach, Remigen, Schwaderloch, Villigen
- Website: www.wil-ag.ch

Mettauertal is a municipality in the district of Laufenburg in the canton of Aargau in Switzerland. On 1 January 2010 the municipalities of Hottwil, Etzgen, Mettau, Oberhofen and Wil merged to form the new municipality of Mettauertal.

== Geography ==
Mettauertal had an area, (as of the 2004/09 survey) of 21.59 km^{2} (8.34 sq mi). Of this area, about 51.2% is used for agricultural purposes, while 40.1% is forested. Of the rest of the land, 7.5% is settled (buildings or roads) and 1.3% is unproductive land. Over the past two decades (1979/85-2004/09) the amount of land that is settled has increased by 26 ha (64 acres) and the agricultural land has decreased by 36 ha (89 acres).

== Demographics ==
Mettauertal has a population (as of December 2020) of 2,067. As of 2013, 11.3% of the population are resident foreign nationals. Over the last 3 years (2010-2013) the population has changed at a rate of -1.39%. The birth rate in the municipality, in 2013, was 9.4 while the death rate was 5.2 per thousand residents.

As of 2013, children and teenagers (0–19 years old) make up 18.8% of the population, while adults (20–64 years old) are 62.4% and seniors (over 64 years old) make up 18.7%.

== Historic Population ==
The historical population is given in the following chart:

== Heritage sites of national significance ==
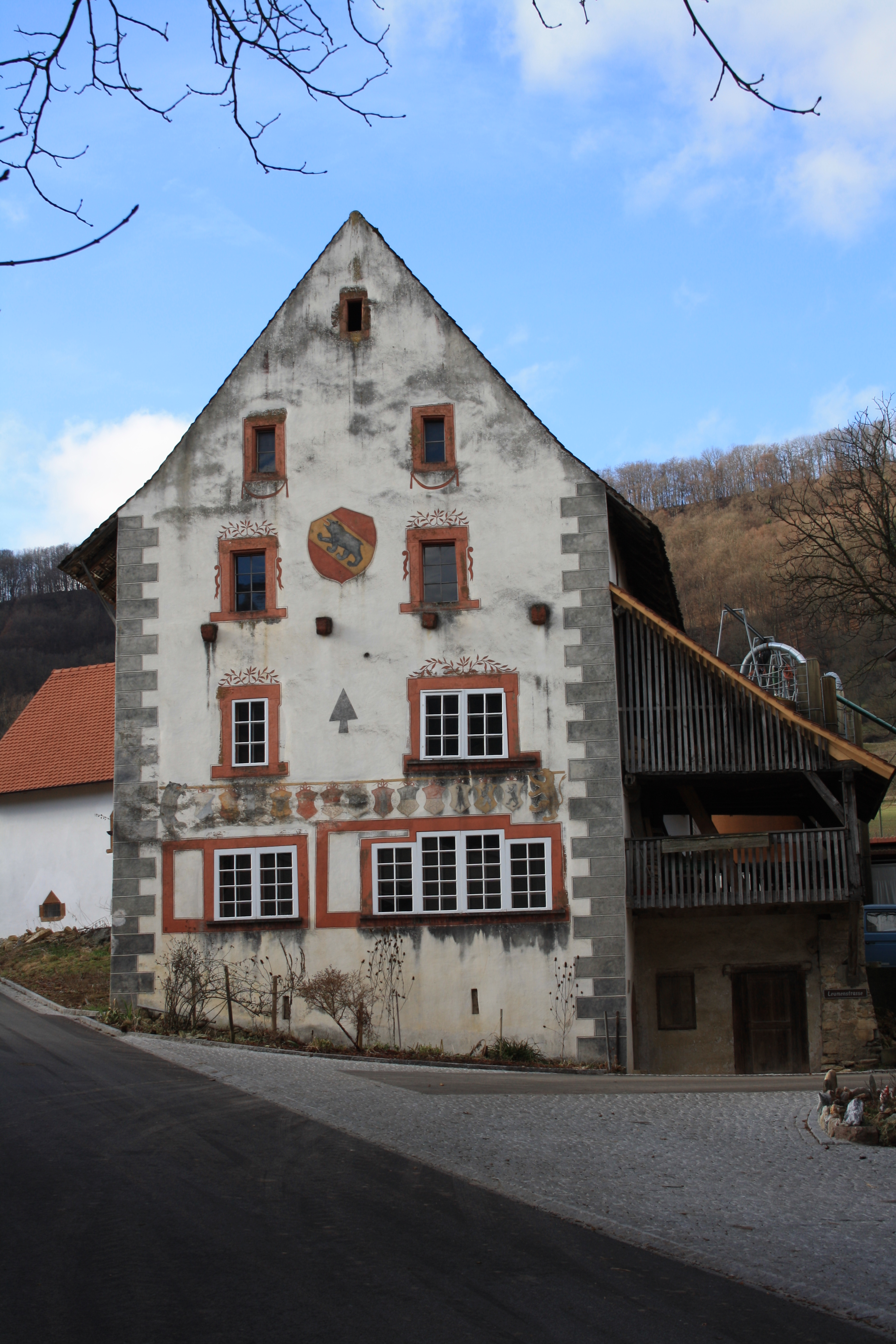
Hottwil

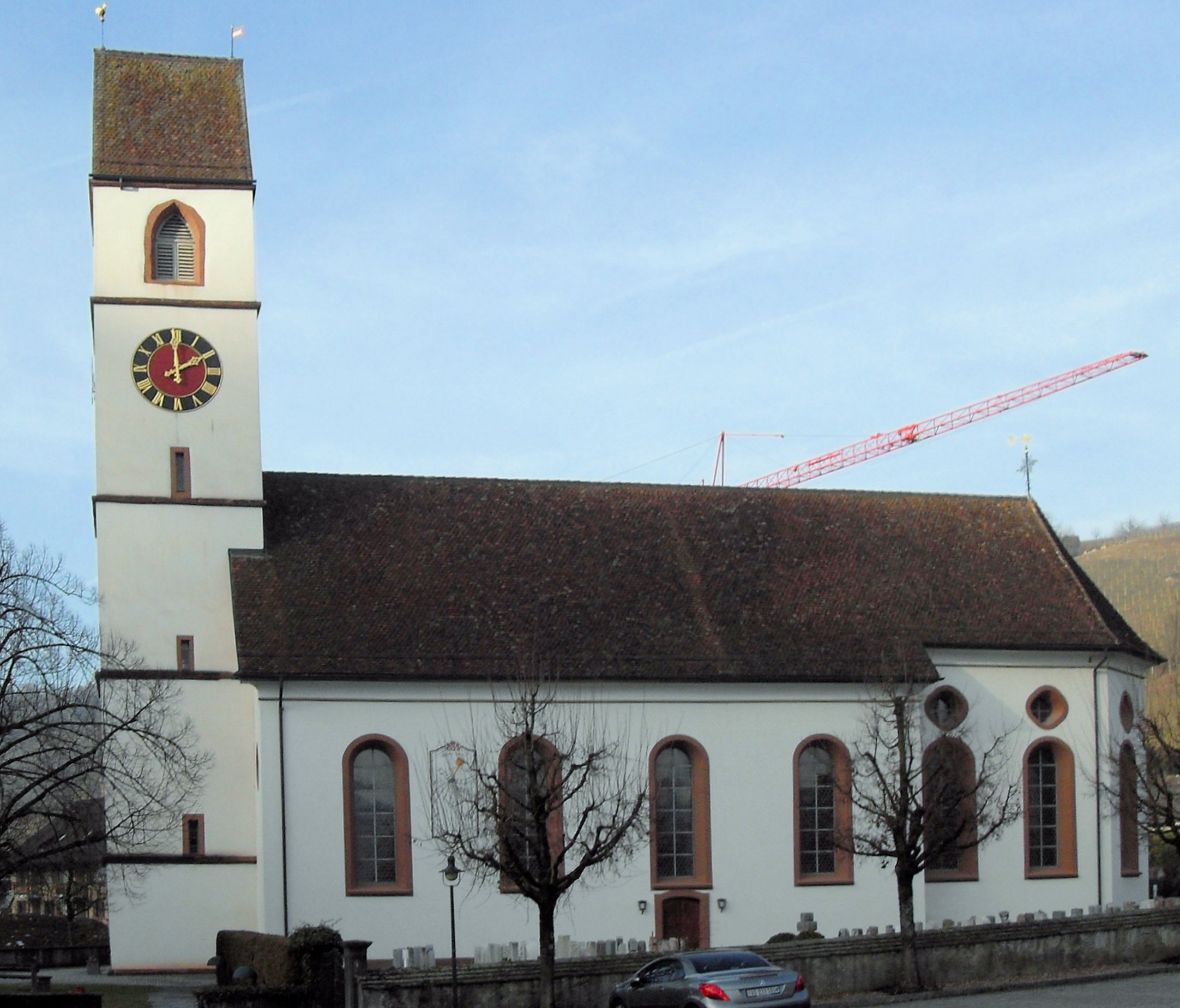
Catholic parish church in Mettau

The Hottwil, a former untervogtei residence with outbuildings and the catholic parish church in Mettau are listed as Swiss heritage sites of national significance.

== Economy ==
As of 2012, there were a total of 807 people employed in the municipality. Of these, a total of 150 people worked in 56 businesses in the primary economic sector. The secondary sector employed 361 workers in 41 separate businesses. Finally, the tertiary sector provided 296 jobs in 91 businesses. In 2013 a total of 8.9% of the population received social assistance.

== Politics ==
In the 2011 federal election the most popular party was the SVP with 41.5% of the vote. The next three most popular parties were the CVP (18.2%), the SP (13.0%) and the FDP (8.6%). In the federal election, a total of 732 votes were cast, and the voter turnout was 52.2%.

== Crime ==
In 2014 the crime rate, of the over 200 crimes listed in the Swiss Criminal Code (running from murder, robbery and assault to accepting bribes and election fraud), in Mettauertal was 13.6 per thousand residents. This rate is only 21.1% of the average rate in the entire country. During the same period, the rate of drug crimes was 4.2 per thousand residents, which is 42.4% of the national rate. The rate of violations of immigration, visa and work permit laws was 0 per thousand residents.
