= Bernau Castle =

Castle in Leibstadt, Switzerland

- Burg Bernau
- Leibstadt
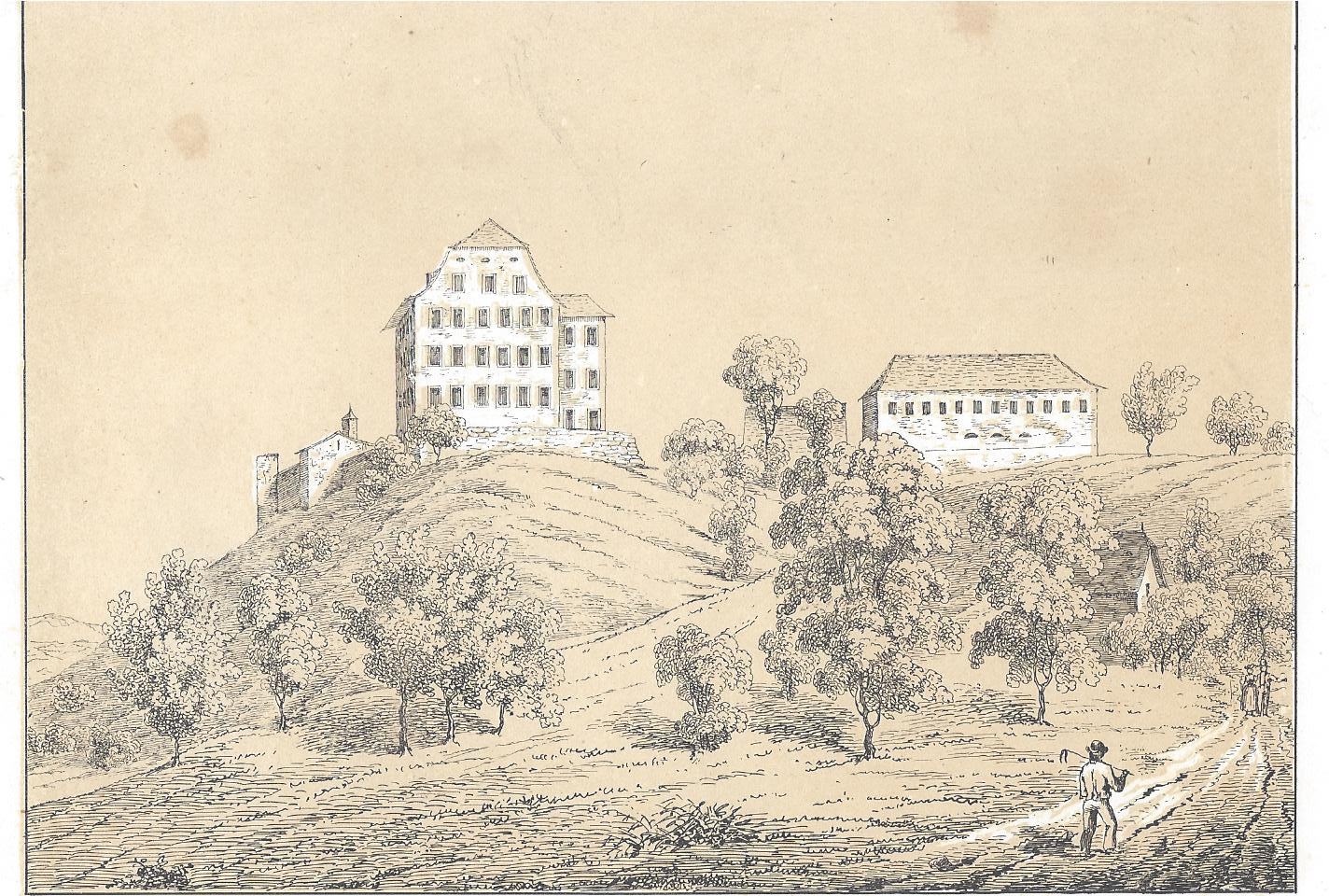
- Bernau Castle around 1840

Site information
- Type: hill castle
- Code: CH-AG
- Condition: ruin

Location
- Coordinates: 47°35′43″N 8°10′20″E

Site history
- Built: 1157

Bernau Castle is a ruined castle in the municipality of Leibstadt in the canton of Aargau in Switzerland. It was mostly destroyed in a fire in July 1844 leaving only a few ruined walls still visible.

== History ==
Bernau Castle and the nearby village of Bernau probably date back to the 11th century, though the earliest mention of Bernowa is in 1157. The noblemen Ulrich and Berchthold of Bernau appear in a document in 1299. In the 13th century it was inherited by the Gutenburg family and in 1379 it passed to the lords of Rinach. The Bernau estates included the high and low courts for Leibstadt, Gansingen and Schwaderloch.

After the Old Swiss Confederacy conquered the Aargau in 1415, Leibstadt sat on the border between the Swiss County of Baden and the Austrian district of Laufenburg. Following the peace treaty, the border ran through the bergfried of Bernau Castle and the owners served two masters. On 1 March 1499, during the Swabian War, the castle and town were attacked and burned. The castle and town were rebuilt soon thereafter.

The lords of Rinach sold Bernau in the 16th century to the Rotberg family. They in turn sold it in the early 1620s to the von Roll family from Uri. While the owner of the castle, Franz Ludwig von Roll became an Austrian baron on 26 February 1624. Franz Ludwig expanded the old castle building with a new four story single-wing residence with an attached staircase tower.

In 1764, the Baron Joseph Leopold von Roll von Bernau sunk his fortune into the production of fustian cloth. After the business failed he became insolvent. When his creditors attempted to sue him in Waldshut the bailiff determined that the living quarters of the Baron in Bernau Castle were actually in Swiss territory and that they should contact the bailiff in Baden.

During a typhus epidemic in 1814 Bernau Castle was used as a military hospital. After the epidemic it was sold and passed through several owners until it was divided up into apartments. Then, in 1844, the castle was destroyed in a fire. Today only the portions of the walls of the main tower and the residence wing are still visible.

== See also ==
- List of castles and fortresses in Switzerland

== Literature ==
- Hermann Josef Welti: Zwei Ahnenproben aus der Loretto-Kapelle, der Ruhestätte der Herren von Roll zu Bernau, 1931
- Hermann Josef Welti: Die Freiherren von Roll zu Bernau: Nach einem Vortrag, gehalten an der Jahresversammlung der Histor. Vereinigung Zurzach und Umgebung am 27. März 1935 in Leibstadt, Im Eigenverlag, 1935, 16 pages
- Robert Hilgers (Hrsg.): Ein dreistündiges Frühstück bei der Freifrau von Roll in: Die Deutschlandreise des Giovan Battista Nicolosi: erstmals aus seinem Handschriften herausgegeben, kommentiert und eingeleitet von Robert Hilgers. Schäuble, Rheinfelden/Berlin 1997, ISBN 3-87718-781-1. (A letter from Baden 29 January 1646, p. 120.)
