= Mettau =

Mettau may refer to:

- Mettau, Switzerland
- Metuje, a river in the Czech Republic
