= Leibstadt =

- Municipality
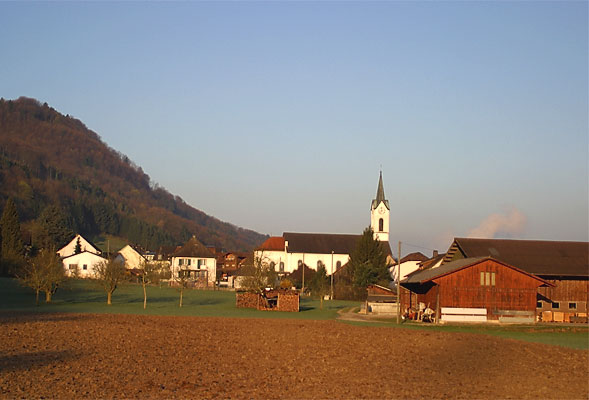
- Leibstadt village

- Flag Coat of arms
- Location of Leibstadt
- Location within Switzerland Location within Canton of Aargau
- Coordinates: 47°35′N 8°11′E
- Country: Switzerland
- Canton: Aargau
- District: Zurzach

Area
  - Total: 6.39 km^{2} (2.47 sq mi)
- Elevation: 347 m (1,138 ft)

Population (December 2005)
  - Total: 1,282
  - Density: 201/km^{2} (520/sq mi)
- Time zone: UTC+01:00 (CET)
  - Summer (DST): UTC+02:00 (CEST)
- Postal code: 5325
- SFOS number: 4311
- ISO 3166 code: CH-AG
- Surrounded by: Dogern (DE-BW), Full-Reuenthal, Leuggern, Schwaderloch, Wil
- Website: www.leibstadt.ch

Leibstadt is a municipality in the district of Zurzach in the canton of Aargau in Switzerland.

== History ==
Leibstadt is first mentioned about 1240 as Leibesteit. In the 13th and 14th Centuries it was ruled by the Habsburgs. In 1323 two mills are mentioned in Leibstadt. After the 1415 conquest of the Aargau, the two parts of the village (Oberleibstadt and Unterleibstadt, separated by a creek) were ruled separately by various overlords. The former was part of the Austrian district of Laufenburg, while the latter was part of the Swiss Confederation's district of Leuggern in the County of Baden. As a border village, Leibstadt was in danger any time the Habsburgs and the Confederation fought. A chronicle records that on 1 March 1499 men from Gansingen and Mettau attacked and burned most of the villages in the area, including Leibstadt. Between 1635 and 1798 the villages of Leibstadt and Schwaderloch formed the Roll'sche district of Bernau. Until 1816 Oberleibstadt belonged to the municipality of Leuggern and then formed its own political municipality (until 1832 it included Full-Reuenthal) within the Zurzach district. Unterleibstadt was an independent political municipality in the Laufenburg district. In 1866 the two municipalities merged to form Leibstadt and became part of the Zurzach district. The first school was founded in 1756 by the Knights order from Leuggern.

In 1880 Leibstadt resigned from the parish of Leuggern and formed their own Catholic parish (which included Schwaderloch between 1818 and 1953). The village chapel burned down in 1871 was replaced in 1879–80 with the present parish church.

A railway station was opened in Leibstadt in 1892, serving the Koblenz–Stein–Säckingen line. However, this closed in 1993 and only a Postauto bus travels to the municipality now. Into the latter half of the 20th century, agriculture was the main source of industry and income in Leibstadt. In 1973 the nuclear power company, Leibstadt AG, was founded to build a power plant in Leibstadt. The largest nuclear power plant in Switzerland, which cost about 4.8 billion CHF, came online in 1984. It produces about 7.2 billion kWh of electricity per year and provides about three-fifths of the jobs in the community.

== Geography ==
Aerial view (1949)

Leibstadt has an area, as of 2009, of 6.39 square kilometers (2.47 sq mi). Of this area, 2.79 km^{2} (1.08 sq mi) or 43.7% is used for agricultural purposes, while 2.18 km^{2} (0.84 sq mi) or 34.1% is forested. Of the rest of the land, 1.18 km^{2} (0.46 sq mi) or 18.5% is settled (buildings or roads), 0.22 km^{2} (0.085 sq mi) or 3.4% is either rivers or lakes.

Of the built up area, industrial buildings make up 2.3% of the total area while housing and buildings make up 5.2% and transportation infrastructure make up 5.6%. Power and water infrastructure as well as other special developed areas make up 5.2% of the area Out of the forested land, 32.4% of the total land area is heavily forested and 1.7% is covered with orchards or small clusters of trees. Of the agricultural land, 29.7% is used for growing crops and 11.6% is pastures, while 2.3% is used for orchards or vine crops. All the water in the municipality is flowing water.

The municipality is located in the Zurzach district, between the Wandfluh and Rhine rivers. It consists of the haufendorf village (an irregular, unplanned and quite closely packed village, built around a central square) of Leibstadt and the hamlet of Bernau. In 1866 the municipality was created when the formerly independent villages of Oberleibstadt and Unterleibstadt merged.

== Coat of arms ==
The blazon of the municipal coat of arms is Gules a Bend per bend Argent and Sable.

== Demographics ==
Leibstadt has a population (as of December 2020) of 1,404. As of 2008, 36.6% of the population are foreign nationals. Over the last 10 years (1997–2007) the population has changed at a rate of -2.4%. Most of the population (as of 2000) speaks German (84.7%), with Albanian being second most common (8.8%) and Italian being third (1.9%).

As of 2008, the gender distribution of the population was 50.4% male and 49.6% female. The population was made up of 456 Swiss men (34.8% of the population), and 205 (15.6%) non-Swiss men. There were 483 Swiss women (36.8%), and 168 (12.8%) non-Swiss women. In 2008 there were 7 live births to Swiss citizens and 9 births to non-Swiss citizens, and in same time span there were 8 deaths of Swiss citizens and non-Swiss citizen deaths. Ignoring immigration and emigration, the population of Swiss citizens decreased by 1 while the foreign population increased by 9. There were 17 non-Swiss men who emigrated from Switzerland to another country and 11 non-Swiss women who emigrated from Switzerland to another country. The total Swiss population change in 2008 was a decrease of 5 and the non-Swiss population change was an increase of 36 people. This represents a population growth rate of 2.4%.

The age distribution, as of 2008, in Leibstadt is; 137 children or 10.3% of the population are between 0 and 9 years old and 176 teenagers or 13.3% are between 10 and 19. Of the adult population, 193 people or 14.6% of the population are between 20 and 29 years old. 142 people or 10.7% are between 30 and 39, 212 people or 16.0% are between 40 and 49, and 198 people or 14.9% are between 50 and 59. The senior population distribution is 136 people or 10.3% of the population are between 60 and 69 years old, 70 people or 5.3% are between 70 and 79, there are 56 people or 4.2% who are between 80 and 89, and there are 5 people or 0.4% who are 90 and older.

As of 2000 the average number of residents per living room was 0.61 which is about equal to the cantonal average of 0.57 per room. In this case, a room is defined as space of a housing unit of at least 4 m^{2} (43 sq ft) as normal bedrooms, dining rooms, living rooms, kitchens and habitable cellars and attics. About 56.7% of the total households were owner occupied, or in other words did not pay rent (though they may have a mortgage or a rent-to-own agreement).

As of 2000, there were 39 homes with 1 or 2 persons in the household, 220 homes with 3 or 4 persons in the household, and 203 homes with 5 or more persons in the household. As of 2000, there were 475 private households (homes and apartments) in the municipality, and an average of 2.7 persons per household. In 2008 there were 212 single family homes (or 39.2% of the total) out of a total of 541 homes and apartments. There were a total of 9 empty apartments for a 1.7% vacancy rate. As of 2007, the construction rate of new housing units was 3.9 new units per 1000 residents.

In the 2007 federal election the most popular party was the SVP which received 62.66% of the vote. The next three most popular parties were the CVP (18.11%), the SP (7.6%) and the FDP (3.92%). In the federal election, a total of 419 votes were cast, and the voter turnout was 52.9%.

The historical population is given in the following table:

Historical population
| Year | Pop. | ±% |
|---|---|---|
| 1850 | 911 | — |
| 1900 | 838 | −8.0% |
| 1950 | 772 | −7.9% |
| 1980 | 1,150 | +49.0% |
| 1990 | 1,225 | +6.5% |
| 2000 | 1,298 | +6.0% |

== Sights ==
Leibstadt Nuclear Power Plant

It is known for Leibstadt Nuclear Power Plant.

The Looreto Chapel in Bernau was built in 1672. It was originally the castle chapel for a former noble family.

The ruins of Bernau Castle are near the municipality

== Economy ==
As of 2007, Leibstadt had an unemployment rate of 2.36%. As of 2005, there were 74 people employed in the primary economic sector and about 24 businesses involved in this sector. 581 people are employed in the secondary sector and there are 22 businesses in this sector. 267 people are employed in the tertiary sector, with 32 businesses in this sector. In 2000 there were 669 workers who lived in the municipality. Of these, 434 or about 64.9% of the residents worked outside Leibstadt while 479 people commuted into the municipality for work. There were a total of 714 jobs (of at least 6 hours per week) in the municipality. Of the working population, 12.3% used public transportation to get to work, and 48.8% used a private car.

== Religion ==
From the 2000 census, 773 or 59.6% were Roman Catholic, while 198 or 15.3% belonged to the Swiss Reformed Church. Of the rest of the population, there was 1 individual who belonged to the Christian Catholic faith.

== Education ==
In Leibstadt about 65.2% of the population (between age 25–64) have completed either non-mandatory upper secondary education or additional higher education (either university or a Fachhochschule). Of the school age population (in the 2008/2009 school year), there are 96 students attending primary school, there are 115 students attending secondary school in the municipality.

== Politics ==
In the 2011 federal election the most popular party was the SVP with 62.9% of the vote. The next three most popular parties were the CVP (12.4%), the SP (10.4%) and the FDP (4.6%). In the federal election, a total of 426 votes were cast, and the voter turnout was 56.1%.

== Crime ==
In 2014 the crime rate, of the over 200 crimes listed in the Swiss Criminal Code (running from murder, robbery and assault to accepting bribes and election fraud), in Leibstadt was 24.1 per thousand residents. This rate is only 47.7% of the cantonal rate and 37.3% of the average rate in the entire country. During the same period, the rate of drug crimes was 3.1 per thousand residents, which is only 31.3% of the national rate. The rate of violations of immigration, visa and work permit laws was 4.7 per thousand residents which is similar to the national rate of 5.2 per thousand.
