= Full-Reuenthal =

- Municipality
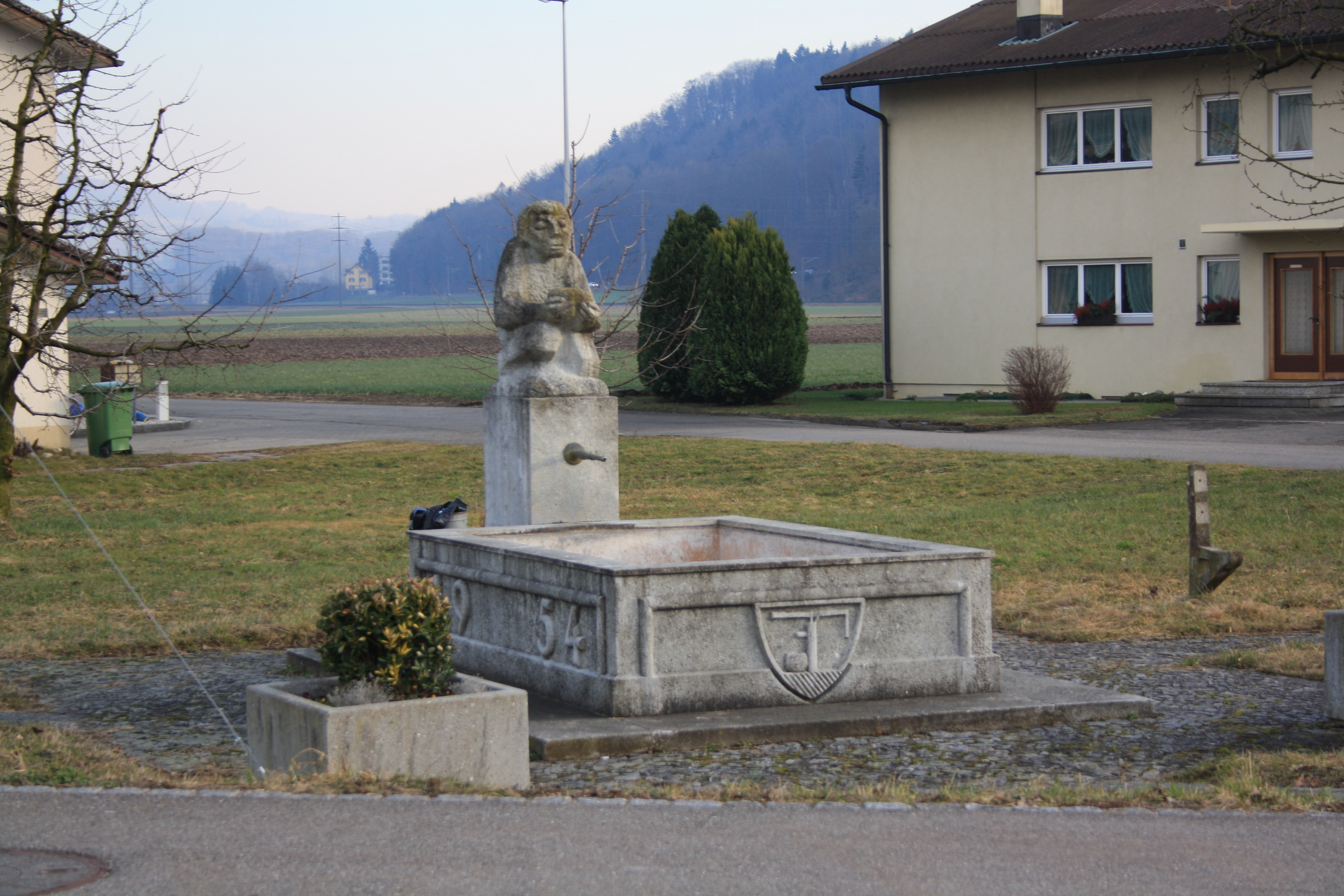

- Flag Coat of arms
- Location of Full-Reuenthal
- Location within Switzerland Location within Canton of Aargau
- Coordinates: 47°37′N 8°12′E
- Country: Switzerland
- Canton: Aargau
- District: Zurzach

Area
  - Total: 4.82 km^{2} (1.86 sq mi)
- Elevation: 315 m (1,033 ft)

Population (December 2003)
  - Total: 836
  - Density: 173/km^{2} (449/sq mi)
- Time zone: UTC+01:00 (CET)
  - Summer (DST): UTC+02:00 (CEST)
- Postal code: 5324
- SFOS number: 4307
- ISO 3166 code: CH-AG
- Surrounded by: Dogern (DE-BW), Leibstadt, Leuggern, Waldshut-Tiengen (DE-BW)
- Website: www.full-reuenthal.ch

Full-Reuenthal is a municipality in the district of Zurzach in the canton of Aargau in Switzerland.

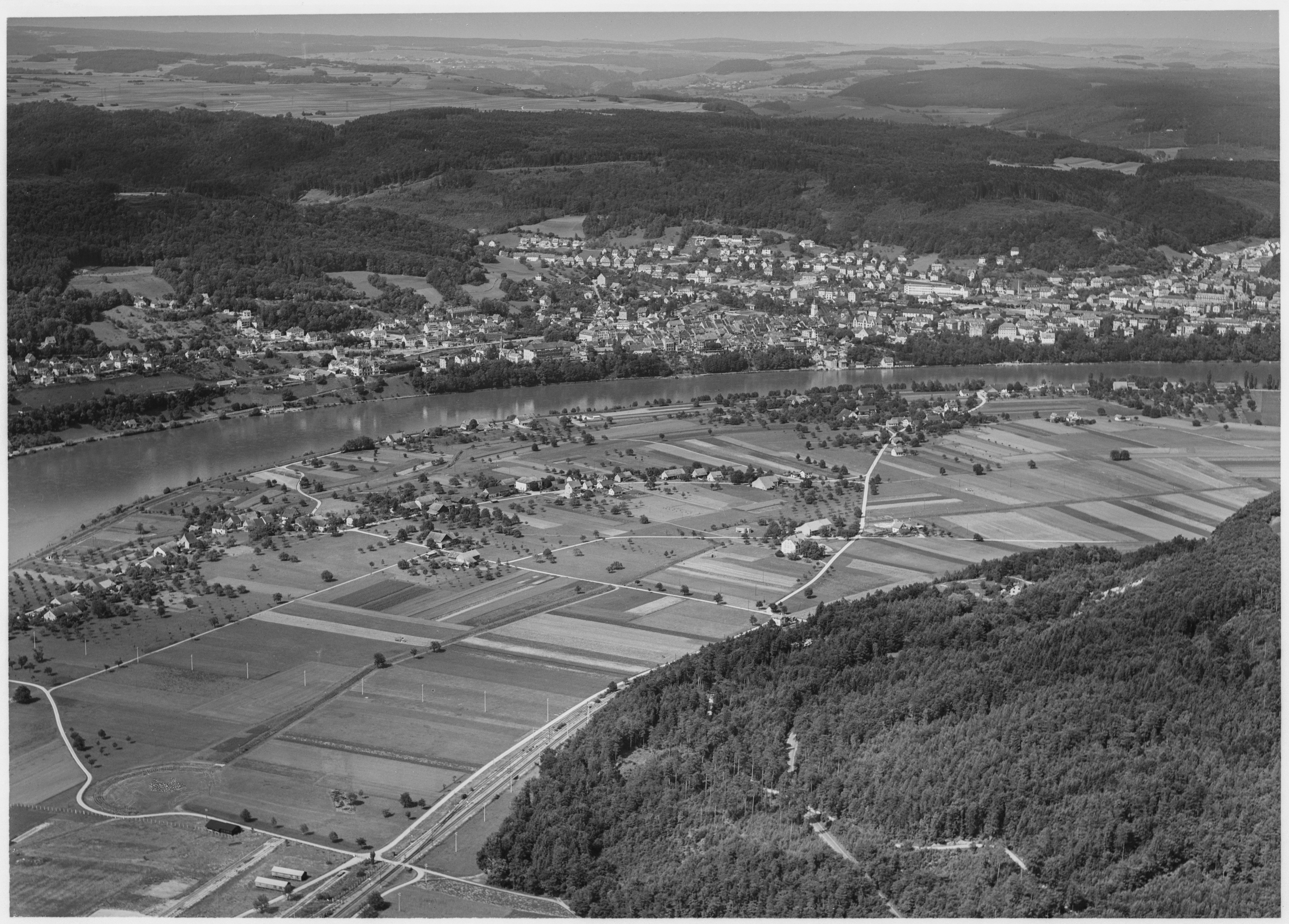
Aerial view (1953)

== History ==
Full is first mentioned around 1303-07 as Wulna, and Reuenthal was mentioned at the same time as Ruwental. Full-Reuenthal became a municipality in 1832, when it was separated from Oberleibstadt. In the beginning of the 2000s, extension of the German Bundesautobahn 98 through the area of Full was resisted by local inhabitants.

== Geography ==
Full-Reuenthal has an area, as of 2009, of 4.82 square kilometers (1.86 sq mi). Of this area, 2.6 km^{2} (1.0 sq mi) or 53.9% is used for agricultural purposes, while 1.08 km^{2} (0.42 sq mi) or 22.4% is forested. Of the rest of the land, 0.66 km^{2} (0.25 sq mi) or 13.7% is settled (buildings or roads), 0.52 km^{2} (0.20 sq mi) or 10.8% is either rivers or lakes.

Of the built up area, industrial buildings made up 2.5% of the total area while housing and buildings made up 5.4% and transportation infrastructure made up 4.4%. Power and water infrastructure as well as other special developed areas made up 1.5% of the area Out of the forested land, 20.7% of the total land area is heavily forested and 1.7% is covered with orchards or small clusters of trees. Of the agricultural land, 43.2% is used for growing crops and 8.7% is pastures, while 2.1% is used for orchards or vine crops. All the water in the municipality is flowing water.

The municipality is located in the Zurzach district, in a Rhine knee (bend in the Rhine River) across from the German city of Waldshut. It consists of the scattered village of Full with the sections of Unterdorf, Fahrhäuser and Jüppen and the haufendorf village (an irregular, unplanned and quite closely packed village, built around a central square) of Reuenthal. It lies near the confluence of the rivers Aare and Rhine. Full-Reuenthal is accessed by Hauptstrasse 7.

== Coat of arms ==
The blazon of the municipal coat of arms is Or a Water Pump Sable on a Base Vert.

== Demographics ==
Full-Reuenthal has a population (as of December 2020) of 883 As of June 2009, 10.9% of the population are foreign nationals. Over the last 10 years (1997–2007) the population has changed at a rate of 0.5%. Most of the population (as of 2000) speaks German(95.4%), with Italian being second most common ( 1.1%) and Portuguese being third ( 1.0%).

The age distribution, as of 2008, in Full-Reuenthal is; 99 children or 12.1% of the population are between 0 and 9 years old and 112 teenagers or 13.7% are between 10 and 19. Of the adult population, 73 people or 8.9% of the population are between 20 and 29 years old. 80 people or 9.8% are between 30 and 39, 158 people or 19.3% are between 40 and 49, and 125 people or 15.3% are between 50 and 59. The senior population distribution is 69 people or 8.4% of the population are between 60 and 69 years old, 62 people or 7.6% are between 70 and 79, there are 36 people or 4.4% who are between 80 and 89, and there are 4 people or 0.5% who are 90 and older.

As of 2000 the average number of residents per living room was 0.55 which is about equal to the cantonal average of 0.57 per room. In this case, a room is defined as space of a housing unit of at least 4 m^{2} (43 sq ft) as normal bedrooms, dining rooms, living rooms, kitchens and habitable cellars and attics. About 74.9% of the total households were owner occupied, or in other words did not pay rent (though they may have a mortgage or a rent-to-own agreement).

As of 2000, there were 8 homes with 1 or 2 persons in the household, 115 homes with 3 or 4 persons in the household, and 172 homes with 5 or more persons in the household. As of 2000, there were 299 private households (homes and apartments) in the municipality, and an average of 2.7 persons per household. In 2008 there were 202 single family homes (or 62.7% of the total) out of a total of 322 homes and apartments. There were a total of 0 empty apartments for a 0.0% vacancy rate. As of 2007, the construction rate of new housing units was 2.4 new units per 1000 residents.

In the 2007 federal election the most popular party was the SVP which received 47.45% of the vote. The next three most popular parties were the CVP (14.8%), the SP (13.1%) and the FDP (12.19%). In the federal election, a total of 277 votes were cast, and the voter turnout was 47.6%.

The historical population is given in the following table:

Historical population
Year	Pop.	±%
1850	442	—
1870	356	−19.5%
1900	404	+13.5%
1950	493	+22.0%
1990	735	+49.1%
2000	806	+9.7%

== Heritage sites of national significance ==
The Jüppe, a portion of the Roman era Rhine fortifications, is listed as a Swiss heritage site of national significance.

== Economy ==
As of 2007, Full-Reuenthal had an unemployment rate of 1.65%. As of 2005, there were 143 people employed in the primary economic sector and about 17 businesses involved in this sector. 47 people are employed in the secondary sector and there are 5 businesses in this sector. 60 people are employed in the tertiary sector, with 16 businesses in this sector.

In 2000 there were 381 workers who lived in the municipality. Of these, 296 or about 77.7% of the residents worked outside Full-Reuenthal while 175 people commuted into the municipality for work. There were a total of 260 jobs (of at least 6 hours per week) in the municipality. Of the working population, 12.6% used public transportation to get to work, and 55.6% used a private car.

The companies in the municipality includes Kuhn Champignon AG.

== Religion ==
From the 2000 census, 533 or 66.1% were Roman Catholic, while 182 or 22.6% belonged to the Swiss Reformed Church. Of the rest of the population, there were 2 individuals (or about 0.25% of the population) who belonged to the Christian Catholic faith.

== Education ==
The entire Swiss population is generally well educated. In Full-Reuenthal about 75.5% of the population (between age 25-64) have completed either non-mandatory upper secondary education or additional higher education (either university or a Fachhochschule). Of the school age population (in the 2008/2009 school year), there are 74 students attending primary school in the municipality.

== See also ==
- Schweizerisches Militärmuseum Full
