= Le Grand-Lemps =

- Commune
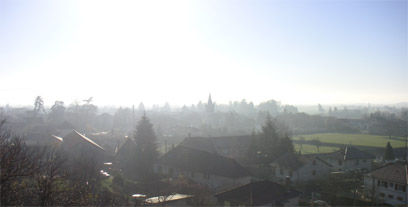
- A general view of Le Grand-Lemps

- Coat of arms
- Location of Le Grand-Lemps
- Location within France Location within Auvergne-Rhône-Alpes
- Coordinates: 45°23′57″N 5°25′14″E
- Country: France
- Region: Auvergne-Rhône-Alpes
- Department: Isère
- Arrondissement: La Tour-du-Pin
- Canton: Le Grand-Lemps
- Intercommunality: Bièvre Est

Government
  - Mayor (2020–2026): Geraldine Bardin-Rabatel
- Area^{1}: 12.9 km^{2} (5.0 sq mi)
- Elevation: 480 m (1,570 ft)
- Highest elevation: 724 m (2,375 ft)
- Lowest elevation: 434 m (1,424 ft)
- Population (2023): 3,083
  - Density: 239/km^{2} (619/sq mi)
- Time zone: UTC+01:00 (CET)
  - Summer (DST): UTC+02:00 (CEST)
- INSEE/Postal code: 38182 /38690
- ^{1} French Land Register data, which excludes lakes, ponds, glaciers > 1 km^{2} (0.386 sq mi or 247 acres) and river estuaries.

Le Grand-Lemps (French pronunciation: [lə grɑ̃ lɛ̃s]) is a commune in the Isère department in southeastern France.

== Geography ==
The area of the municipality is 1290 hectares (about 5 square miles). It is located at the edge of the plain of Bièvre (Beaver) river, halfway between Voiron and Saint-André-la-Côte.

The town is located on the axis between Rives, Isère and La Frette, Isère (RD73). The natural reserve of the pond Le Grand-Lemps is classified as européenne2 reserves. It is a natural area of ecological interest, flora and fauna which is (ZNIEFF) Type I/Zone No. 3800-7000.

== Early history ==
It is likely that the first tribes there, the Ligures, would have arrived and settled in the sixth century BC. Celtic Allobroges later came to mingle with the people. Around 120 BC began the Roman invasion of Gaul. A barbarian tribe the Burgundians later migrated to the area. In 486, Clovis I founded the kingdom of the Franks. After the victory in the Battle of Vézeronce in 524, the Franks claimed the region. In the later part of the sixth century there was the fragmentation of the land between the invaders and the beginning of feudalism. There was then a time of settlement of some Saracen hordes. This was followed by a less hectic period during the reign of Charlemagne, whose empire at his death in 843 was divided into three, leaving the geographic area under the domination of his grandson Lothair I.

== Population ==
Its residents are called Lempsiquois in French.

Historical population

Year	Pop.	±% p.a.
1793	1,781	—
1800	1,680	−0.83%
1806	1,797	+1.13%
1821	1,853	+0.20%
1831	1,856	+0.02%
1836	2,662	+7.48%
1841	2,115	−4.50%
1846	2,174	+0.55%
1851	2,220	+0.42%
1856	2,070	−1.39%
1861	2,065	−0.05%
1866	2,079	+0.14%
1872	1,984	−0.78%
1876	2,042	+0.72%
1881	2,083	+0.40%
1886	2,063	−0.19%
1891	1,941	−1.21%
1896	1,860	−0.85%
1901	1,848	−0.13%

Year	Pop.	±% p.a.
1906	1,841	−0.08%
1911	1,830	−0.12%
1921	1,737	−0.52%
1926	1,832	+1.07%
1931	2,014	+1.91%
1936	1,836	−1.83%
1946	1,657	−1.02%
1954	1,705	+0.36%
1962	1,759	+0.39%
1968	1,726	−0.32%
1975	1,986	+2.02%
1982	2,164	+1.23%
1990	2,364	+1.11%
1999	2,349	−0.07%
2007	2,892	+2.63%
2012	3,031	+0.94%
2017	3,094	+0.41%
2023	3,083	−0.06%

Source: EHESS and INSEE (1968-2023)

== Art ==
A beautiful mural is painted on the facade of the old blind "Castro house" at the western entrance of the city. It tells the story representing a local tavern whose sign is the "Green Fairy" because it produced absinthe. Painted characters are dressed in silk and woven locally in the foreground is represented as a rosebush growing roses is common in the plain of the Le Grand-Lemps.

Many artists have visited and spent significant lengths of time in Le Grand-Lemps over the years. The painter Pierre Bonnard and his family lived in Le Grand-Lemps, where he took inspiration and created artworks based on the area. The writer, poet and politician Alphonse de Lamartine, the writer Alfred Jarry, the composer Claude Terrasse, and the painter Édouard Vuillard have stayed for periods of time as well.

== Sights ==
- City Hall and City Hall Park
- Castle Square: it hosts a market every Tuesday and Friday mornings, as well as numerous events.
- Municipal halls: the multipurpose room "La Grange" (capacity 1000 people for a meal, a show for 400, 500 for sport), Foyer Municipal (capacity 200 people), Space "Pierre Bonnard" (capacity 100 persons ), the room "old Town Hall" (capacity 20 people).
- Sports facilities: Gymnasium multipurpose room for handball and basketball, the Municipal Stadium with two pitches for football and rugby, and two tennis courts.
- Its railway station, on the main line from Lyon to Grenoble, is the site of a "free library"

== Twin towns ==
Le Grand-Lemps is twinned with:

- Dogern, Germany, since 1988

== See also ==
- Communes of the Isère department
