= Laufenburg District =

Coordinates: 47°33′N 8°3′E

Laufenburg District Bezirk Laufenburg
- District
- Country: Switzerland
- Canton: Aargau
- Capital: Laufenburg

Area
  - Total: 125.57 km^{2} (48.48 sq mi)

Population (2020)
  - Total: 33,279
  - Density: 265.02/km^{2} (686.41/sq mi)
- Time zone: UTC+1 (CET)
  - Summer (DST): UTC+2 (CEST)
- Municipalities: 17

Laufenburg District is a district of the canton of Aargau, Switzerland, essentially consisting of the upper Fricktal valley in the Aargau Jura Mountains south of the Rhine. Its capital is the town of Laufenburg. It has a population of 33,279 (as of 31 December 2020).

== Geography ==
The Laufenburg district has an area, as of 2009, of 152.56 square kilometers (58.90 sq mi). Of this area, 75.05 km^{2} (28.98 sq mi) or 49.2% is used for agricultural purposes, while 59.85 km^{2} (23.11 sq mi) or 39.2% is forested. Of the rest of the land, 15.9 km^{2} (6.1 sq mi) or 10.4% is settled (buildings or roads).

== Demographics ==
The Laufenburg district has a population (as of December 2020) of 33,279. As of June 2009, 15.6% of the population are foreign nationals.

== Economy ==
In 2000 there were 13,183 workers who lived in the district. Of these, 9,714 or about 73.7% of the residents worked outside the district while 5,635 people commuted into the district for work. There were a total of 9,104 jobs (of at least 6 hours per week) in the district.

== Religion ==
From the 2000 census, 15,302 or 59.4% were Roman Catholic, while 5,752 or 22.3% belonged to the Swiss Reformed Church. Of the rest of the population, there were 128 individuals (or about 0.50% of the population) who belonged to the Christian Catholic faith.

== Education ==
Of the school age population (in the 2008/2009 school year), there are 2,224 students attending primary school, there are 821 students attending secondary school, there are 555 students attending tertiary or university level schooling in the municipality.

== Municipalities ==
Coat of arms	Municipality	Population (31 December 2020)	Area, km^{2}
Böztal	Böztal		22.30
Eiken	Eiken	2,331	7.07
Frick	Frick	5,629	9.96
Gansingen	Gansingen	1,066	8.77
Gipf-Oberfrick	Gipf-Oberfrick	3,731	10.17
Herznach-Ueken	Herznach-Ueken		11.37
Kaisten	Kaisten	2,754	18.11^{b}
Laufenburg	Laufenburg	3,659	14.49^{c}
Mettauertal	Mettauertal	2,067	21.56^{a}
Münchwilen	Münchwilen	1,007	2.47
Oberhof	Oberhof	570	8.20
Oeschgen	Oeschgen	1,049	4.38
Schwaderloch	Schwaderloch	689	2.77
Sisseln	Sisseln	1,661	2.52
Wittnau	Wittnau	1,365	11.25
Wölflinswil	Wölflinswil	1,033	9.51
Zeihen	Zeihen	1,170	6.87
Total		33,279	152.56

^a Includes area of Hottwil, Etzgen, Mettau, Oberhofen and Wil which merged into Mettauertal on 1 January 2010.
^b Includes area of Ittenthal which merged into Kaisten on 1 January 2010.
^c Includes area of Sulz which merged into Laufenburg on 1 January 2010.

=== Mergers ===
The following changes to the district's municipalities have occurred since 2000:

- On 1 January 2010 the municipalities of Hottwil in the Brugg district and Etzgen, Mettau, Oberhofen and Wil in the Laufenburg district merged to form the new municipality of Mettauertal. This resulted in Hottwil transferring from Brugg to Laufenburg. At the same time the municipality of Ittenthal merged into Kaisten, and Sulz merged into Laufenburg.
- On 1 January 2022 the municipalities of Bözen, Effingen and Elfingen in the Brugg district and Hornussen in the Laufenburg district merged to form the new municipality of Böztal.
- On 1 January 2023 the municipalities of Herznach and Ueken merged to form the new municipality of Herznach-Ueken.
