= Oeschgen =

- Municipality
- Flag Coat of arms
- Location of Oeschgen
- Location within Switzerland Location within Canton of Aargau
- Coordinates: 47°31′N 8°1′E
- Country: Switzerland
- Canton: Aargau
- District: Laufenburg

Area
  - Total: 4.38 km^{2} (1.69 sq mi)
- Elevation: 342 m (1,122 ft)

Population (December 2006)
  - Total: 867
  - Density: 198/km^{2} (513/sq mi)
- Time zone: UTC+01:00 (CET)
  - Summer (DST): UTC+02:00 (CEST)
- Postal code: 5072
- SFOS number: 4175
- ISO 3166 code: CH-AG
- Surrounded by: Eiken, Frick, Kaisten
- Website: oeschgen.ch

Oeschgen is a municipality in the district of Laufenburg in the canton of Aargau in Switzerland.

== History ==
Aerial view (1954)

The earliest traces of human settlement include several individual Stone Age items, and evidence of Bronze Age and Roman era settlements. Modern Oeschgen is first mentioned in 1234 as Escecon. In 1242 it was mentioned as Eschincon.

The village was first owned by the Lords of Eschkon from the 13th to 15th centuries. They were vassals of Rheinfelden and occasionally the Habsburgs. From the mid-14th century until 1797, Oeschgen was part of the Austrian-Habsburg District of Laufenburg. In 1803 it was part of the Canton of Fricktal when it joined the new Canton of Aargau. The rights to low justice were held by the Lords of Grünenberg, then from 1475 until 1797 by the Lords of Schönau. In 1597-98 the Lords of Schönau built a manor house in the village. This manor later became the municipal administration building and was renovated between 1971 and 1975. In the Second World War an internment camp for Polish soldiers was built near the village.

The Lords of Schönau held the patronage right of the church of St. Cosmas and St. Damian. The church was probably from the late 12th century and a new building was built in 1912.

Until the 19th century the major sources of income were viticulture and grain. By the start of the 21st century Oeschgen had become mostly residential, with some small businesses. Most of the workers commute to the agglomeration of Basel and into Frick.

== Geography ==
Oeschgen has an area, as of 2009, of 4.38 square kilometers (1.69 sq mi). Of this area, 2.95 km^{2} (1.14 sq mi) or 67.4% is used for agricultural purposes, while 0.8 km^{2} (0.31 sq mi) or 18.3% is forested. Of the rest of the land, 0.62 km^{2} (0.24 sq mi) or 14.2% is settled (buildings or roads), 0.03 km^{2} (7.4 acres) or 0.7% is either rivers or lakes and 0.01 km^{2} (2.5 acres) or 0.2% is unproductive land.

Of the built up area, housing and buildings made up 6.2% and transportation infrastructure made up 6.8%. Out of the forested land, 17.1% of the total land area is heavily forested and 1.1% is covered with orchards or small clusters of trees. Of the agricultural land, 37.7% is used for growing crops and 25.6% is pastures, while 4.1% is used for orchards or vine crops. All the water in the municipality is in rivers and streams.

The municipality is located in the Laufenburg district, in the upper Fricktal (Frick river valley). It lies along the Sisselnbach and on the A3 motorway. It consists of the haufendorf village (an irregular, unplanned and quite closely packed village, built around a central square) of Oeschgen.

== Coat of arms ==
The blazon of the municipal coat of arms is Per fess Sable and Or three Annulets counterchanged.

== Demographics ==
Oeschgen has a population (as of December 2020) of 1,049. As of June 2009, 12.2% of the population are foreign nationals. Over the last 10 years (1997–2007) the population has changed at a rate of 10.8%. Most of the population (as of 2000) speaks German (93.4%), with Italian being second most common ( 2.3%) and Albanian being third ( 1.5%).

The age distribution, as of 2008, in Oeschgen is; 106 children or 11.6% of the population are between 0 and 9 years old and 117 teenagers or 12.8% are between 10 and 19. Of the adult population, 99 people or 10.8% of the population are between 20 and 29 years old. 122 people or 13.3% are between 30 and 39, 170 people or 18.6% are between 40 and 49, and 116 people or 12.7% are between 50 and 59. The senior population distribution is 104 people or 11.4% of the population are between 60 and 69 years old, 51 people or 5.6% are between 70 and 79, there are 21 people or 2.3% who are between 80 and 89, and there are 8 people or 0.9% who are 90 and older.

As of 2000 the average number of residents per living room was 0.57 which is about equal to the cantonal average of 0.57 per room. In this case, a room is defined as space of a housing unit of at least 4 m^{2} (43 sq ft) as normal bedrooms, dining rooms, living rooms, kitchens and habitable cellars and attics. About 66.2% of the total households were owner occupied, or in other words did not pay rent (though they may have a mortgage or a rent-to-own agreement).

As of 2000, there were 19 homes with 1 or 2 persons in the household, 124 homes with 3 or 4 persons in the household, and 144 homes with 5 or more persons in the household. As of 2000, there were 305 private households (homes and apartments) in the municipality, and an average of 2.6 persons per household. In 2008 there were 200 single family homes (or 57.5% of the total) out of a total of 348 homes and apartments. There were a total of 2 empty apartments for a 0.6% vacancy rate. As of 2007, the construction rate of new housing units was 1.2 new units per 1000 residents.

In the 2007 federal election the most popular party was the SVP which received 41.2% of the vote. The next three most popular parties were the CVP (24.5%), the SP (11.5%) and the FDP (6.7%).

In Oeschgen about 71.8% of the population (between age 25–64) have completed either non-mandatory upper secondary education or additional higher education (either university or a Fachhochschule). Of the school age population (in the 2008/2009 school year), there are 76 students attending primary school in the municipality.

The historical population is given in the following table:

Historical population
Year	Pop.	±%
1788	389	—
1850	604	+55.3%
1900	392	−35.1%
1950	472	+20.4%
2000	798	+69.1%

== Economy ==
As of 2007, Oeschgen had an unemployment rate of 1.03%. As of 2005, there were 58 people employed in the primary economic sector and about 19 businesses involved in this sector. 31 people are employed in the secondary sector and there are 11 businesses in this sector. 127 people are employed in the tertiary sector, with 30 businesses in this sector.

In 2000 there were 416 workers who lived in the municipality. Of these, 338 or about 81.3% of the residents worked outside Oeschgen while 35 people commuted into the municipality for work. There were a total of 113 jobs (of at least 6 hours per week) in the municipality. Of the working population, 8.9% used public transportation to get to work, and 52.7% used a private car.

== Religion ==
From the 2000 census, 516 or 64.7% were Roman Catholic, while 165 or 20.7% belonged to the Swiss Reformed Church. Of the rest of the population, there were 3 individuals (or about 0.38% of the population) who belonged to the Christian Catholic faith.
