= Sulz, Aargau =

Sulz
- Former municipality
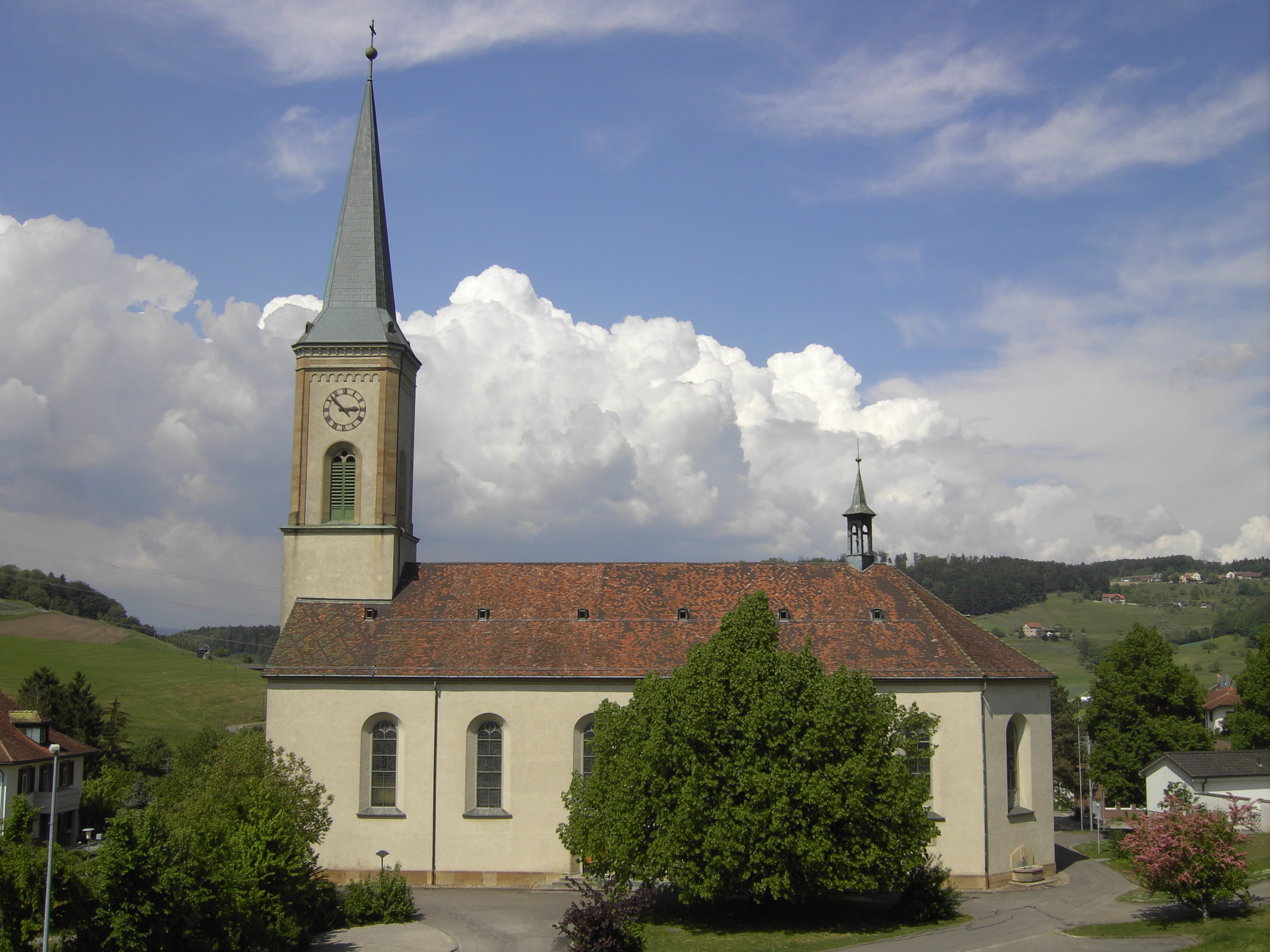

- Flag Coat of arms
- Location of Sulz
- Location within Switzerland Location within Canton of Aargau
- Coordinates: 47°32′N 8°6′E
- Country: Switzerland
- Canton: Aargau
- District: Laufenburg

Area
  - Total: 12.21 km^{2} (4.71 sq mi)
- Elevation: 381 m (1,250 ft)

Population (December 2006)
  - Total: 1,155
  - Density: 94.59/km^{2} (245.0/sq mi)
- Time zone: UTC+01:00 (CET)
  - Summer (DST): UTC+02:00 (CEST)
- Postal code: 5085
- SFOS number: 4178
- ISO 3166 code: CH-AG
- Surrounded by: Elfingen, Etzgen, Gansingen, Hornussen, Ittenthal, Kaisten, Laufenburg (DE-BW), Laufenburg, Mönthal, Oberhofen
- Website: www.sulz.ch

Sulz (German pronunciation: [zʊlts]) is currently a village and was a municipality in the district of Laufenburg in the canton of Aargau in Switzerland. The late Roman watchtower in Rheinsulz is listed as a heritage site of national significance. On 1 January 2010 the municipality of Sulz merged into Laufenburg.
