= Hottwil =

- Former municipality
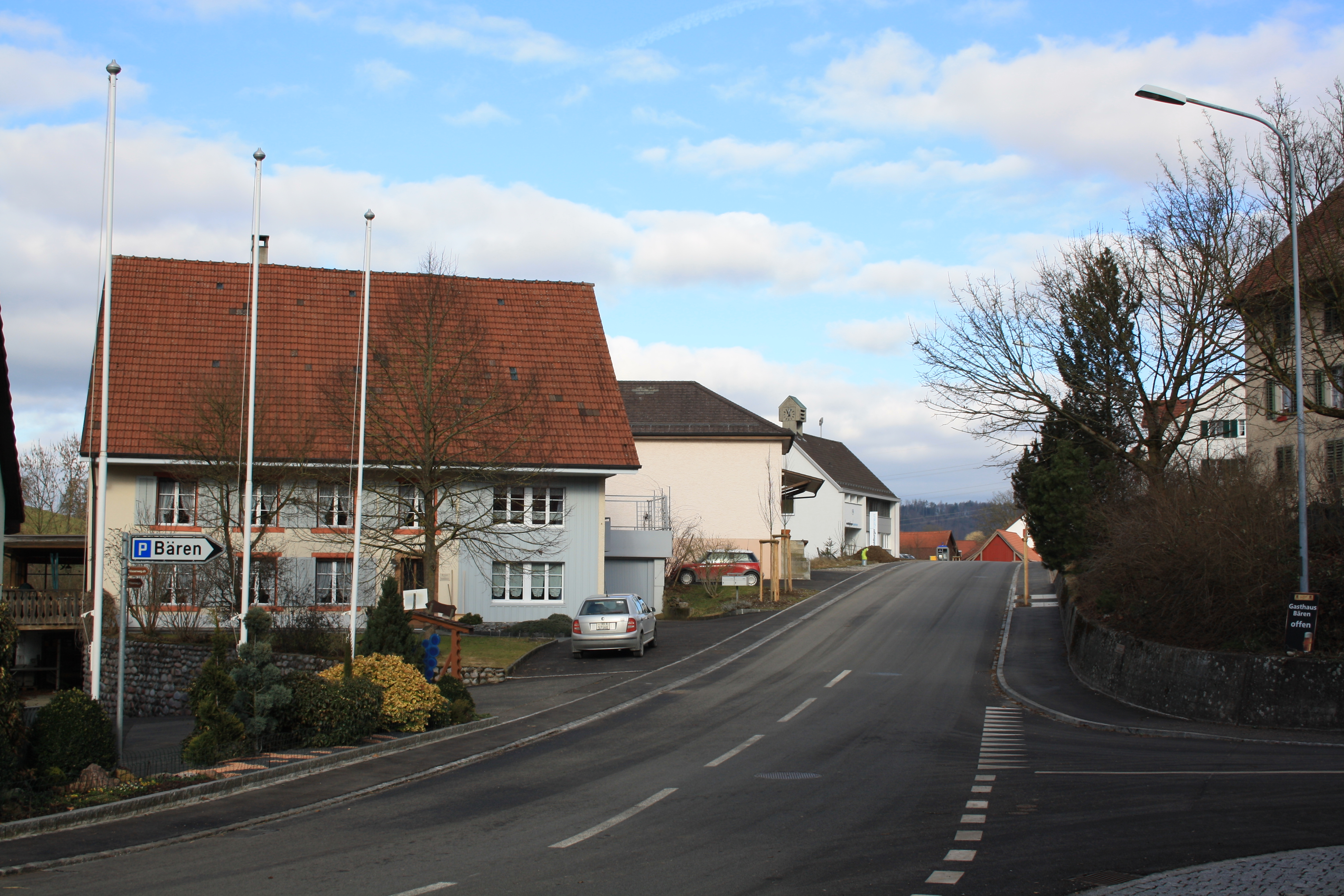

- Flag Coat of arms
- Location of Hottwil
- Location within Switzerland Location within Canton of Aargau
- Coordinates: 47°33′N 8°10′E
- Country: Switzerland
- Canton: Aargau
- District: Brugg

Area
  - Total: 4.16 km^{2} (1.61 sq mi)
- Elevation: 415 m (1,362 ft)

Population (December 2006)
  - Total: 262
  - Density: 63.0/km^{2} (163/sq mi)
- Time zone: UTC+01:00 (CET)
  - Summer (DST): UTC+02:00 (CEST)
- Postal code: 5277
- SFOS number: 4101
- ISO 3166 code: CH-AG
- Surrounded by: Gansingen, Mandach, Remigen, Villigen, Wil
- Website: www.hottwil.ch

Hottwil was a municipality in the district of Brugg in canton of Aargau in Switzerland. On 1 January 2010 the municipalities of Hottwil, Etzgen, Mettau, Oberhofen and Wil merged to form the new municipality of Mettauertal. This resulted in Hottwil transferring from the Brugg to the Laufenburg district.
