= Oberhofen, Aargau =

Oberhofen
- Former municipality
- Flag Coat of arms
- Location of Oberhofen
- Location within Switzerland Location within Canton of Aargau
- Coordinates: 47°33′N 8°8′E
- Country: Switzerland
- Canton: Aargau
- District: Laufenburg

Area
  - Total: 3.12 km^{2} (1.20 sq mi)
- Elevation: 364 m (1,194 ft)

Population (December 2006)
  - Total: 291
  - Density: 93.3/km^{2} (242/sq mi)
- Time zone: UTC+01:00 (CET)
  - Summer (DST): UTC+02:00 (CEST)
- Postal code: 5273
- SFOS number: 4174
- ISO 3166 code: CH-AG
- Surrounded by: Etzgen, Gansingen, Mettau, Sulz, Wil
- Website: www.oberhofen-ag.ch

Oberhofen was a municipality in the district of Laufenburg in the canton of Aargau in Switzerland. On 1 January 2010 the municipalities of Hottwil, Etzgen, Mettau, Oberhofen and Wil merged into the municipality of Mettauertal.
