= Wil, Aargau =

Wil
- Former municipality
- Flag Coat of arms
- Location of Wil
- Location within Switzerland Location within Canton of Aargau
- Coordinates: 47°34′N 8°9′E
- Country: Switzerland
- Canton: Aargau
- District: Laufenburg

Area
  - Total: 7.71 km^{2} (2.98 sq mi)
- Elevation: 381 m (1,250 ft)

Population (December 2006)
  - Total: 669
  - Density: 86.8/km^{2} (225/sq mi)
- Time zone: UTC+01:00 (CET)
  - Summer (DST): UTC+02:00 (CEST)
- Postal code: 5276
- SFOS number: 4180
- ISO 3166 code: CH-AG
- Surrounded by: Gansingen, Hottwil, Leibstadt, Leuggern, Mandach, Mettau, Oberhofen, Schwaderloch
- Website: www.wil-ag.ch

Wil was a municipality in the district of Laufenburg in the canton of Aargau in Switzerland. The municipality is located in the north-east of the Fricktal region, about 3 km from the border to Germany. On 1 January 2010 the municipalities of Hottwil, Etzgen, Mettau, Oberhofen and Wil merged into the municipality of Mettauertal.

Aerial view (1958)

== Population ==
Current population is 669 inhabitants.

| Year | Population |
|---|---|
| 1850 | 739 |
| 1900 | 521 |
| 1930 | 522 |
| 1950 | 533 |
| 1960 | 558 |
| 1970 | 539 |
| 1980 | 530 |
| 1990 | 566 |
| 2000 | 666 |
| 2006 | 669 |
