= Etzgen =

- Former municipality
- Flag Coat of arms
- Location of Etzgen
- Location within Switzerland Location within Canton of Aargau
- Coordinates: 47°34′N 8°7′E
- Country: Switzerland
- Canton: Aargau
- District: Laufenburg

Area
  - Total: 3.28 km^{2} (1.27 sq mi)
- Elevation: 336 m (1,102 ft)

Population (December 2006)
  - Total: 438
  - Density: 134/km^{2} (346/sq mi)
- Time zone: UTC+01:00 (CET)
  - Summer (DST): UTC+02:00 (CEST)
- Postal code: 5275
- SFOS number: 4162
- ISO 3166 code: CH-AG
- Surrounded by: Albbruck (DE-BW), Laufenburg (DE-BW), Mettau, Oberhofen, Schwaderloch, Sulz
- Website: www.etzgen.ch

Etzgen was a municipality in the district of Laufenburg in the canton of Aargau in Switzerland. On 1 January 2010, the municipalities of Hottwil, Etzgen, Mettau, Oberhofen AG and Wil AG merged into the municipality of Mettauertal.

Aerial view (1953)

== Economy ==
In 2000 (before the merger), there were 163 workers who lived in the municipality. Of these, 119 or about 73.0% of the residents worked outside Etzgen while 112 people commuted into the municipality for work. There were a total of 156 jobs (of at least six hours per week) in the municipality.
