= Leuggern =

- Municipality
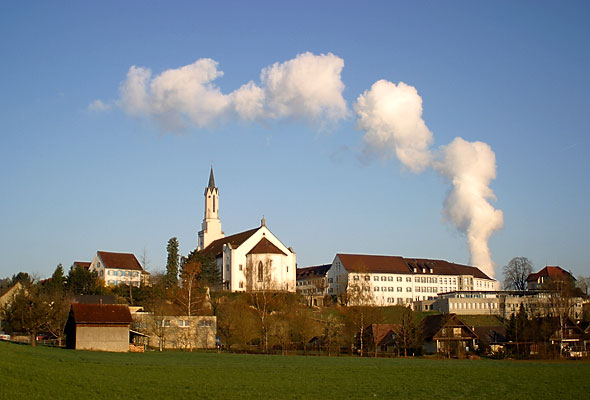
- Leuggern village

- Flag Coat of arms
- Location of Leuggern
- Location within Switzerland Location within Canton of Aargau
- Coordinates: 47°35′N 8°13′E
- Country: Switzerland
- Canton: Aargau
- District: Zurzach

Area
  - Total: 13.76 km^{2} (5.31 sq mi)
- Elevation: 332 m (1,089 ft)

Population (December 2005)
  - Total: 2,102
  - Density: 152.8/km^{2} (395.7/sq mi)
- Time zone: UTC+01:00 (CET)
  - Summer (DST): UTC+02:00 (CEST)
- Postal code: 5316
- SFOS number: 4313
- ISO 3166 code: CH-AG
- Surrounded by: Böttstein, Full-Reuenthal, Klingnau, Koblenz, Leibstadt, Mandach, Waldshut-Tiengen (DE-BW), Wil
- Website: www.leuggern.ch

Leuggern is a municipality in the district of Zurzach in the canton of Aargau in Switzerland.

== History ==
Aerial view (1949)

The remains of a Roman era Rhine fortifications watchtower have been discovered in Felsenau. The modern municipality of Leuggern is first mentioned in 1231 as Lutgern. In the 13th century it was part of the Habsburgs Waldshut district. Starting in the 14th century, it was a district under the Habsburg Vogt of Baden. After the conquest of Aargau in 1415 it was part of the Swiss Confederation controlled County of Baden. The major landholders were the Freiherr of Böttstein and the Freiherr of Bernau. The Freiherr of Bernau granted the Knights Hospitaller extensive property, which became the Commandry of Leuggern in 1248.

The village church is first mentioned in 1231 when it was in the possession of the knights. They also possessed other properties that they, Count Rudolf von Habsburg and, after 1239, Ulrich of Klingen were unsuccessfully fighting over. Initially their Commandry was based on Bubikon but began moving to Leuggern in 1248. By 1251, a monastery had been built. In 1257 seven monks are mentioned as living there. In 1268 the Commander moved his seat from Klingnau and managed both Commandry together until 1415 from there. It had extensive landholdings and was one of the best endowed Commandry in Upper Germany. The Grand Master merged the two Commandry together into a single unit, though each house had its own prior. The house at Leuggern was located in the diocese of Basel, while Klingnau was in the diocese of Constance.

The conquest of Aargau in 1415 brought the two religious houses under the vogt of the Acht Orte of the Swiss Confederation. Among the important priors in Leuggern was Franz von Sonnenberg of Lucerne, whose 1678 coat of arms adorns the gatehouse. Leuggern remained in the possession of the Order until 1806. At that time the Commandry building and property went to the Canton of Aargau. The building came into private hands in 1819 and in 1895 it served as a hospital for the elderly and sick. It was a forerunner of the District Hospital which opened in 1897.

The parish of Leuggern was essentially identical with the Amt of Leuggern and until 1816 with the municipality of Greater Leuggern. In 1816 the village of Böttstein and Oberleibstadt separated from Greater Leuggern to form independent municipalities. However, the Catholic parish remained the same size until 1880, when the parish of Oberleibstadt separated. The neo-classical-Gothic Revival village church was built in 1851–53 by Caspar Joseph Jeuch. built. Until 1971, within the political municipality of Leuggern, there were five different Bürgergemeinden that held separate meetings over their infrastructure tasks. The district school was built in 1864.

The Aare River often overran its banks and flooded the village of Gippingen and the adjacent farmland until 1887–1904 when the Aare River correction changed its course. Between 1931 and 1935 a dam was built over the Aare between Leuggern and Klingnau for the hydroelectric power plant at Klingnau. The ferries in Kleindöttingen and Felsenau were replaced by bridges in 1892 and 1935. In 1926, a Postauto route was set up to Döttingen.

By 1900, viticulture had disappeared completely from the municipality. In 1899 a gypsum factory and mine were established in Felsenau. The factory produced plaster until 1960 and gypsum plasterboard until 1989. The largest employer at the beginning of the 21st century, the hospital district, opened in 1897 (and since 1971 has been a Regional Hospital). In 2000, the services sector, provided almost two thirds of jobs in the community.

== Geography ==
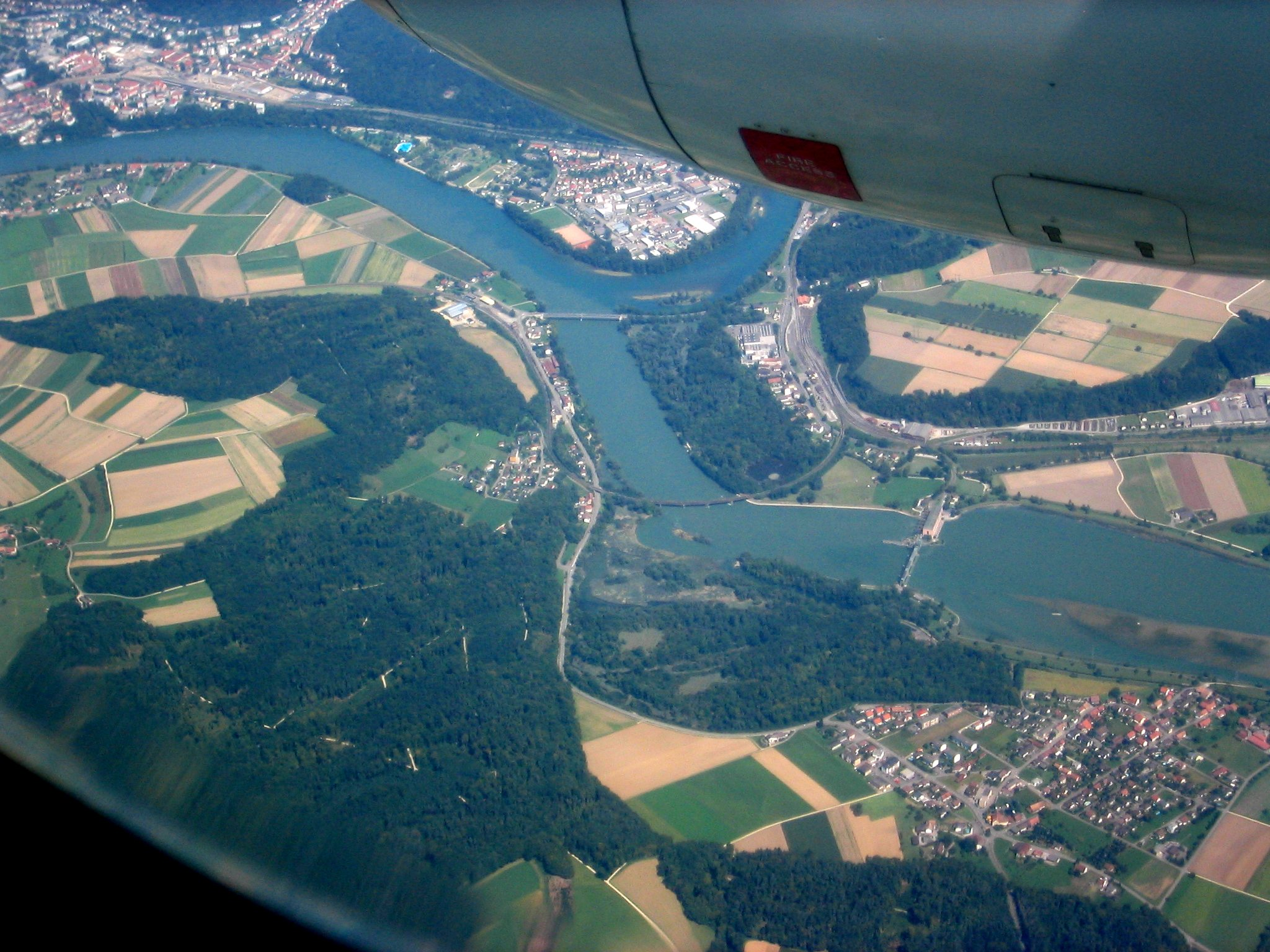
Aerial view of the confluence of Aar and Rhine with Felsenau (left of center) and Gippingen (lower right)

The municipality is located in the Zurzach district, on the western side of the Aare river. It consists of the villages of Leuggern, Gippingen, Hettenschwil and Etzwiland as well as the hamlets of Felsenau, Hagenfirst, Fehrental and Schlatt.

Leuggern has an area, as of 2009, of 13.76 square kilometers (5.31 sq mi). Of this area, 6.51 km^{2} (2.51 sq mi) or 47.3% is used for agricultural purposes, while 5.1 km^{2} (2.0 sq mi) or 37.1% is forested. Of the rest of the land, 1.25 km^{2} (0.48 sq mi) or 9.1% is settled (buildings or roads), 0.84 km^{2} (0.32 sq mi) or 6.1% is either rivers or lakes and 0.03 km^{2} (7.4 acres) or 0.2% is unproductive land.

Of the built up area, housing and buildings made up 4.5% and transportation infrastructure made up 3.3%. Out of the forested land, all of the forested land area is covered with heavy forests. Of the agricultural land, 32.4% is used for growing crops and 10.6% is pastures, while 4.3% is used for orchards or vine crops. Of the water in the municipality, 3.9% is in lakes and 2.3% is in rivers and streams.

== Coat of arms ==
The blazon of the municipal coat of arms is Gules a Maltese Cross throughout Argent over an Annulet of the same. The community uses the badge of the Knights Hospitaller in a red field as its arms, in memory of the commandery which is mentioned in records from 1236. The officiating pastor of Leuggern is, by virtue of his office, a chaplain of magistral grace of the Order of Malta.

== Demographics ==
Leuggern has a population (as of December 2020) of 2,180. As of 2008, 44.2% of the population are foreign nationals. Over the last 10 years (1997–2007) the population has changed at a rate of −4.6%. Most of the population (as of 2000) speaks German (93.6%), with Italian being second most common (1.8%) and Serbo-Croatian being third (1.6%).

As of 2008, the gender distribution of the population was 49.6% male and 50.4% female. The population was made up of 874 Swiss men (42.7% of the population), and 141 (6.9%) non-Swiss men. There were 922 Swiss women (45.1%), and 108 (5.3%) non-Swiss women. In 2008 there were 6 live births to Swiss citizens and 4 births to non-Swiss citizens, and in same time span there were 18 deaths of Swiss citizens and 1 non-Swiss citizen deaths. Ignoring immigration and emigration, the population of Swiss citizens decreased by 12 while the foreign population increased by 3. There were 2 Swiss men who immigrated from another country back to Switzerland, 2 Swiss women who immigrated from another country back to Switzerland, 14 non-Swiss men who emigrated from Switzerland to another country and 6 non-Swiss women who emigrated from Switzerland to another country. The total Swiss population change in 2008 was a decrease of 27 and the non-Swiss population change was an increase of 16 people. This represents a population growth rate of −0.5%.

The age distribution, as of 2008, in Leuggern is; 172 children or 8.3% of the population are between 0 and 9 years old and 286 teenagers or 13.8% are between 10 and 19. Of the adult population, 221 people or 10.7% of the population are between 20 and 29 years old. 239 people or 11.6% are between 30 and 39, 364 people or 17.6% are between 40 and 49, and 348 people or 16.9% are between 50 and 59. The senior population distribution is 248 people or 12.0% of the population are between 60 and 69 years old, 119 people or 5.8% are between 70 and 79, there are 58 people or 2.8% who are between 80 and 89, and there are 10 people or 0.5% who are 90 and older.

As of 2000 the average number of residents per living room was 0.59 which is about equal to the cantonal average of 0.57 per room. In this case, a room is defined as space of a housing unit of at least 4 m^{2} (43 sq ft) as normal bedrooms, dining rooms, living rooms, kitchens and habitable cellars and attics. About 68.3% of the total households were owner occupied, or in other words did not pay rent (though they may have a mortgage or a rent-to-own agreement).

As of 2000, there were 43 homes with 1 or 2 persons in the household, 321 homes with 3 or 4 persons in the household, and 392 homes with 5 or more persons in the household. As of 2000, there were 775 private households (homes and apartments) in the municipality, and an average of 2.7 persons per household. In 2008 there were 415 single family homes (or 47.8% of the total) out of a total of 869 homes and apartments. There were a total of 23 empty apartments for a 2.6% vacancy rate. As of 2007, the construction rate of new housing units was 0.5 new units per 1000 residents.

In the 2007 federal election the most popular party was the SVP which received 52.59% of the vote. The next three most popular parties were the CVP (22.45%), the SP (8.78%) and the FDP (8.18%). In the federal election, a total of 756 votes were cast, and the voter turnout was 51.5%.

The historical population is given in the following table:

Historical population
Year	Pop.	±%
1850	1,193	—
1900	1,013	−15.1%
1950	1,374	+35.6%
1980	1,672	+21.7%
1990	1,981	+18.5%
2000	2,192	+10.7%

== Heritage sites of national significance ==
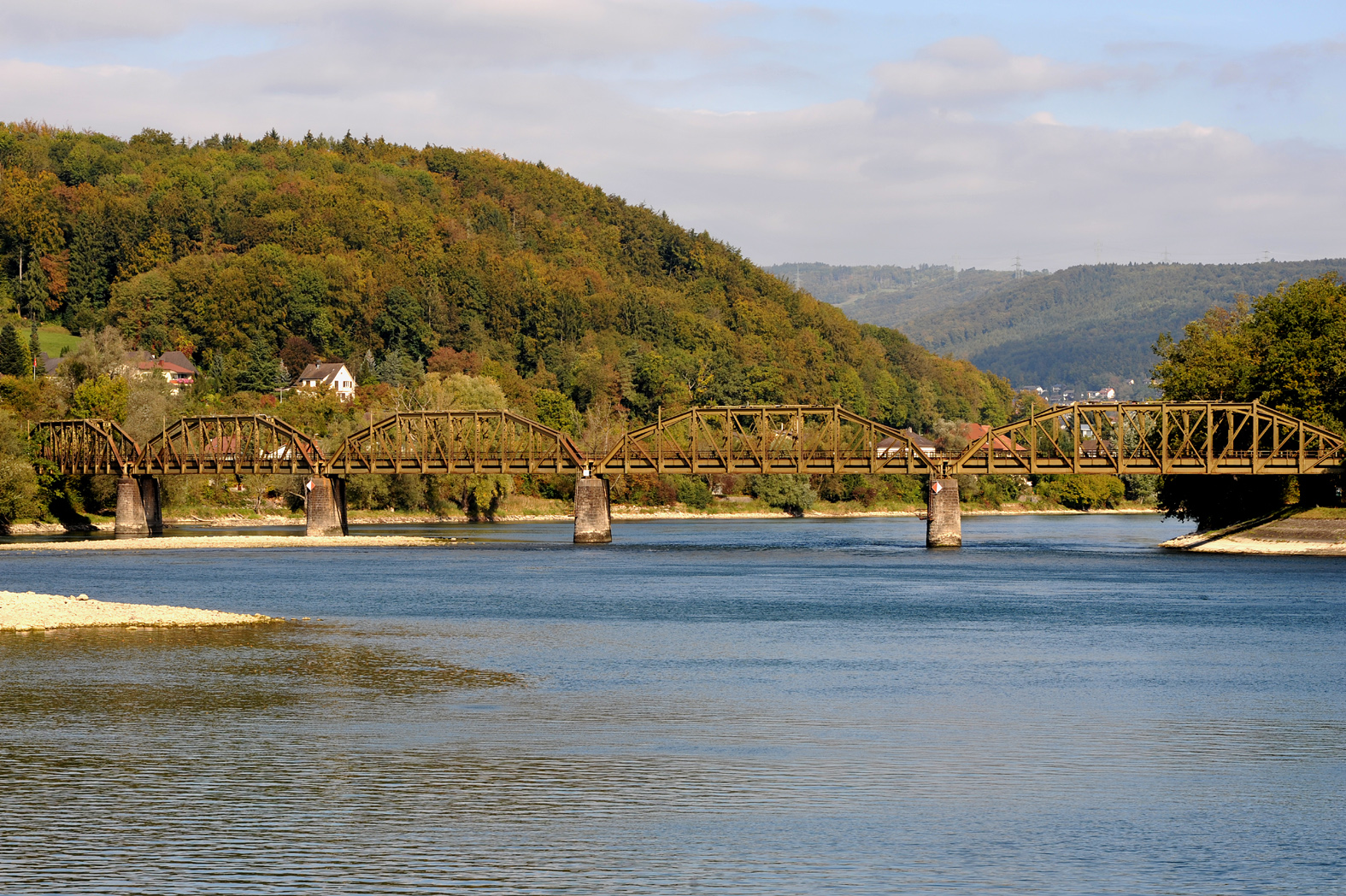
Railroad bridge Koblenz-Felsenau

The Koblenz Aar railway bridge (which is shared with Koblenz) and the ruined Roman watchtower over the Rhine at Im Sand-Felsenau are listed as Swiss heritage sites of national significance. The hamlet of Hettenschwil is designated as part of the Inventory of Swiss Heritage Sites.

== Economy ==
As of 2007, Leuggern had an unemployment rate of 1.61%. As of 2005, there were 164 people employed in the primary economic sector and about 54 businesses involved in this sector. 253 people are employed in the secondary sector and there are 32 businesses in this sector. 489 people are employed in the tertiary sector, with 70 businesses in this sector.

In 2000 there were 1,186 workers who lived in the municipality. Of these, 859 or about 72.4% of the residents worked outside Leuggern while 397 people commuted into the municipality for work. There were a total of 724 jobs (of at least 6 hours per week) in the municipality. Of the working population, 9.9% used public transportation to get to work, and 56.4% used a private car.

== Religion ==
From the 2000 census, 1,439 or 65.6% were Roman Catholic, while 471 or 21.5% belonged to the Swiss Reformed Church. Of the rest of the population, there were 4 individuals (or about 0.18% of the population) who belonged to the Christian Catholic faith.

== Education ==
The entire Swiss population is generally well educated. In Leuggern about 74.8% of the population (between age 25 and 64) have completed either non-mandatory upper secondary education or additional higher education (either university or a Fachhochschule). Of the school age population (in the 2008/2009 school year), there are 144 students attending primary school, there are 140 students attending tertiary or university level schooling in the municipality.
