= Mandach =

- Municipality
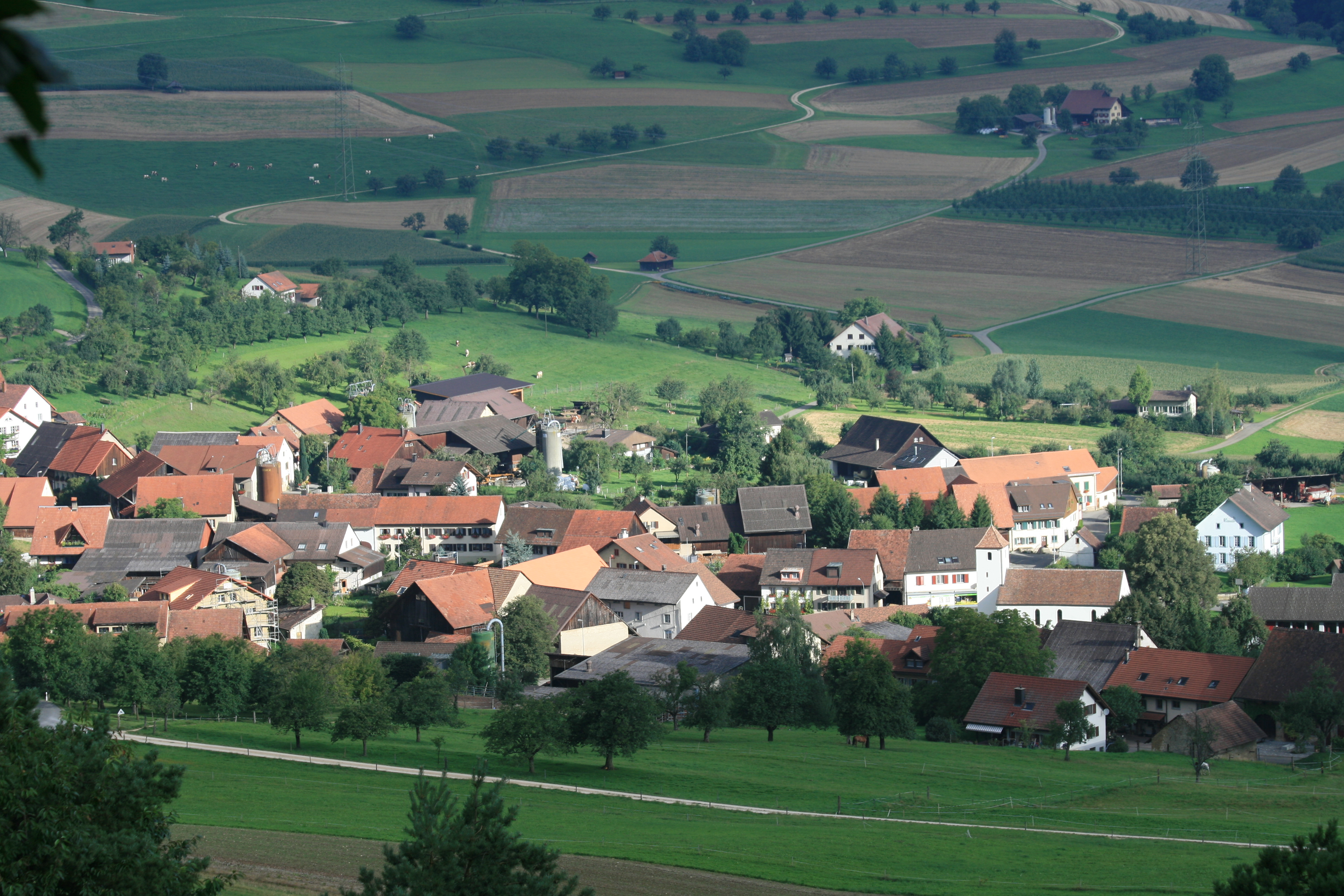

- Flag Coat of arms
- Location of Mandach
- Location within Switzerland Location within Canton of Aargau
- Coordinates: 47°33′N 8°11′E
- Country: Switzerland
- Canton: Aargau
- District: Brugg

Area
  - Total: 5.55 km^{2} (2.14 sq mi)
- Elevation: 489 m (1,604 ft)

Population (December 2020)
  - Total: 325
  - Density: 58.6/km^{2} (152/sq mi)
- Time zone: UTC+01:00 (CET)
  - Summer (DST): UTC+02:00 (CEST)
- Postal code: 5318
- SFOS number: 4105
- ISO 3166 code: CH-AG
- Surrounded by: Böttstein, Hottwil, Leuggern, Villigen, Wil
- Website: mandach.ch

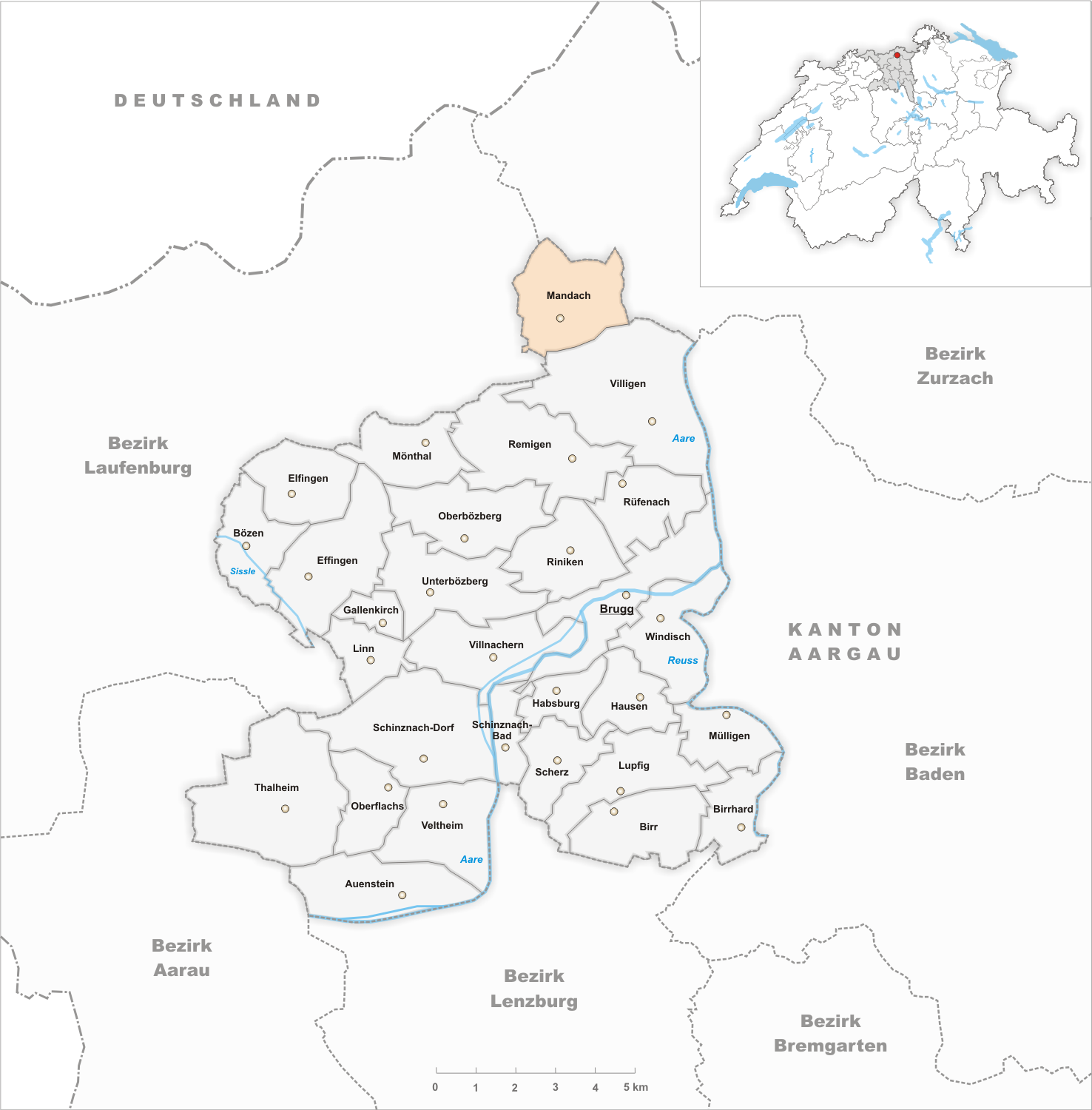
Mandach

Mandach is a municipality in the district of Brugg in canton of Aargau in Switzerland.

== History ==
Aerial view (1958)

The name is evidently of Roman origin (cf. Rüfenach and Zurzach), being from Late Latin (praedium) Manduccacum, "estate (belonging to) Manduccus". In 1072 the Lords of Wessenberg donated a chapel in near the modern village. However, Mandach is first mentioned in 1218 as Mandacho. The major landowners were Säckingen Abbey which possessed considerable property in Mandach and two Habsburg vassals who owned castles in the village. After the Lords of Wessenberg, the village passed into the hands of the lords of Büttikon and Heudorf. In 1468, after the siege of Waldshut, the Confederates took Mandach and added it to the Schenkenberg district. In 1518 a fire destroyed the village and in 1593 and 1668 it was ravaged by the plague. During the Protestant Reformation the village converted to the new doctrine.

Throughout the Middle Ages the major economic activity in the village was agriculture and viticulture. In 1740 cotton weaving entered the village through the Hediger family. Due to its location and lack of transportation infrastructure, the village remained untouched by industrialization in the 19th century, which led to a strong population decline. In 2000, the agricultural section still provides three-fifths of the jobs in the village.

== Geography ==
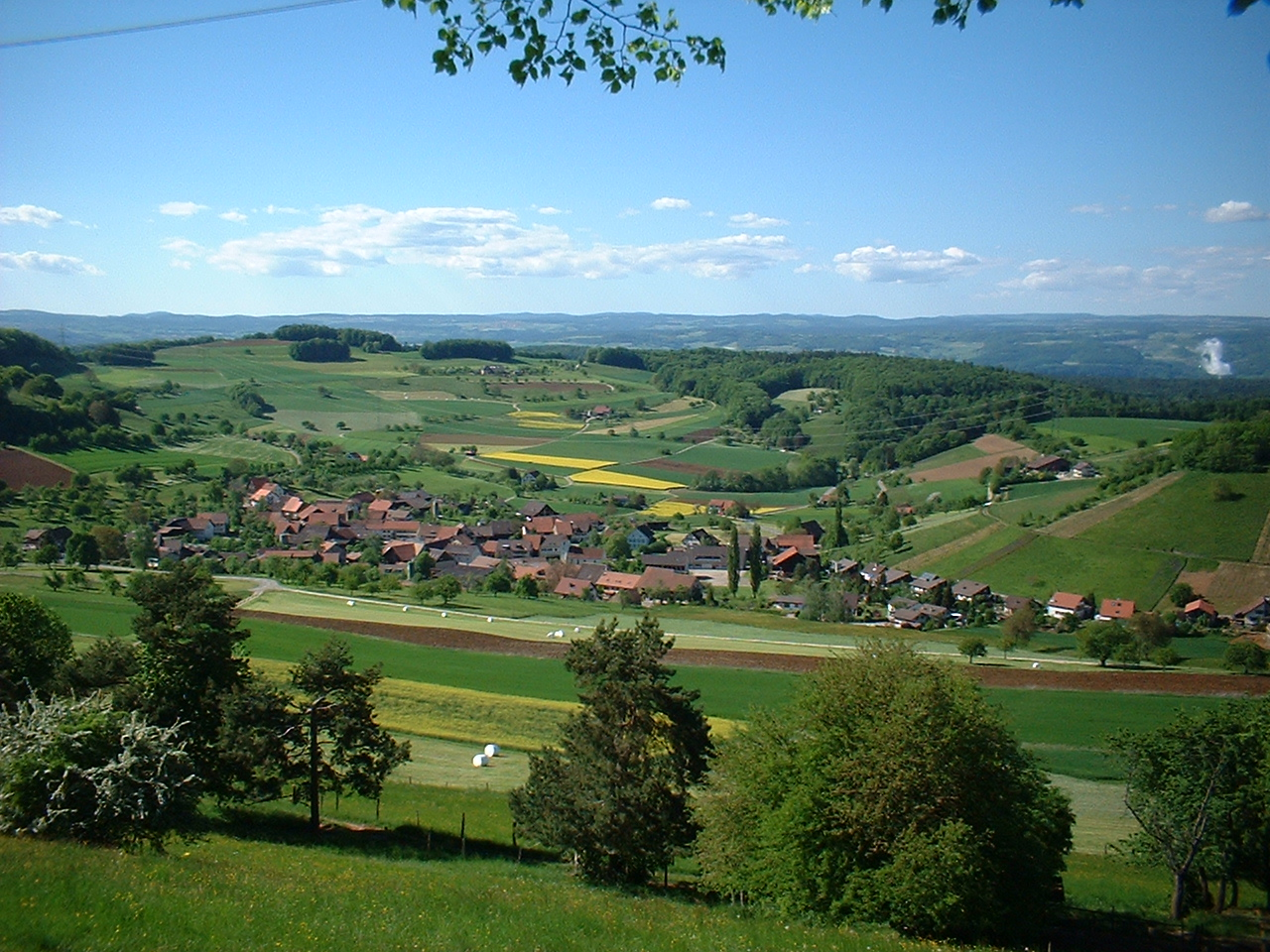
View to the north on Mandach, far in the background the Black Forest.

Mandach has an area, as of 2009, of 5.55 square kilometers (2.14 sq mi). Of this area, 3.75 square kilometers (1.45 sq mi) or 67.6% is used for agricultural purposes, while 1.47 square kilometers (0.57 sq mi) or 26.5% is forested. Of the rest of the land, 0.35 square kilometers (0.14 sq mi) or 6.3% is settled (buildings or roads).

Of the built up area, housing and buildings made up 2.9% and transportation infrastructure made up 3.1%. 25.4% of the total land area is heavily forested and 1.1% is covered with orchards or small clusters of trees. Of the agricultural land, 32.3% is used for growing crops and 29.9% is pastures, while 5.4% is used for orchards or vine crops.

The municipality is located in the Brugg district between Rotberg and Besseberg. It consists of the haufendorf village (an irregular, unplanned and quite closely packed village, built around a central square) of Mandach.

== Coat of arms ==
The blazon of the municipal coat of arms is Per fess Argent a Semi Negro beaded of the first and Gules.

== Demographics ==
Mandach has a population (as of December 2020) of 325 As of June 2009, 3.2% of the population are foreign nationals. Over the last 10 years (1997–2007) the population has changed at a rate of -1.9%. Most of the population (as of 2000) speaks German (98.4%), with Serbo-Croatian being second most common ( 0.6%) and Italian being third ( 0.3%).

The age distribution, as of 2008, in Mandach is; 38 children or 12.3% of the population are between 0 and 9 years old and 48 teenagers or 15.5% are between 10 and 19. Of the adult population, 34 people or 11.0% of the population are between 20 and 29 years old. 41 people or 13.2% are between 30 and 39, 42 people or 13.5% are between 40 and 49, and 48 people or 15.5% are between 50 and 59. The senior population distribution is 34 people or 11.0% of the population are between 60 and 69 years old, 13 people or 4.2% are between 70 and 79, there are 11 people or 3.5% who are between 80 and 89, and there is 1 person who is 90 or older.

As of 2000 the average number of residents per living room was 0.62 which is about equal to the cantonal average of 0.57 per room. In this case, a room is defined as space of a housing unit of at least 4 m^{2} (43 sq ft) as normal bedrooms, dining rooms, living rooms, kitchens and habitable cellars and attics.

About 61.5% of the total households were owner occupied, or in other words did not pay rent (though they may have a mortgage or a rent-to-own agreement). As of 2000, there were 11 homes with 1 or 2 persons in the household, 41 homes with 3 or 4 persons in the household, and 57 homes with 5 or more persons in the household. The average number of people per household was 2.80 individuals. In 2008 there were 43 single family homes (or 34.1% of the total) out of a total of 126 homes and apartments. There were a total of 3 empty apartments for a 2.4% vacancy rate. As of 2007, the construction rate of new housing units was 0 new units per 1000 residents.

In the 2007 federal election the most popular party was the SVP which received 61.5% of the vote. The next three most popular parties were the FDP (8.6%), the CVP (8.1%) and the SP (7.1%).

The entire Swiss population is generally well educated. In Mandach about 79.6% of the population (between age 25 and 64) have completed either non-mandatory upper secondary education or additional higher education (either university or a Fachhochschule). Of the school age population (in the 2008/2009 school year), there are 34 students attending primary school in the municipality.

The historical population is given in the following table:

Historical population
Year	Pop.	±%
1850	504	—
1900	361	−28.4%
1950	292	−19.1%
2000	313	+7.2%

== Sights ==
The village of Mandach is designated as part of the Inventory of Swiss Heritage Sites.

== Economy ==
As of 2007, Mandach had an unemployment rate of 0.89%. As of 2005, there were 43 people employed in the primary economic sector and about 21 businesses involved in this sector. 2 people are employed in the secondary sector and there is 1 business in this sector. 34 people are employed in the tertiary sector, with 9 businesses in this sector.

As of 2000 there was a total of 170 workers who lived in the municipality. Of these, 120 or about 70.6% of the residents worked outside Mandach while 15 people commuted into the municipality for work. There were a total of 65 jobs (of at least 6 hours per week) in the municipality. Of the working population, 7.5% used public transportation to get to work, and 48.9% used a private car.

== Religion ==
From the 2000 census, 52 or 16.6% were Roman Catholic, while 245 or 78.3% belonged to the Swiss Reformed Church.
