= Schwaderloch =

- Municipality
- Flag Coat of arms
- Location of Schwaderloch
- Location within Switzerland Location within Canton of Aargau
- Coordinates: 47°35′N 8°9′E
- Country: Switzerland
- Canton: Aargau
- District: Laufenburg

Area
  - Total: 2.78 km^{2} (1.07 sq mi)
- Elevation: 321 m (1,053 ft)

Population (December 2006)
  - Total: 694
  - Density: 250/km^{2} (647/sq mi)
- Time zone: UTC+01:00 (CET)
  - Summer (DST): UTC+02:00 (CEST)
- Postal code: 5326
- SFOS number: 4176
- ISO 3166 code: CH-AG
- Surrounded by: Albbruck (DE-BW), Dogern (DE-BW), Etzgen, Leibstadt, Mettau, Wil
- Website: schwaderloch.ch

Schwaderloch is a municipality in the district of Laufenburg in the canton of Aargau in Switzerland.

== Geography ==
Aerial view (1958)

Schwaderloch has an area, as of 2009, of 2.78 square kilometers (1.07 sq mi). Of this area, 1 km^{2} (0.39 sq mi) or 36.0% is used for agricultural purposes, while 1.17 km^{2} (0.45 sq mi) or 42.1% is forested. Of the rest of the land, 0.32 km^{2} (0.12 sq mi) or 11.5% is settled (buildings or roads), 0.29 km^{2} (0.11 sq mi) or 10.4% is either rivers or lakes and 0.01 km^{2} (2.5 acres) or 0.4% is unproductive land.

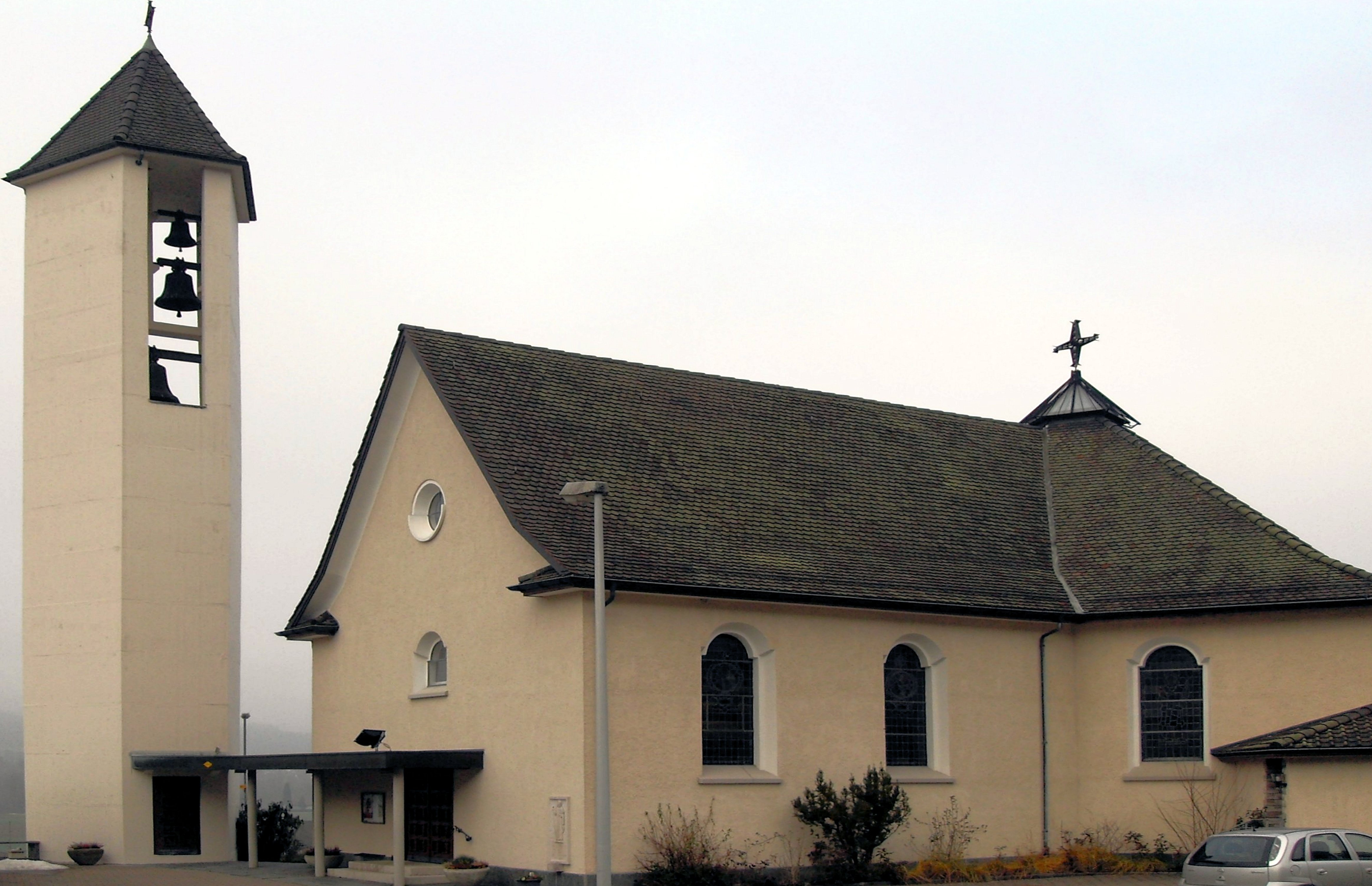
St. Polycarp Church in Schwaderloch

Of the built up area, industrial buildings made up 1.4% of the total area while housing and buildings made up 6.5% and transportation infrastructure made up 2.9%. Out of the forested land, 40.6% of the total land area is heavily forested and 1.4% is covered with orchards or small clusters of trees. Of the agricultural land, 28.8% is used for growing crops and 5.8% is pastures, while 1.4% is used for orchards or vine crops. All the water in the municipality is in rivers and streams.

== Coat of arms ==
The blazon of the municipal coat of arms is Or Flames Gules issuant from Coupeaux Vert.

== Demographics ==
Schwaderloch has a population (as of December 2020) of 689. As of June 2009, 14.5% of the population are foreign nationals. Over the last 10 years (1997–2007) the population has changed at a rate of 3.5%. Most of the population (as of 2000) speaks German (92.7%), with Albanian being second most common ( 2.9%) and Italian being third ( 1.1%).

The age distribution, as of 2008, in Schwaderloch is; 65 children or 9.8% of the population are between 0 and 9 years old and 90 teenagers or 13.5% are between 10 and 19. Of the adult population, 66 people or 9.9% of the population are between 20 and 29 years old. 80 people or 12.0% are between 30 and 39, 133 people or 20.0% are between 40 and 49, and 98 people or 14.7% are between 50 and 59. The senior population distribution is 67 people or 10.1% of the population are between 60 and 69 years old, 37 people or 5.6% are between 70 and 79, there are 24 people or 3.6% who are between 80 and 89, and there are 6 people or 0.9% who are 90 and older.

As of 2000, there were 15 homes with 1 or 2 persons in the household, 105 homes with 3 or 4 persons in the household, and 125 homes with 5 or more persons in the household. As of 2000, there were 254 private households (homes and apartments) in the municipality, and an average of 2.6 persons per household. In 2008 there were 162 single family homes (or 55.9% of the total) out of a total of 290 homes and apartments. There were a total of 9 empty apartments for a 3.1% vacancy rate. As of 2007, the construction rate of new housing units was 1.5 new units per 1000 residents.

In the 2007 federal election the most popular party was the SVP which received 57% of the vote. The next three most popular parties were the CVP (14.2%), the SP (11.3%) and the FDP (7.9%).

In Schwaderloch about 68.9% of the population (between age 25–64) have completed either non-mandatory upper secondary education or additional higher education (either university or a Fachhochschule). Of the school age population (in the 2008/2009 school year), there are 56 students attending primary school in the municipality.

The historical population is given in the following table:

Historical population
Year	Pop.	±%
1975	489	—
1980	464	−5.1%
1990	522	+12.5%
2000	670	+28.4%

== Heritage sites of national significance ==
The Oberes Bürgli and Unteres Bürgli, two late-Roman era Rhine river watchtowers are listed as Swiss heritage sites of national significance.

== Economy ==
As of 2007, Schwaderloch had an unemployment rate of 1.3%. As of 2005, there were 15 people employed in the primary economic sector and about 7 businesses involved in this sector. 96 people are employed in the secondary sector and there are 7 businesses in this sector. 56 people are employed in the tertiary sector, with 14 businesses in this sector.

In 2000 there were 326 workers who lived in the municipality. Of these, 247 or about 75.8% of the residents worked outside Schwaderloch while 65 people commuted into the municipality for work. There were a total of 144 jobs (of at least 6 hours per week) in the municipality. Of the working population, 9.6% used public transportation to get to work, and 57.8% used a private car.

== Religion ==
From the 2000 census, 407 or 62.1% were Roman Catholic, while 136 or 20.8% belonged to the Swiss Reformed Church. Of the rest of the population, there was 1 individual who belonged to the Christian Catholic faith.
