= Dogern =

- Municipality
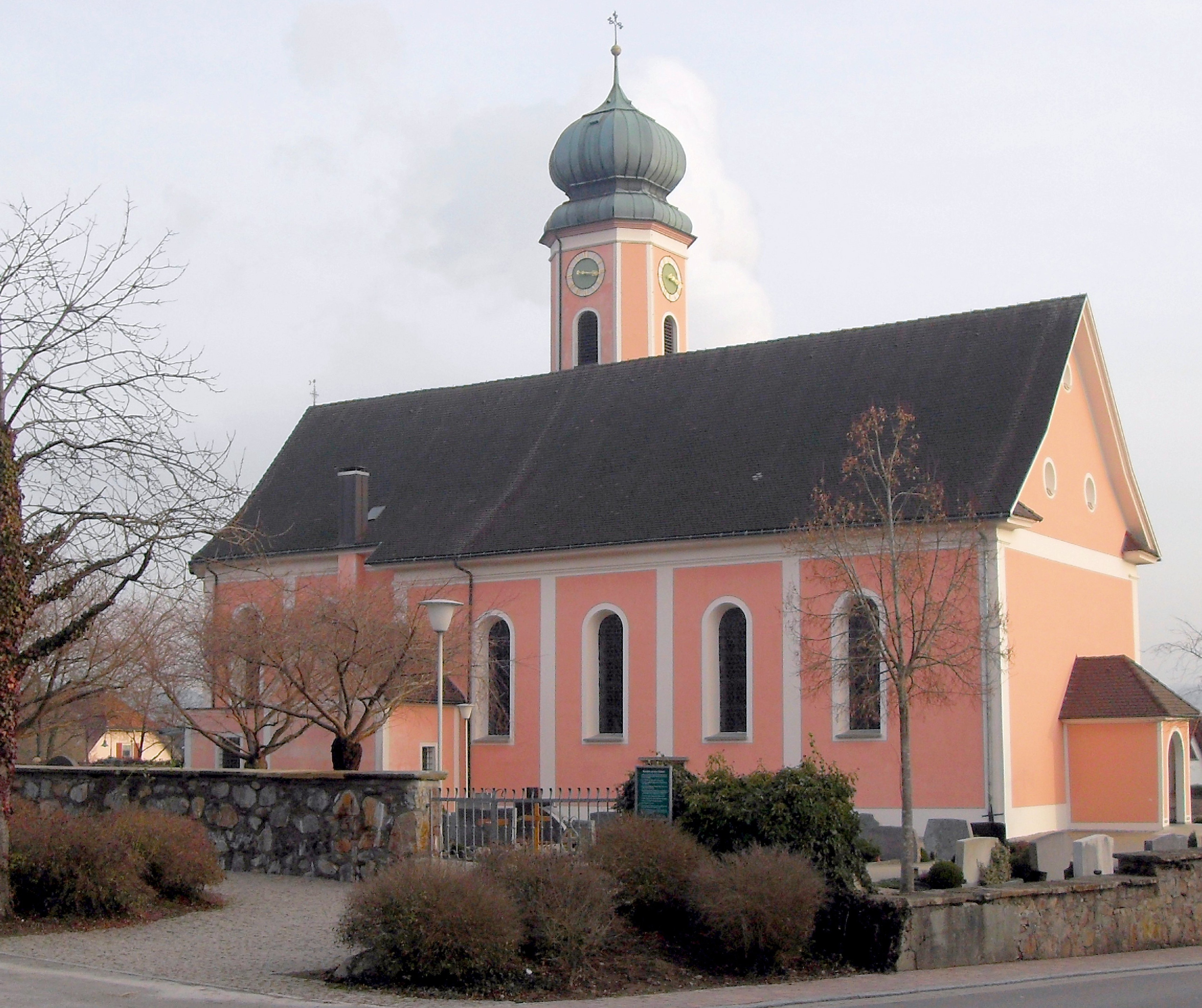

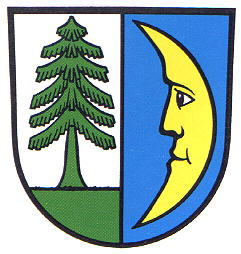
- Coat of arms

- Location of Dogern within Waldshut district
- Interactive map of Dogern
- Location within Germany Location within Baden-Württemberg
- Coordinates: 47°36′31″N 08°10′03″E
- Country: Germany
- State: Baden-Württemberg
- Admin. region: Freiburg
- District: Waldshut

Government
  - Mayor (2017–25): Fabian Prause

Area
  - Total: 7.45 km^{2} (2.88 sq mi)
- Elevation: 315 m (1,033 ft)

Population (2025-12-31)
  - Total: 2,236
  - Density: 300/km^{2} (777/sq mi)
- Time zone: UTC+01:00 (CET)
  - Summer (DST): UTC+02:00 (CEST)
- Postal codes: 79804
- Dialling codes: 07751
- Vehicle registration: WT
- Website: www.dogern.de

Dogern (German pronunciation: [ˈdoːɡɐn]) is a municipality in the district of Waldshut in Baden-Württemberg, Germany.

== Twin towns ==
Dogern has been twinned with Le Grand-Lemps, France since 1988.

== Geography ==
Dogern is located in Waldshut in the state of Baden-Württemberg. Dogern is one of the few settlements of Hochrhein that is not located on the border to Switzerland.

== History ==
The name Dogern appeared 1128 with a Kreuzritter Henricus a Dogern and not as a community.

In 1284 the village belonged to Johaniterkommende in Klingnau/Swiss.

The Johanniter sold the village rights in 1335 to Kloster Königsfelden/Swiss.

When the Reformation time was abolished, Kanton Bern took over the property for around 150 years.

After that it was sold in 1684 through a contract to Kloster St. Blasien.

In 1806 after the abolition Dogern came to Baden.

Dogern was a main town in the district.

== Governance ==
Fabian Prause became mayor in December 2017. He was the leader of the Department of Streets from March 2013 until December 2017. He is Chairman of DRK Ortsverbands Dogern, second chairman of supporter club SV Dogern and deputy chairman of Wastewater association Vorderes Albtal.

He is married to Stephanie Prause.

== Partnership ==
In 1988 Dogern made a partnership with the French community of Le Grand-Lemps. They support all activities that develop the partnership including group trips, student exchanges and hosts.

== Demographics ==
According to the 2024 census, Dogern has a population of 2,254.

== Amenities ==
Notable landmarks include church St. Clemens, Partnership fountain in Rosengarten and suitability Master monument.

Tourist destinations include the viewpoint of Rüttibuck and Bürgelrain.

== Coat of arms ==
The coat is in a shield in the front in silver (white) on a green background a fir tree at the back on blue a golden ( yellow) moon with face.

== See also ==
- List of cities and towns in Germany
