= Mettau, Switzerland =

Mettau
- Former municipality
- Flag Coat of arms
- Location of Mettau
- Location within Switzerland Location within Canton of Aargau
- Coordinates: 47°34′N 8°8′E
- Country: Switzerland
- Canton: Aargau
- District: Laufenburg

Area
  - Total: 3.29 km^{2} (1.27 sq mi)
- Elevation: 347 m (1,138 ft)

Population (December 2006)
  - Total: 317
  - Density: 96.4/km^{2} (250/sq mi)
- Time zone: UTC+01:00 (CET)
  - Summer (DST): UTC+02:00 (CEST)
- Postal code: 5274
- SFOS number: 4171
- ISO 3166 code: CH-AG
- Surrounded by: Etzgen, Oberhofen, Schwaderloch, Wil
- Website: www.mettau.ch

Mettau was a municipality in the district of Laufenburg in the canton of Aargau in Switzerland. On 1 January 2010 the municipalities of Hottwil, Etzgen, Mettau, Oberhofen and Wil merged into the municipality of Mettauertal.

Aerial view (1958)
