= Gansingen =

- Municipality
- Flag Coat of arms
- Location of Gansingen
- Location within Switzerland Location within Canton of Aargau
- Coordinates: 47°32′N 8°8′E
- Country: Switzerland
- Canton: Aargau
- District: Laufenburg

Area
  - Total: 8.77 km^{2} (3.39 sq mi)
- Elevation: 382 m (1,253 ft)

Population (December 2006)
  - Total: 934
  - Density: 106/km^{2} (276/sq mi)
- Time zone: UTC+01:00 (CET)
  - Summer (DST): UTC+02:00 (CEST)
- Postal code: 5272
- SFOS number: 4164
- ISO 3166 code: CH-AG
- Surrounded by: Hottwil, Mönthal, Oberhofen, Remigen, Sulz, Wil
- Twin towns: Gansheim (Germany)
- Website: gansingen.ch

Gansingen is a municipality in the district of Laufenburg in the canton of Aargau in Switzerland.

== History ==
While some Roman era artifacts have been discovered, the village of Gansingen is first mentioned in 1240 as Gansungen. Gansingen is located on the old road between the Rhine valley and the Aare valley over the Bürersteig. Between 1700 and 1723 a number of Savoyards emigrated to Gansingen. Until the creation of the Helvetic Republic in 1797 it belonged to the court of Bernau in the Austrian herrschaft of Laufenburg. Then, with the Act of Mediation and the creation of the Canton of Aargau in 1803, it became part of the new Canton. In 1805, the pastor Johann Nepomuk Brentano built a girls' school in the village. In 1814, a fire raged through the village, and in 1829 the hamlet of Galten was destroyed by fire.

The parish church of St. George was first mentioned in 1240 and was replaced with a new building in the 19th century. Until 1802, the rights to appoint the parish priest and property rights to the land were held 1802 were in possession of the Collegiate church of Säckingen.

Because of crop failures in the mid-19th Century, the village population decreased after a wave of emigration. Until the 20th Century, the major economic sources in Gansingen were agriculture and light manufacturing. Today, many residents commute into the region of Baden-Brugg and the Rhine valley.

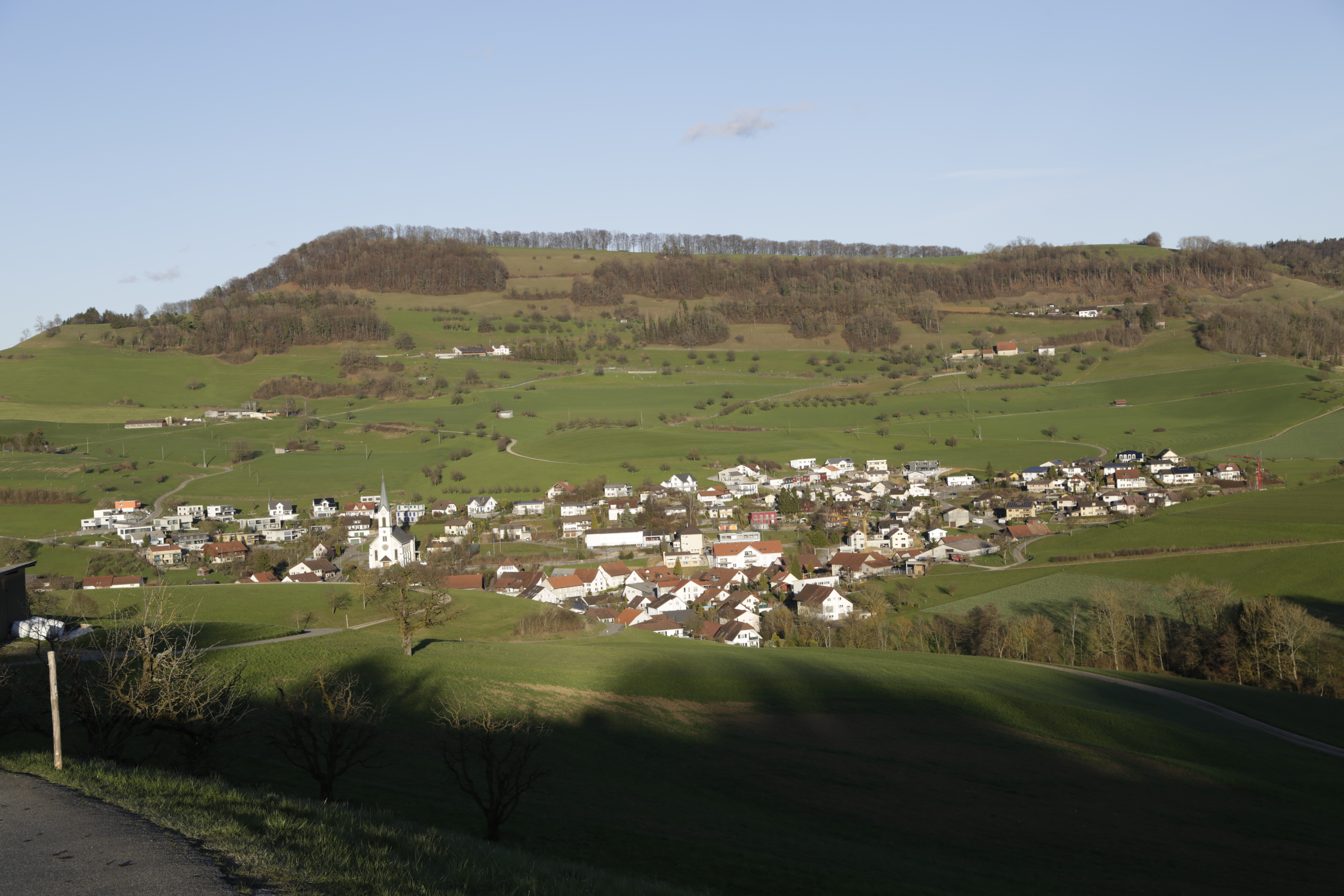
Gansingen

== Geography ==
Gansingen has an area, as of 2009, of 8.77 square kilometers (3.39 sq mi). Of this area, 4.74 square kilometers (1.83 sq mi) or 54.0% is used for agricultural purposes, while 3.32 square kilometers (1.28 sq mi) or 37.9% is forested. Of the rest of the land, 0.68 square kilometers (0.26 sq mi) or 7.8% is settled (buildings or roads), 0.02 km^{2} (4.9 acres) or 0.2% is either rivers or lakes.

Of the built up area, housing and buildings made up 4.1% and transportation infrastructure made up 2.7%. 35.5% of the total land area is heavily forested and 2.4% is covered with orchards or small clusters of trees. Of the agricultural land, 23.3% is used for growing crops and 26.5% is pastures, while 4.3% is used for orchards or vine crops. All the water in the municipality is in rivers and streams.

The municipality is located in the Laufenburg district, in the upper Fricktal. It consists of the haufendorf village (an irregular, unplanned and quite closely packed village, built around a central square) of Gansingen and the hamlets of Büren and Galten.

== Coat of arms ==
The blazon of the municipal coat of arms is Azure a Goose Argent rising beaked and membered Or on Coupeaux Vert. This is an example of canting where the goose (German: Gans) represents part of the municipal name.

== Demographics ==
Gansingen has a population (as of December 2020) of 1,066. As of June 2009, 3.9% of the population are foreign nationals. Over the last 10 years (1997–2007) the population has changed at a rate of -0.1%. Most of the population (as of 2000) speaks German (96.7%), with English being second most common ( 0.6%) and French being third ( 0.5%).

The age distribution, as of 2008, in Gansingen is; 86 children or 9.0% of the population are between 0 and 9 years old and 123 teenagers or 12.9% are between 10 and 19. Of the adult population, 114 people or 11.9% of the population are between 20 and 29 years old. 107 people or 11.2% are between 30 and 39, 152 people or 15.9% are between 40 and 49, and 151 people or 15.8% are between 50 and 59. The senior population distribution is 114 people or 11.9% of the population are between 60 and 69 years old, 71 people or 7.4% are between 70 and 79, there are 30 people or 3.1% who are between 80 and 89, and there are 6 people or 0.6% who are 90 and older.

As of 2000 the average number of residents per living room was 0.57 which is about equal to the cantonal average of 0.57 per room. In this case, a room is defined as space of a housing unit of at least 4 m^{2} (43 sq ft) as normal bedrooms, dining rooms, living rooms, kitchens and habitable cellars and attics. About 74.8% of the total households were owner occupied, or in other words did not pay rent (though they may have a mortgage or a rent-to-own agreement).

As of 2000, there were 19 homes with 1 or 2 persons in the household, 93 homes with 3 or 4 persons in the household, and 205 homes with 5 or more persons in the household. As of 2000, there were 326 private households (homes and apartments) in the municipality, and an average of 2.8 persons per household. In 2008 there were 204 single family homes (or 54.0% of the total) out of a total of 378 homes and apartments. There were a total of 7 empty apartments for a 1.9% vacancy rate. As of 2007, the construction rate of new housing units was 1.1 new units per 1000 residents.

In the 2007 federal election the most popular party was the SVP which received 36.4% of the vote. The next three most popular parties were the CVP (31.2%), the SP (11.8%) and the FDP (8.2%).

The entire Swiss population is generally well educated. In Gansingen about 73.8% of the population (between age 25–64) have completed either non-mandatory upper secondary education or additional higher education (either university or a Fachhochschule). Of the school age population (in the 2008/2009 school year), there are 72 students attending primary school, there are 55 students attending secondary school in the municipality.

The historical population is given in the following table:

Historical population
Year	Pop.	±%
1803	765	—
1850	1,053	+37.6%
1900	723	−31.3%
1950	790	+9.3%
2000	927	+17.3%

== Economy ==
As of 2007, Gansingen had an unemployment rate of 1.72%. As of 2005, there were 92 people employed in the primary economic sector and about 29 businesses involved in this sector. 14 people are employed in the secondary sector and there are 7 businesses in this sector. 83 people are employed in the tertiary sector, with 23 businesses in this sector.

In 2000 there were 470 workers who lived in the municipality. Of these, 348 or about 74.0% of the residents worked outside Gansingen while 46 people commuted into the municipality for work. There were a total of 168 jobs (of at least 6 hours per week) in the municipality. Of the working population, 12.1% used public transportation to get to work, and 57.2% used a private car.

== Religion ==
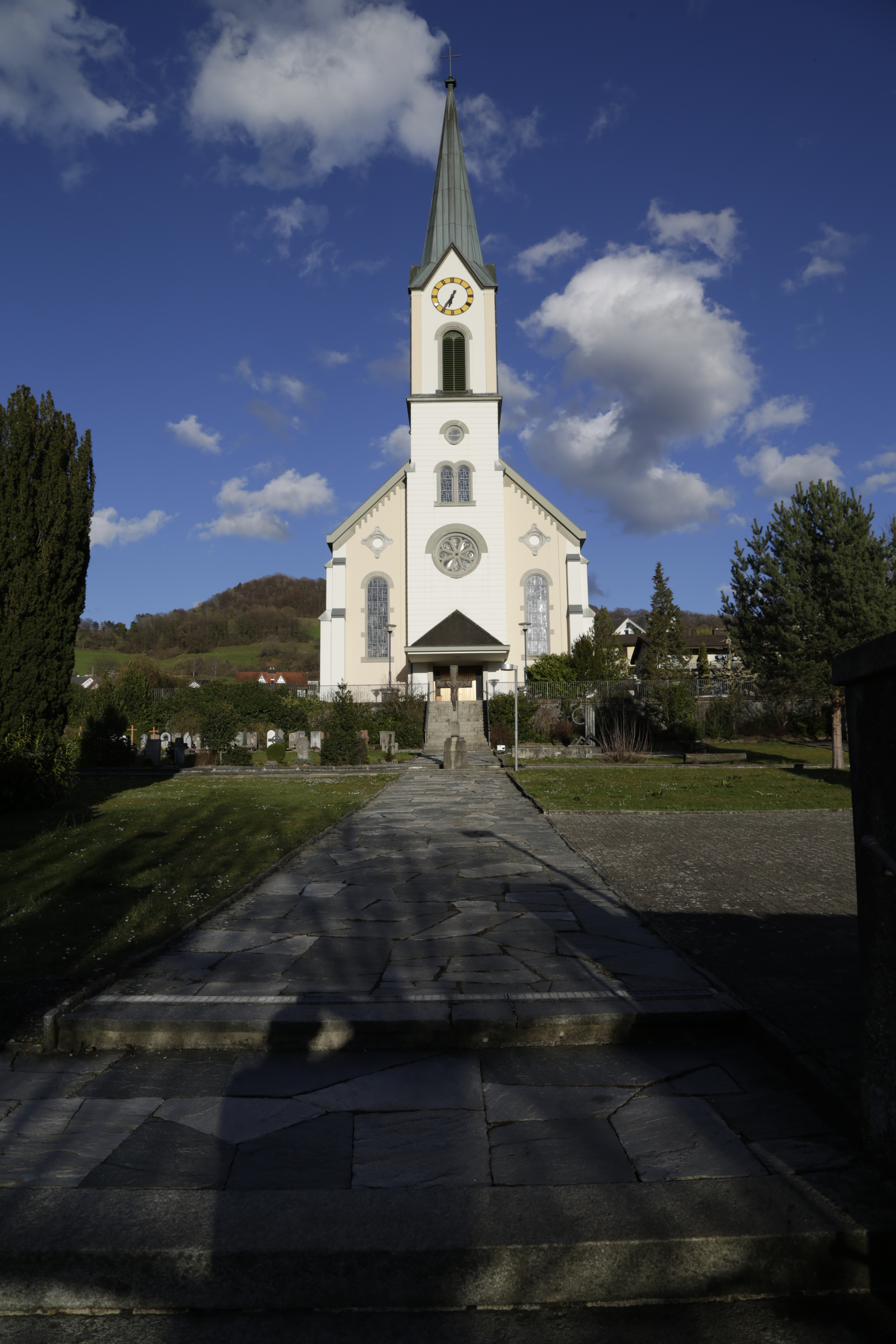
Catholic Church in Gansingen

From the 2000 census, 703 or 75.8% were Roman Catholic, while 145 or 15.6% belonged to the Swiss Reformed Church.
