= Herznach-Ueken =

- Municipality
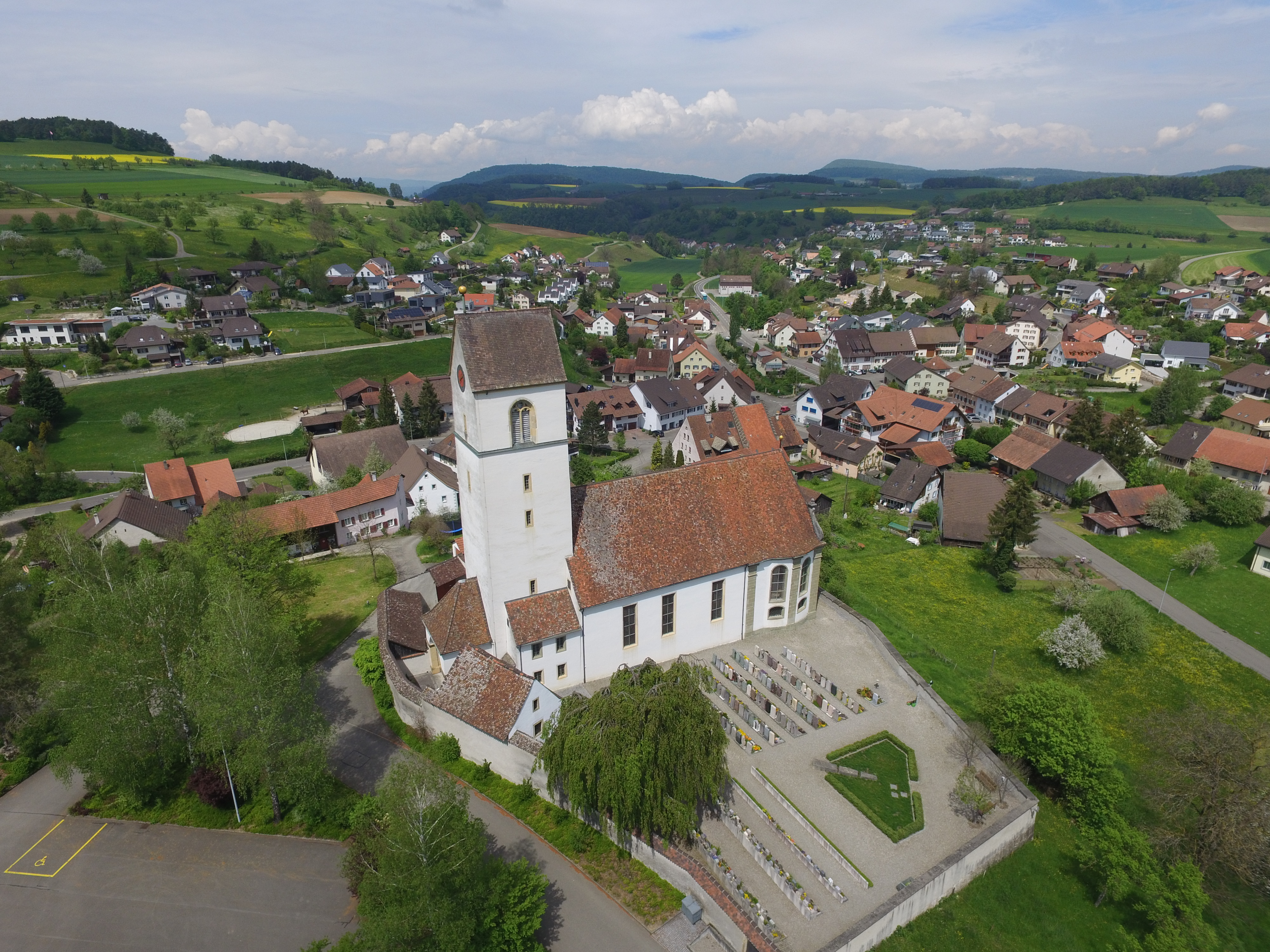
- Herznach village with the St. Nikolaus Church in foreground

- Flag Coat of arms
- Location of Herznach-Ueken
- Location within Switzerland Location within Canton of Aargau
- Coordinates: 47°28′23″N 8°3′6″E
- Country: Switzerland
- Canton: Aargau
- District: Laufenburg

Area
  - Total: 11.37 km^{2} (4.39 sq mi)
- Elevation: 417 m (1,368 ft)

Population (31 December 2020)
  - Total: 2,477
  - Density: 217.9/km^{2} (564.2/sq mi)
- Time zone: UTC+01:00 (CET)
  - Summer (DST): UTC+02:00 (CEST)
- Postal codes: 5027; 5028
- SFOS number: 4186
- ISO 3166 code: CH-AG
- Surrounded by: Densbüren, Frick, Gipf-Oberfrick, Hornussen, Wölflinswil, Zeihen
- Website: https://herznach-ueken.ch/

Herznach-Ueken is a municipality in the district of Laufenburg in the canton of Aargau in Switzerland. It was established on 1 January 2023 with the merger of the municipalities of Herznach and Ueken.

== History ==
On 1 January 2023, the two municipalities of Herznach and Ueken merged to form the new municipality of Herznach-Ueken.

== Coat of arms ==
The first blazon of the municipal coat of arms is Gules a Pitcher Vert lip dexter and handled Or. The pitcher on the coat of arms is an attribute of Saint Verena to whom the chapel of Herznach is devoted. The second blazon is Or a St.Catherine's Wheel Sable.
