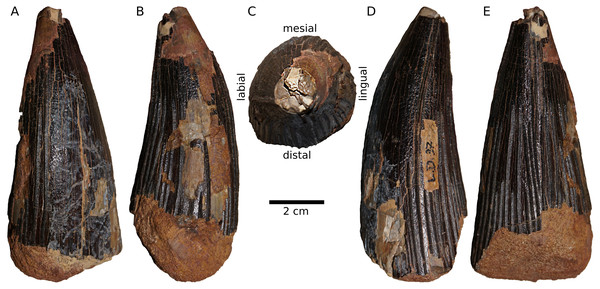
- The holotype tooth crown (NMB L.D.37); in mesial (A), lingual (B), apical (C), labial (D), and distal view (E)

Scientific classification
- Kingdom: Animalia
- Phylum: Chordata
- Class: Reptilia
- Superorder: †Sauropterygia
- Order: †Plesiosauria
- Suborder: †Pliosauroidea
- Family: †Pliosauridae
- Clade: †Thalassophonea
- Genus: †Ischyrodon von Meyer, 1838

Type species
- †Ischyrodon meriani von Meyer, 1838

= Ischyrodon =

Ischyrodon Temporal range: Middle Jurassic, Callovian

Extinct Pliosaurid marine reptile

Ischyrodon (meaning 'strong tooth') is a dubious genus of large pliosaurid plesiosaurs from the Middle Jurassic of Switzerland. The only known species is I. meriani, originally mentioned in 1838 by Hermann von Meyer from a large tooth discovered in Wölflinswil, before being first described in detail by the same author in 1856. The taxon remained valid until 1889, when Richard Lydekker synonymized it with a large species of Pliosaurus. However, in 1960, Lambert Beverly Tarlo noted that the tooth shares more similarities with those of Liopleurodon, instead considering it as a synonym of this latter, a view that was later largely followed in scientific literature. However, a 2022 revision found few differences that would allow it to be distinguished from Liopleurodon and other thalassophonean pliosaurids, then considering it as a nomen dubium.

== Research history ==
Aerial photo from 1950 of Wölflinswil, Switzerland, where the holotype of Ischyrodon was discovered

The only known specimen of Ischyrodon is a large tooth that was discovered in Wölflinswil, in the Canton of Aargau, Switzerland. More precisely, the tooth was probably discovered in an iron mine containing rocks dating from the Middle Jurassic, exploited from the 1200s until 1967. The fossil, consisting precisely of a tooth crown measuring almost 11 cm (4.3 in) high, has since been preserved at the Natural History Museum of Basel, from where it is numbered as NMB L.D.37. This tooth is directly recognized by the Swiss naturalist Peter Merian as coming from a new taxon of a large marine reptile, from which he named it Ischyrodon, although he never published a paper officially naming it. The genus name comes from the Ancient Greek ἰσχυρός (ischyros, "strong") and ὀδόν (odṓn, "tooth"), all meaning "strong tooth", because of its large size. In scientific literature, this name is first mentioned by the German paleontologist Christian Erich Hermann von Meyer in 1838, in a conversation informing the editors of the existence of fossil specimens that had been recently discovered at that time, but without any descriptions or figures. Still in the same conversation, the author named it Ischyrodon meriani, in honor of Merian. Although mentioned in several articles and manuals over the following years, this tooth crown was not first formally described and illustrated until 1856, still by von Meyer, 18 years after the publication of its scientific name.

In 1841, von Meyer named the species Thaumatosaurus oolithicus based on a fragmentary specimen consisting of partial teeth, skull elements, vertebrae, and ribs from deposits in Württemberg, Germany, possibly dating to the Oxfordian. In his description, he notes that the teeth of this specimen are similar to that of Ischyrodon, but finally considered the two taxa as distinct in 1856. In 1883, Russian paleontologist Walerian Kiprijanoff suggested that Ischyrodon was closely related to Pliosaurus, and consequently classified the latter two, along with Polyptychodon and Thaumatosaurus, within a new group of sauropterygians that he named Thaumatosauria. Two years later, Friedrich August von Quenstedt classified Ischyrodon among the Plesiosauria and highlighted its dental similarities with those of Pliosaurus and Polyptychodon. While Karl Alfred von Zittel considers Ischyrodon to be similar to Pliosaurus, British paleontologist Richard Lydekker considered it a synonym of this latter in 1889. He noted that the tooth had all the features present in teeth from Kimmeridgian-aged England pliosaurs, and because of its large size he provisionally assigned it to the imposing species Pliosaurus macromerus. Lydekker's opinion was thus followed by some studies published during the 20th century. In 1960, Lambert Beverly Tarlo suggested that the tooth of Ischyrodon seemed to have similar traits to that of Liopleurodon and was provisionally considered as a synonym of it. However, the author notes that his affection is not entirely justified based on the figure present in von Meyer's 1856 description. Tarlo's view was followed in many subsequent studies and works, noting that this tooth would be a tangible proof of the presence of Liopleurodon in Switzerland. The rise of studies describing pliosaurid teeth from the thalassophonean subgroup prompted Czech paleontologist Daniel Madzia and colleagues to revise this synonymy in 2022. The authors noted that while the tooth most likely came from a Liopleurodon or a similar animal, they find that there is too little information available to make a confident assignment, leaving then Ischyrodon as a nomen dubium.

== Description ==
Ischyrodon is a plesiosaurian of the "pliosauromorph" morphotype, meaning it had a large head and a short neck, unlike the "plesiosauromorphs", in which these anatomical proportions are reversed. Like all other plesiosaurs, Ischyrodon had a short tail, a barrel-shaped body, and all of its limbs modified into large flippers. The large size of the holotype tooth crown of Ischyrodon suggests that it came from a particularly large pliosaurid, although no size estimate has been given. The morphology of the latter nevertheless suggests that it originates from the anterior half of the right maxilla or from the left side of the dentary bone. The dental crown also has apicobasal ridges, whose function was to improve the gripping and perforation of prey when biting. However, since Ischyrodon is recognized as a nomen dubium, it possesses traits that are indistinguishable from other thalassophonean pliosaurids.

== Paleoecology and dating ==
Although correctly noted as dating from Middle Jurassic since 1838, there was a uncertainty as to which stratigraphic stage the tooth exactly came from. In 1856, von Meyer noted that the specimen was of "Broadfordian" age. In 1889, Lydekker noted that based on its anatomy, the tooth was Kimmeridgian-aged, but this was later disputed by Tarlo in 1960, noting that its round anatomy in cross-section and associated invertebrate fossils suggested that it was possibly Oxfordian. However, more recent studies suggest that fossils found in the vicinity of the holotype tooth, as well as rocks in the iron mine from which it was probably extracted, are more likely to be Callovian-aged. The sedimentary facies still present on the holotype tooth proves that it was preserved in a red iron oolite, which, within the Fricktal region, are rocks that are exclusively dated to the Callovian. However, erroneous references from miners indicated that the specimen would came from the Hauptrogenstein Formation, suggesting a Bajocian to Bathonian age. Although plesiosaurs and ichthyosaurs have been found in this formation, this latter contains rocks that are generally gray in color, thus not fitting with the facies of the Ischyrodon tooth. Two ore beds located around Herznach and Wölflinswil preserve abundant and well-preserved ammonite fossils, corresponding to the Ifenthal Formation and probably also dating from the Callovian. Younger sedimentary rocks dating from the Oxfordian may also contain ooids and can be quite rich in iron. However, these tend to be more grayish to greenish in color.

== See also ==
- List of plesiosaur genera
- Timeline of plesiosaur research
