= Kienberg, Switzerland =

Kienberg
- Municipality
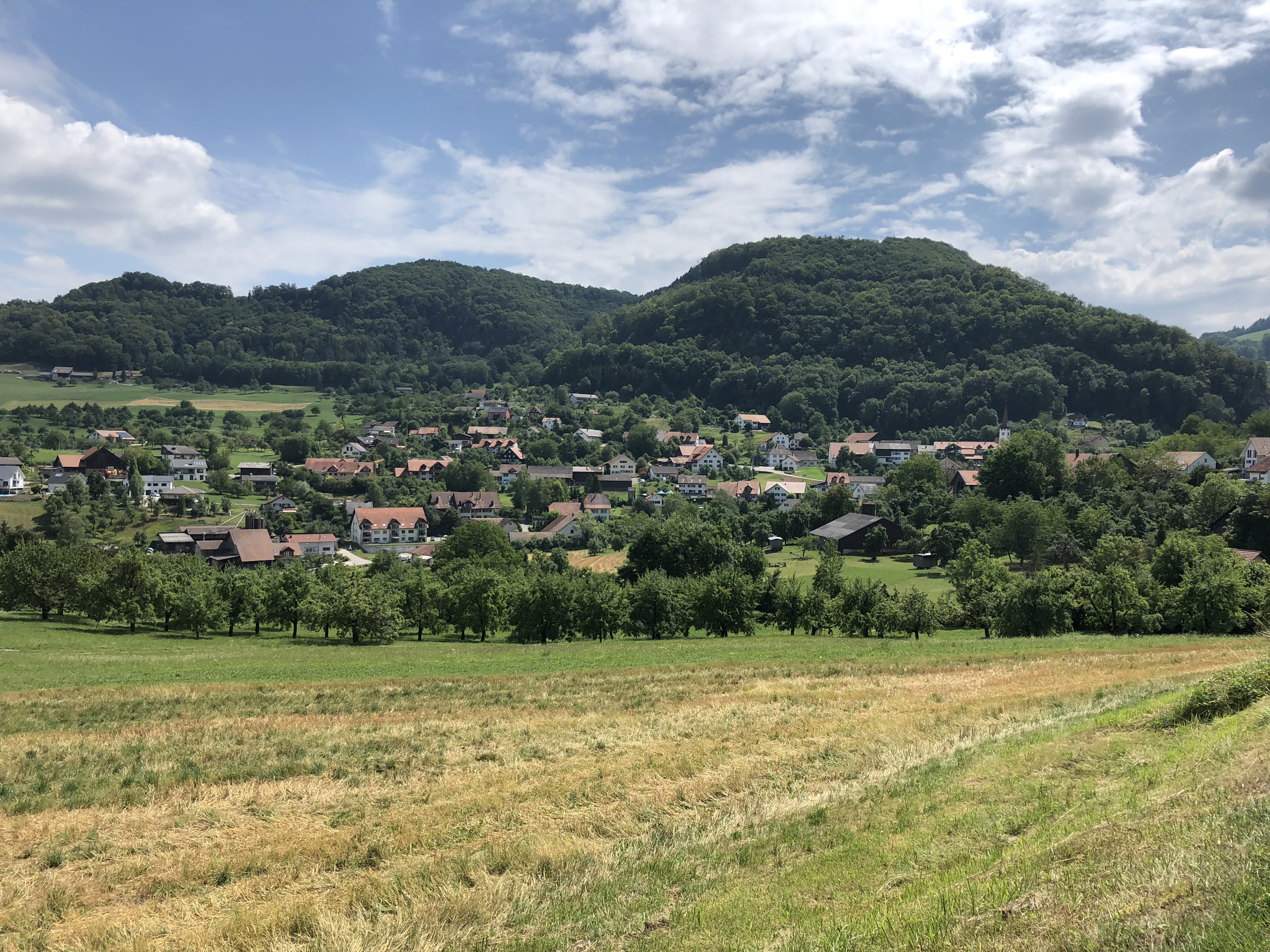
- Kienberg

- Coat of arms
- Location of Kienberg
- Location within Switzerland Location within Canton of Solothurn
- Coordinates: 47°27′N 7°58′E
- Country: Switzerland
- Canton: Solothurn
- District: Gösgen

Area
  - Total: 8.53 km^{2} (3.29 sq mi)
- Elevation: 549 m (1,801 ft)

Population (December 2020)
  - Total: 503
  - Density: 59.0/km^{2} (153/sq mi)
- Time zone: UTC+01:00 (CET)
  - Summer (DST): UTC+02:00 (CEST)
- Postal code: 4468
- SFOS number: 2492
- ISO 3166 code: CH-SO
- Surrounded by: Anwil (BL), Erlinsbach (AG), Obererlinsbach, Oberhof (AG), Oltingen (BL), Wittnau (AG), Wölflinswil (AG)
- Website: www.kienberg.ch

Kienberg (Swiss Standard German pronunciation: [ˈkiːnbɛrɡ]) is a municipality in the district of Gösgen in the canton of Solothurn in Switzerland.

== History ==
Kienberg is first mentioned in 1173 as Vlricus et Hartmannus de Chienberh. In 1276 it was mentioned as dorff ze Kiemberg.

== Geography ==
Aerial view (1953)

Kienberg has an area, as of 2009, of 8.53 square kilometers (3.29 sq mi). Of this area, 4.25 km^{2} (1.64 sq mi) or 49.8% is used for agricultural purposes, while 3.9 km^{2} (1.5 sq mi) or 45.7% is forested. Of the rest of the land, 0.37 km^{2} (0.14 sq mi) or 4.3% is settled (buildings or roads) and 0.03 km^{2} (7.4 acres) or 0.4% is unproductive land.

Of the built up area, housing and buildings made up 2.5% and transportation infrastructure made up 1.5%. Out of the forested land, 41.0% of the total land area is heavily forested and 4.7% is covered with orchards or small clusters of trees. Of the agricultural land, 14.2% is used for growing crops and 31.4% is pastures, while 4.2% is used for orchards or vine crops.

The municipality is located in the Gösgen district, on the border between the Jura Plateau and the Fricktal. It lies on the road over the Salhöhe pass.

== Coat of arms ==
The blazon of the municipal coat of arms is Per bend Sable and Or in the first a Bend sinister Argent.

== Demographics ==
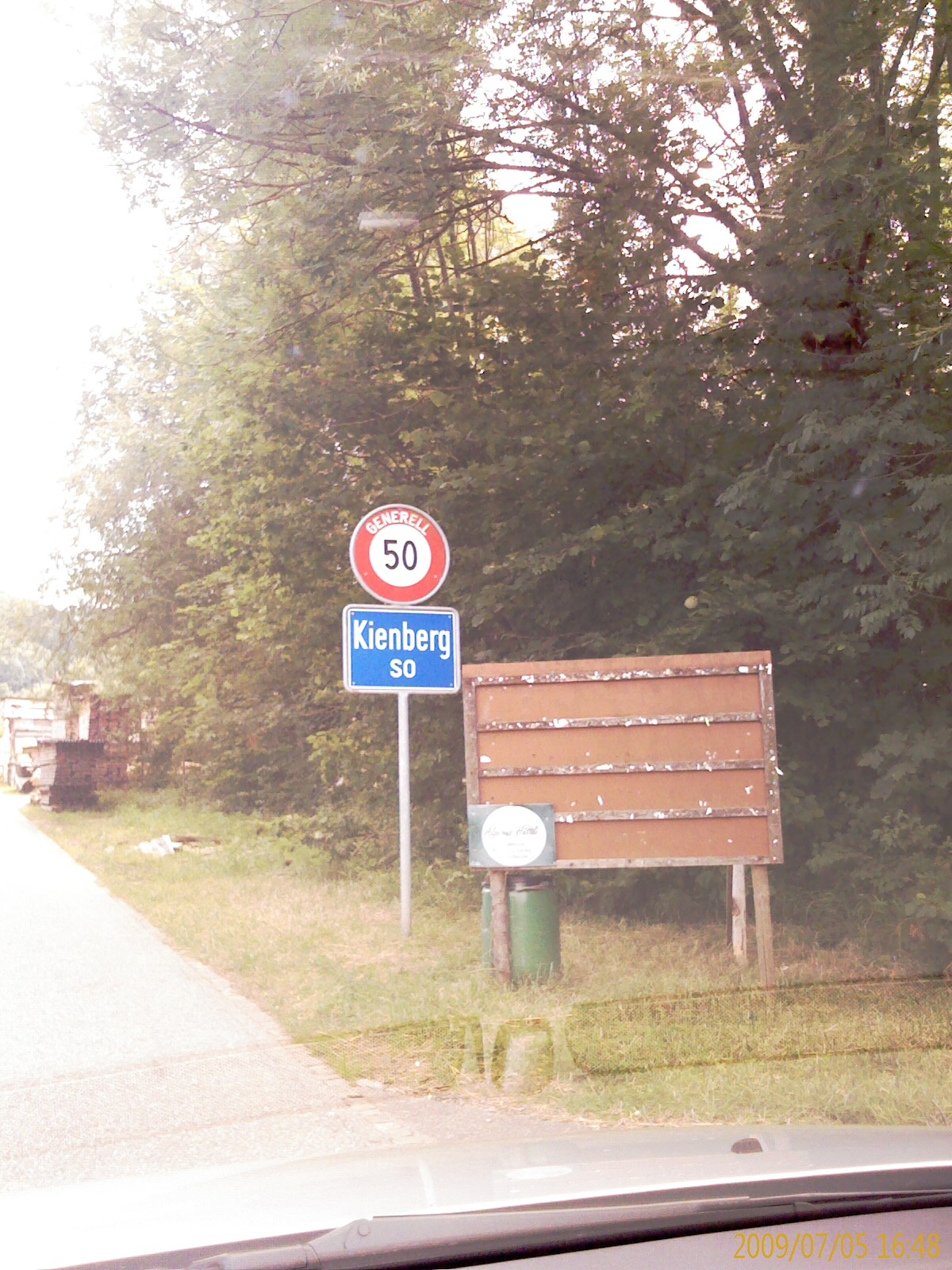
Entrance to Kienberg village

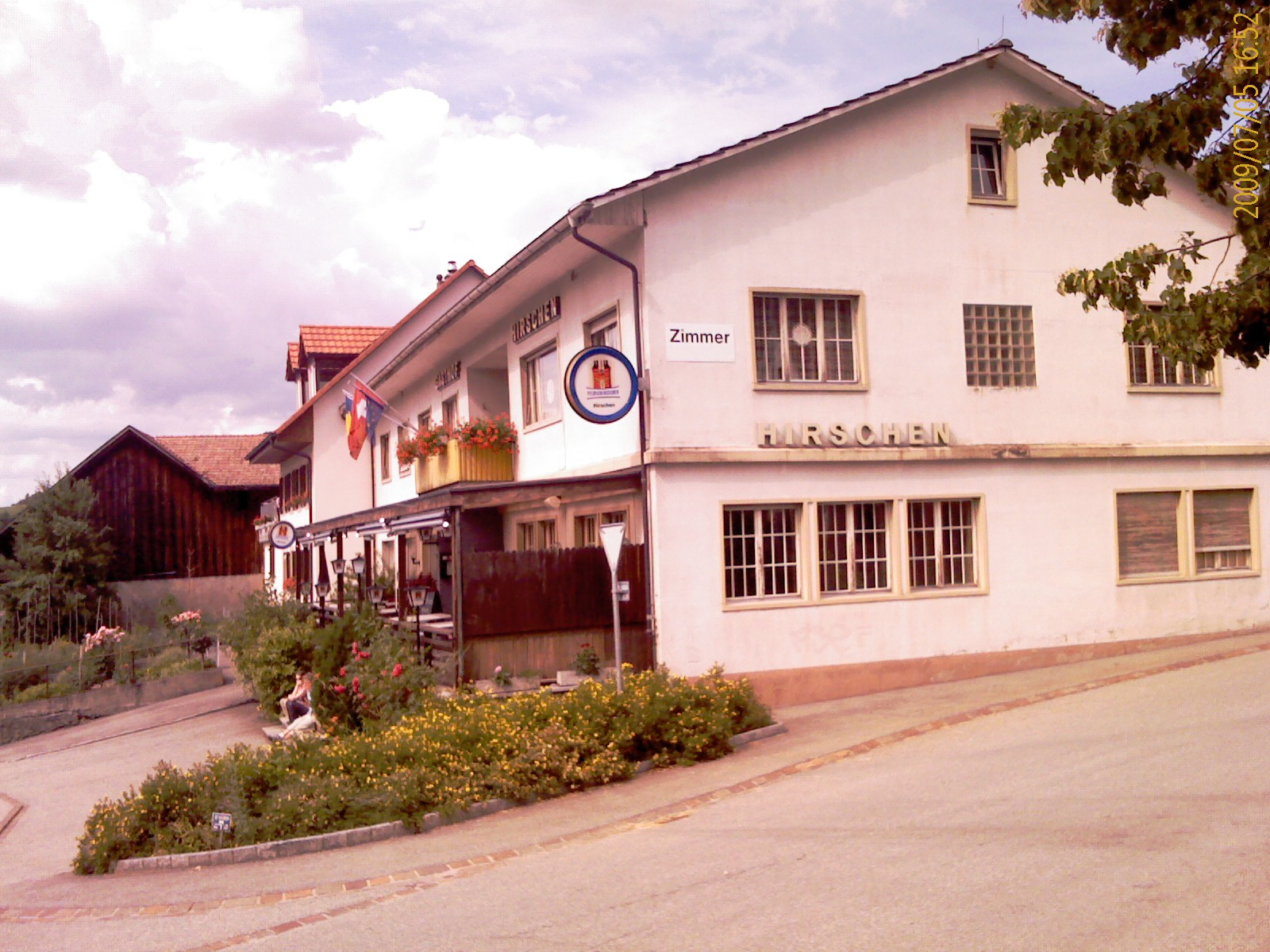
Restaurant Hirschen in Kienberg

Kienberg has a population (as of December 2020) of 503. As of 2008, 5.9% of the population are resident foreign nationals. Over the last 10 years (1999–2009 ) the population has changed at a rate of -8.3%.

Most of the population (as of 2000) speaks German (508 or 97.3%), with French being second most common (4 or 0.8%) and Italian being third (2 or 0.4%).

As of 2008, the gender distribution of the population was 52.3% male and 47.7% female. The population was made up of 240 Swiss men (48.1% of the population) and 21 (4.2%) non-Swiss men. There were 225 Swiss women (45.1%) and 13 (2.6%) non-Swiss women. Of the population in the municipality 222 or about 42.5% were born in Kienberg and lived there in 2000. There were 20 or 3.8% who were born in the same canton, while 229 or 43.9% were born somewhere else in Switzerland, and 34 or 6.5% were born outside of Switzerland.

In 2008 there were 3 live births to Swiss citizens and were 5 deaths of Swiss citizens. Ignoring immigration and emigration, the population of Swiss citizens decreased by 2 while the foreign population remained the same. There were 2 Swiss men who immigrated back to Switzerland. At the same time, there were 3 non-Swiss men and 3 non-Swiss women who immigrated from another country to Switzerland. The total Swiss population change in 2008 (from all sources, including moves across municipal borders) was a decrease of 18 and the non-Swiss population increased by 6 people. This represents a population growth rate of -2.3%.

The age distribution, as of 2000, in Kienberg is; 62 children or 11.9% of the population are between 0 and 6 years old and 91 teenagers or 17.4% are between 7 and 19. Of the adult population, 11 people or 2.1% of the population are between 20 and 24 years old. 176 people or 33.7% are between 25 and 44, and 120 people or 23.0% are between 45 and 64. The senior population distribution is 44 people or 8.4% of the population are between 65 and 79 years old and there are 18 people or 3.4% who are over 80.

As of 2000, there were 228 people who were single and never married in the municipality. There were 243 married individuals, 35 widows or widowers and 16 individuals who are divorced.

As of 2000, there were 198 private households in the municipality, and an average of 2.6 persons per household. There were 55 households that consist of only one person and 24 households with five or more people. Out of a total of 202 households that answered this question, 27.2% were households made up of just one person and there were 3 adults who lived with their parents. Of the rest of the households, there are 54 married couples without children, 76 married couples with children There were 7 single parents with a child or children. There were 3 households that were made up of unrelated people and 4 households that were made up of some sort of institution or another collective housing.

In 2000 there were 70 single family homes (or 47.6% of the total) out of a total of 147 inhabited buildings. There were 17 multi-family buildings (11.6%), along with 54 multi-purpose buildings that were mostly used for housing (36.7%) and 6 other use buildings (commercial or industrial) that also had some housing (4.1%). Of the single family homes 22 were built before 1919, while 16 were built between 1990 and 2000.

In 2000 there were 205 apartments in the municipality. The most common apartment size was 5 rooms of which there were 62. There were 4 single room apartments and 99 apartments with five or more rooms. Of these apartments, a total of 186 apartments (90.7% of the total) were permanently occupied, while 9 apartments (4.4%) were seasonally occupied and 10 apartments (4.9%) were empty. As of 2009, the construction rate of new housing units was 4 new units per 1000 residents. The vacancy rate for the municipality, in 2010, was 2.35%.

The historical population is given in the following chart:

== Politics ==
In the 2007 federal election the most popular party was the SVP which received 33.26% of the vote. The next three most popular parties were the CVP (26.23%), the FDP (21.98%) and the Green Party (10.99%). In the federal election, a total of 200 votes were cast, and the voter turnout was 51.7%.

== Economy ==
As of 2010, Kienberg had an unemployment rate of 2.2%. As of 2008, there were 62 people employed in the primary economic sector and about 21 businesses involved in this sector. 7 people were employed in the secondary sector and there were 4 businesses in this sector. 42 people were employed in the tertiary sector, with 16 businesses in this sector. There were 260 residents of the municipality who were employed in some capacity, of which females made up 37.7% of the workforce.

In 2008 the total number of full-time equivalent jobs was 76. The number of jobs in the primary sector was 42, all of which were in agriculture. The number of jobs in the secondary sector was 6 of which 3 or (50.0%) were in manufacturing and 3 (50.0%) were in construction. The number of jobs in the tertiary sector was 28. In the tertiary sector; 6 or 21.4% were in wholesale or retail sales or the repair of motor vehicles, 13 or 46.4% were in a hotel or restaurant, 1 was in the information industry, 2 or 7.1% were technical professionals or scientists, 4 or 14.3% were in education.

In 2000, there were 17 workers who commuted into the municipality and 169 workers who commuted away. The municipality is a net exporter of workers, with about 9.9 workers leaving the municipality for every one entering. Of the working population, 8.8% used public transportation to get to work, and 61.5% used a private car.

== Religion ==
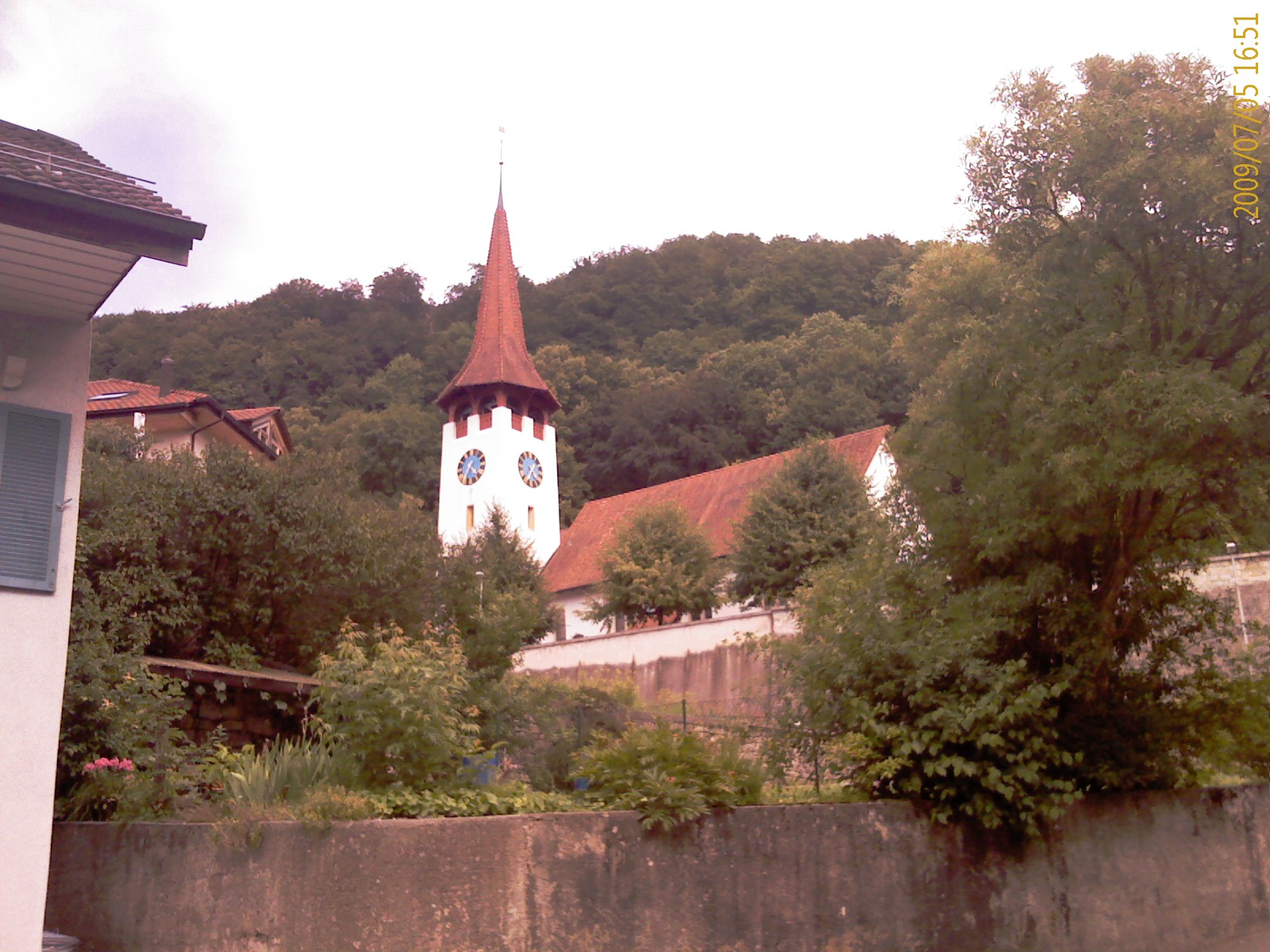
Pastoral Church Mariä Himmelfahrt at Kienberg

From the 2000 census, 247 or 47.3% were Roman Catholic, while 167 or 32.0% belonged to the Swiss Reformed Church. Of the rest of the population, there were 2 individuals (or about 0.38% of the population) who belonged to the Christian Catholic Church, and there were 21 individuals (or about 4.02% of the population) who belonged to another Christian church. There were 2 (or about 0.38% of the population) who were Islamic. 68 (or about 13.03% of the population) belonged to no church, are agnostic or atheist, and 15 individuals (or about 2.87% of the population) did not answer the question.

== Education ==
In Kienberg about 211 or (40.4%) of the population have completed non-mandatory upper secondary education, and 46 or (8.8%) have completed additional higher education (either university or a Fachhochschule). Of the 46 who completed tertiary schooling, 69.6% were Swiss men, 23.9% were Swiss women.

During the 2010-2011 school year there were a total of 33 students in the Kienberg school system. The education system in the Canton of Solothurn allows young children to attend two years of non-obligatory Kindergarten. During that school year, there were 13 children in kindergarten. The canton's school system requires students to attend six years of primary school, with some of the children attending smaller, specialized classes. In the municipality there were 20 students in primary school. The secondary school program consists of three lower, obligatory years of schooling, followed by three to five years of optional, advanced schools. All the lower secondary students from Kienberg attend their school in a neighboring municipality.

As of 2000, there were 42 students from Kienberg who attended schools outside the municipality.
