= Ueken =

- Former municipality
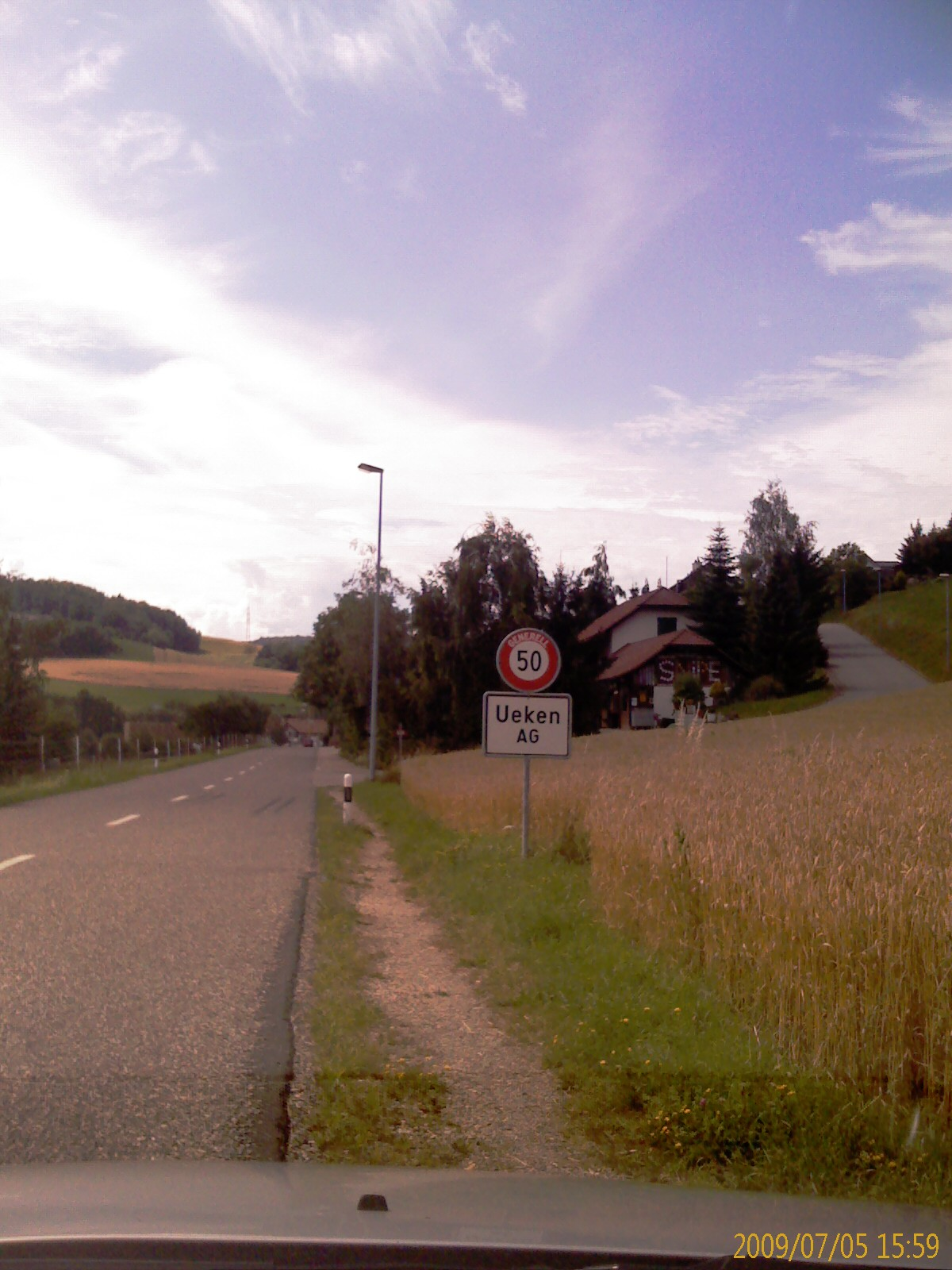

- Flag Coat of arms
- Location of Ueken
- Location within Switzerland Location within Canton of Aargau
- Coordinates: 47°29′N 8°3′E
- Country: Switzerland
- Canton: Aargau
- District: Laufenburg

Area
  - Total: 5.10 km^{2} (1.97 sq mi)
- Elevation: 399 m (1,309 ft)

Population (December 2006)
  - Total: 826
  - Density: 162/km^{2} (419/sq mi)
- Time zone: UTC+01:00 (CET)
  - Summer (DST): UTC+02:00 (CEST)
- Postal code: 5028
- SFOS number: 4179
- ISO 3166 code: CH-AG
- Surrounded by: Frick, Gipf-Oberfrick, Herznach, Hornussen, Zeihen
- Website: www.ueken.ch

Ueken is a former municipality in the district of Laufenburg in the canton of Aargau in Switzerland. On 1 January 2023 the former municipalities of Herznach and Ueken merged to form the new municipality of Herznach-Ueken.

== History ==
In 2015, a farmer discovered coins dating back to the Roman Empire in his garden. The farmer contacted the regional archaeological service and 4,166 coins were excavated. An archaeologist who worked on the excavation described the find as "an exceptional discovery" and "a whole new category which is almost unique." The coins date from the reign of Aurelian in 274 CE to the reign of Maximian in 294 CE. The archaeologists hypothesize that the coins belonged to a tradesman or landowner. The coins will go on display at the Vindonissa de Brugg Museum in Aargau.

== Geography ==
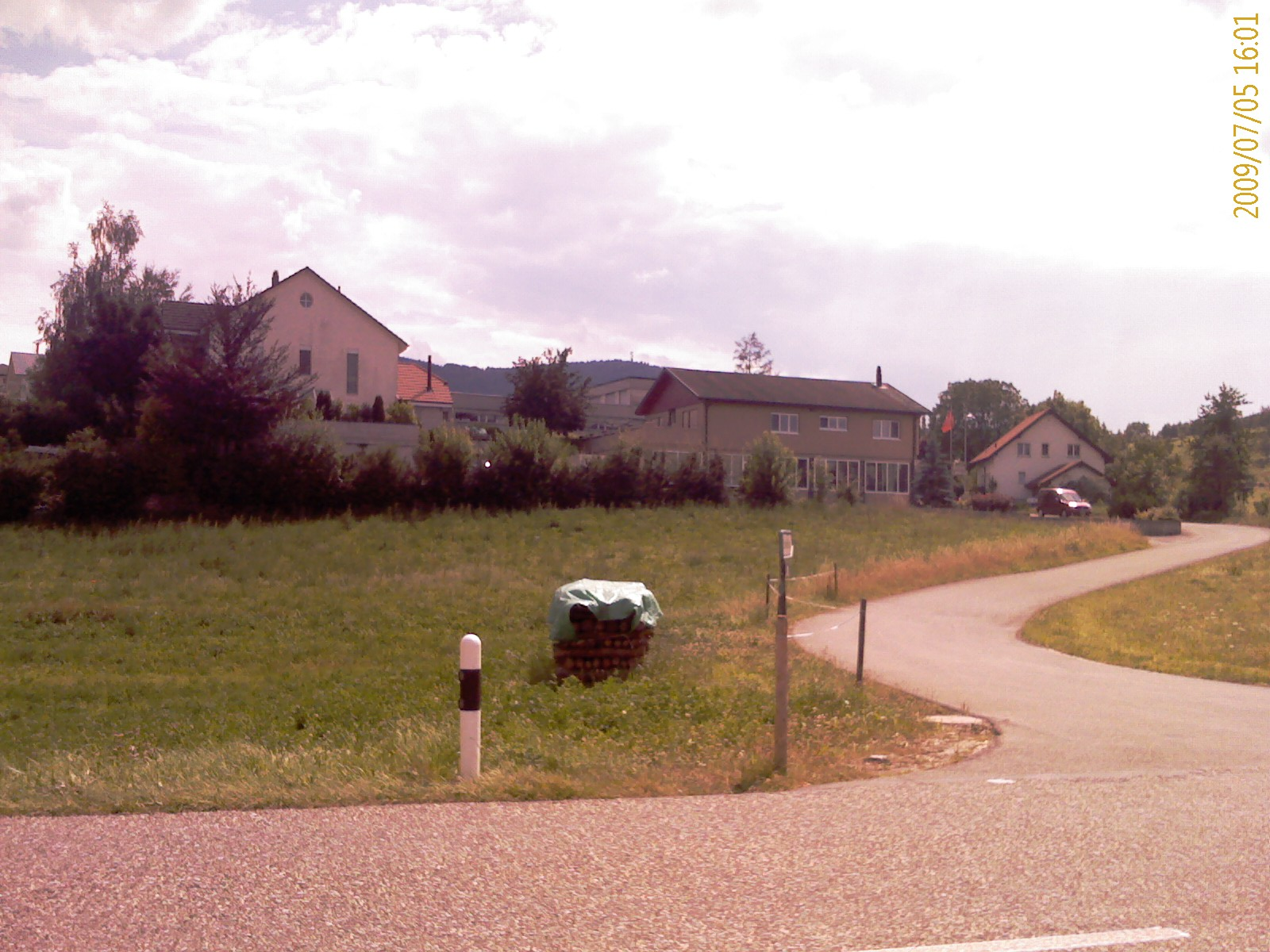
Ueken

Ueken has an area, as of 2009, of 5.1 square kilometers (2.0 sq mi). Of this area, 2.63 km^{2} (1.02 sq mi) or 51.6% is used for agricultural purposes, while 1.97 km^{2} (0.76 sq mi) or 38.6% is forested. Of the rest of the land, 0.47 km^{2} (0.18 sq mi) or 9.2% is settled (buildings or roads), 0.02 km^{2} (4.9 acres) or 0.4% is either rivers or lakes.

Of the built up area, housing and buildings made up 5.5% and transportation infrastructure made up 3.5%. Out of the forested land, 36.5% of the total land area is heavily forested and 2.2% is covered with orchards or small clusters of trees. Of the agricultural land, 37.5% is used for growing crops and 10.4% is pastures, while 3.7% is used for orchards or vine crops. All the water in the municipality is in rivers and streams.

== Coat of arms ==
The blazon of the municipal coat of arms is Or a St.Catherine's Wheel Sable.

== Demographics ==
Ueken has a population (as of December 2020) of 909 As of June 2009, 12.0% of the population are foreign nationals. Over the last 10 years (1997–2007) the population has changed at a rate of 31%. Most of the population (as of 2000) speaks German (94.2%), with English being second most common ( 1.2%) and Albanian being third ( 1.0%).

The age distribution, as of 2008, in Ueken is; 115 children or 13.5% of the population are between 0 and 9 years old and 113 teenagers or 13.2% are between 10 and 19. Of the adult population, 78 people or 9.1% of the population are between 20 and 29 years old. 130 people or 15.2% are between 30 and 39, 182 people or 21.3% are between 40 and 49, and 113 people or 13.2% are between 50 and 59. The senior population distribution is 69 people or 8.1% of the population are between 60 and 69 years old, 35 people or 4.1% are between 70 and 79, there are 15 people or 1.8% who are between 80 and 89, and there are 3 people or 0.4% who are 90 and older.

As of 2000, there were 12 homes with 1 or 2 persons in the household, 112 homes with 3 or 4 persons in the household, and 133 homes with 5 or more persons in the household. As of 2000, there were 266 private households (homes and apartments) in the municipality, and an average of 2.6 persons per household. In 2008 there were 171 single family homes (or 51.0% of the total) out of a total of 335 homes and apartments. There were a total of 2 empty apartments for a 0.6% vacancy rate. As of 2007, the construction rate of new housing units was 4.8 new units per 1000 residents.

In the 2007 federal election the most popular party was the SVP which received 43.7% of the vote. The next three most popular parties were the SP (17%), the CVP (15.2%) and the Green Party (7.3%).

In Ueken about 81.6% of the population (between age 25–64) have completed either non-mandatory upper secondary education or additional higher education (either university or a Fachhochschule). Of the school age population (in the 2008/2009 school year), there are 102 students attending primary school in the municipality.

The historical population is given in the following table:

Historical population
Year	Pop.	±%
1975	369	—
1980	366	−0.8%
1990	476	+30.1%
2000	693	+45.6%

== Economy ==
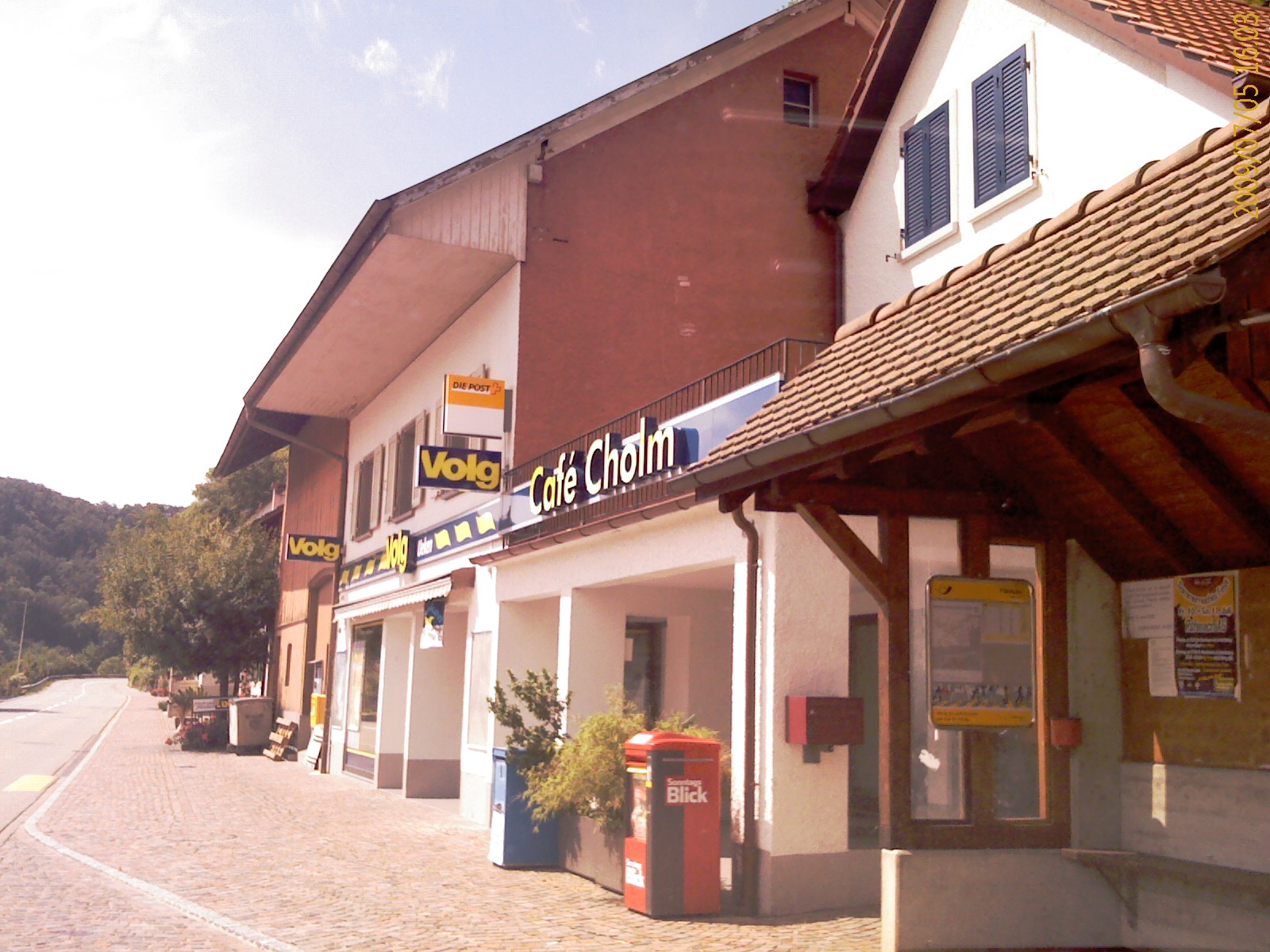
Volg Supermarket in Ueken

As of 2007, Ueken had an unemployment rate of 1.62%. As of 2005, there were 60 people employed in the primary economic sector and about 15 businesses involved in this sector. 9 people are employed in the secondary sector and there are 5 businesses in this sector. 44 people are employed in the tertiary sector, with 16 businesses in this sector.

In 2000 there were 391 workers who lived in the municipality. Of these, 328 or about 83.9% of the residents worked outside Ueken while 23 people commuted into the municipality for work. There were a total of 86 jobs (of at least 6 hours per week) in the municipality. Of the working population, 17.1% used public transportation to get to work, and 61.1% used a private car.

== Religion ==
From the 2000 census, 343 or 49.9% were Roman Catholic, while 187 or 27.2% belonged to the Swiss Reformed Church. Of the rest of the population, there were 7 individuals (or about 1.02% of the population) who belonged to the Christian Catholic faith.
