= Oberhof, Aargau =

Oberhof
- Municipality
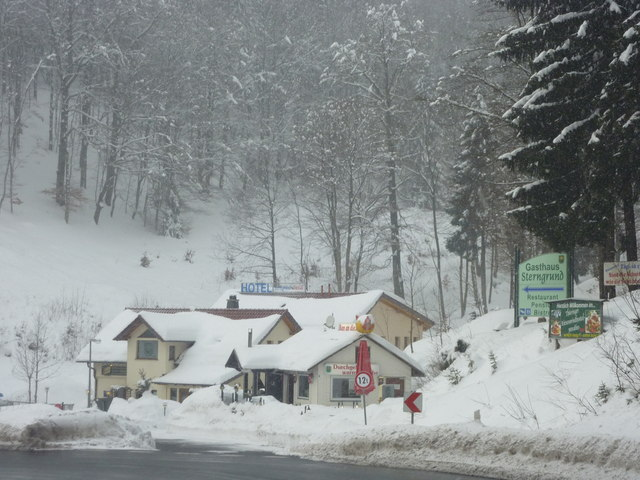

- Flag Coat of arms
- Location of Oberhof
- Location within Switzerland Location within Canton of Aargau
- Coordinates: 47°27′N 8°0′E
- Country: Switzerland
- Canton: Aargau
- District: Laufenburg

Area
  - Total: 8.21 km^{2} (3.17 sq mi)
- Elevation: 472 m (1,549 ft)

Population (December 2006)
  - Total: 564
  - Density: 68.7/km^{2} (178/sq mi)
- Time zone: UTC+01:00 (CET)
  - Summer (DST): UTC+02:00 (CEST)
- Postal code: 5062
- SFOS number: 4173
- ISO 3166 code: CH-AG
- Surrounded by: Densbüren, Erlinsbach, Kienberg (SO), Küttigen, Wölflinswil
- Website: oberhof.ch

Oberhof (Swiss Standard German pronunciation: [ˈoːbərˌhoːf]) is a municipality in the district of Laufenburg in the canton of Aargau in Switzerland.

== History ==
Aerial view (1953)

Oberhof is first mentioned in 1630 as Oberhoff. Oberhof was initially part of the municipality of Wölflinswil. From 1408 until 1797 they were part of the Habsburg District of Rheinfelden. In 1797, Oberhof became part of the French protectorate of Fricktal. Then in 1802 it joined the Canton of Fricktal, which became part of the new Canton of Aargau in 1803. When Oberhof joined Aargau, it was separated from Wölflinswil and joined as a separate municipality.

Ecclesiastically, Oberhof has remained part of the parish of Wöflinswil. In 1818, the chapel of St. Joseph (with a late baroque altar) was built. The chapel was renovated in 1975.

== Geography ==
Oberhof has an area, as of 2009, of 8.21 square kilometers (3.17 sq mi). Of this area, 4.28 km^{2} (1.65 sq mi) or 52.1% is used for agricultural purposes, while 3.4 km^{2} (1.3 sq mi) or 41.4% is forested. Of the rest of the land, 0.48 km^{2} (0.19 sq mi) or 5.8% is settled (buildings or roads).

Of the built up area, housing and buildings made up 2.3% and transportation infrastructure made up 3.3%. Out of the forested land, 39.0% of the total land area is heavily forested and 2.4% is covered with orchards or small clusters of trees. Of the agricultural land, 17.7% is used for growing crops and 30.2% is pastures, while 4.3% is used for orchards or vine crops.

The municipality is located in the Laufenburg district, in the upper Fricktal (Frick river valley) and is on the Benkerjoch Pass road. It consists of the haufendorf village (an irregular, unplanned and quite closely packed village, built around a central square) of Oberhof and the hamlets of Benken (joined the municipality in 1827) as well as several scattered farm houses.

== Coat of arms ==
The blazon of the municipal coat of arms is Azure on a Base invected Vert a House Argent roofed windowed and doored Sable between two Pine Trees of the second trunked proper.

== Demographics ==
Oberhof has a population (as of December 2020) of 570. As of June 2009, 4.1% of the population are foreign nationals. Over the last 10 years (1997–2007) the population has changed at a rate of 11.9%. Most of the population (as of 2000) speaks German (98.2%), with Albanian being second most common ( 1.0%) and French being third ( 0.6%).

The age distribution, as of 2008, in Oberhof is; 73 children or 13.0% of the population are between 0 and 9 years old and 77 teenagers or 13.8% are between 10 and 19. Of the adult population, 57 people or 10.2% of the population are between 20 and 29 years old. 83 people or 14.8% are between 30 and 39, 94 people or 16.8% are between 40 and 49, and 63 people or 11.3% are between 50 and 59. The senior population distribution is 51 people or 9.1% of the population are between 60 and 69 years old, 40 people or 7.1% are between 70 and 79, there are 19 people or 3.4% who are between 80 and 89, and there are 3 people or 0.5% who are 90 and older.

As of 2000 the average number of residents per living room was 0.56 which is about equal to the cantonal average of 0.57 per room. In this case, a room is defined as space of a housing unit of at least 4 m^{2} (43 sq ft) as normal bedrooms, dining rooms, living rooms, kitchens and habitable cellars and attics. About 69.3% of the total households were owner occupied, or in other words did not pay rent (though they may have a mortgage or a rent-to-own agreement).

As of 2000, there were 14 homes with 1 or 2 persons in the household, 70 homes with 3 or 4 persons in the household, and 92 homes with 5 or more persons in the household. As of 2000, there were 184 private households (homes and apartments) in the municipality, and an average of 2.7 persons per household. In 2008 there were 104 single family homes (or 50.5% of the total) out of a total of 206 homes and apartments. There were a total of 1 empty apartments for a 0.5% vacancy rate. As of 2007, the construction rate of new housing units was 1.7 new units per 1000 residents.

In the 2007 federal election the most popular party was the SVP which received 45.3% of the vote. The next three most popular parties were the SP (17.1%), the CVP (15.8%) and the Green Party (7.7%).

In Oberhof about 74.9% of the population (between age 25–64) have completed either non-mandatory upper secondary education or additional higher education (either university or a Fachhochschule). Of the school age population (in the 2008/2009 school year), there are 50 students attending primary school in the municipality.

The historical population is given in the following table:

Historical population
Year	Pop.	±%
1768	295	—
1850	626	+112.2%
1900	487	−22.2%
1950	424	−12.9%
2000	496	+17.0%

== Economy ==
As of 2007, Oberhof had an unemployment rate of 2.14%. As of 2005, there were 89 people employed in the primary economic sector and about 27 businesses involved in this sector. 34 people are employed in the secondary sector and there are 6 businesses in this sector. 24 people are employed in the tertiary sector, with 7 businesses in this sector.

In 2000 there were 246 workers who lived in the municipality. Of these, 190 or about 77.2% of the residents worked outside Oberhof while 26 people commuted into the municipality for work. There were a total of 82 jobs (of at least 6 hours per week) in the municipality. Of the working population, 10.9% used public transportation to get to work, and 53.9% used a private car.

== Religion ==
From the 2000 census, 334 or 67.3% were Roman Catholic, while 105 or 21.2% belonged to the Swiss Reformed Church. Of the rest of the population, there were 4 individuals (or about 0.81% of the population) who belonged to the Christian Catholic faith.
