= Benkerjoch Pass =

Mountain pass in the canton of Aargau in Switzerland

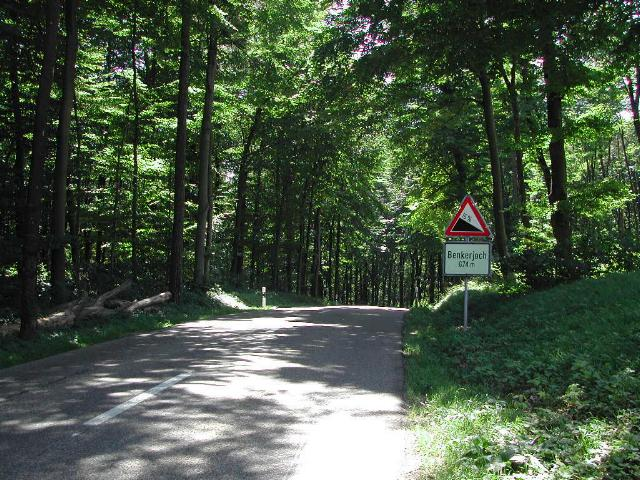
- Road to Benkerjoch Pass
- Interactive map of Benkerjoch Pass
- Elevation: 674 metres (2,211 ft)

Third Approach
- Location: Switzerland
- Coordinates: 47°26′7.67″N 8°1′48.61″E

Benkerjoch Pass (el. 674 m) is a mountain pass in the canton of Aargau in Switzerland.

It connects Küttigen and Oberhof. Until 1801, the pass was the boundary between Austria and Switzerland. The current pass road was built in 1977.

Since 1979, a postal bus route runs over the pass to Aarau.
