= Densbüren =

- Municipality
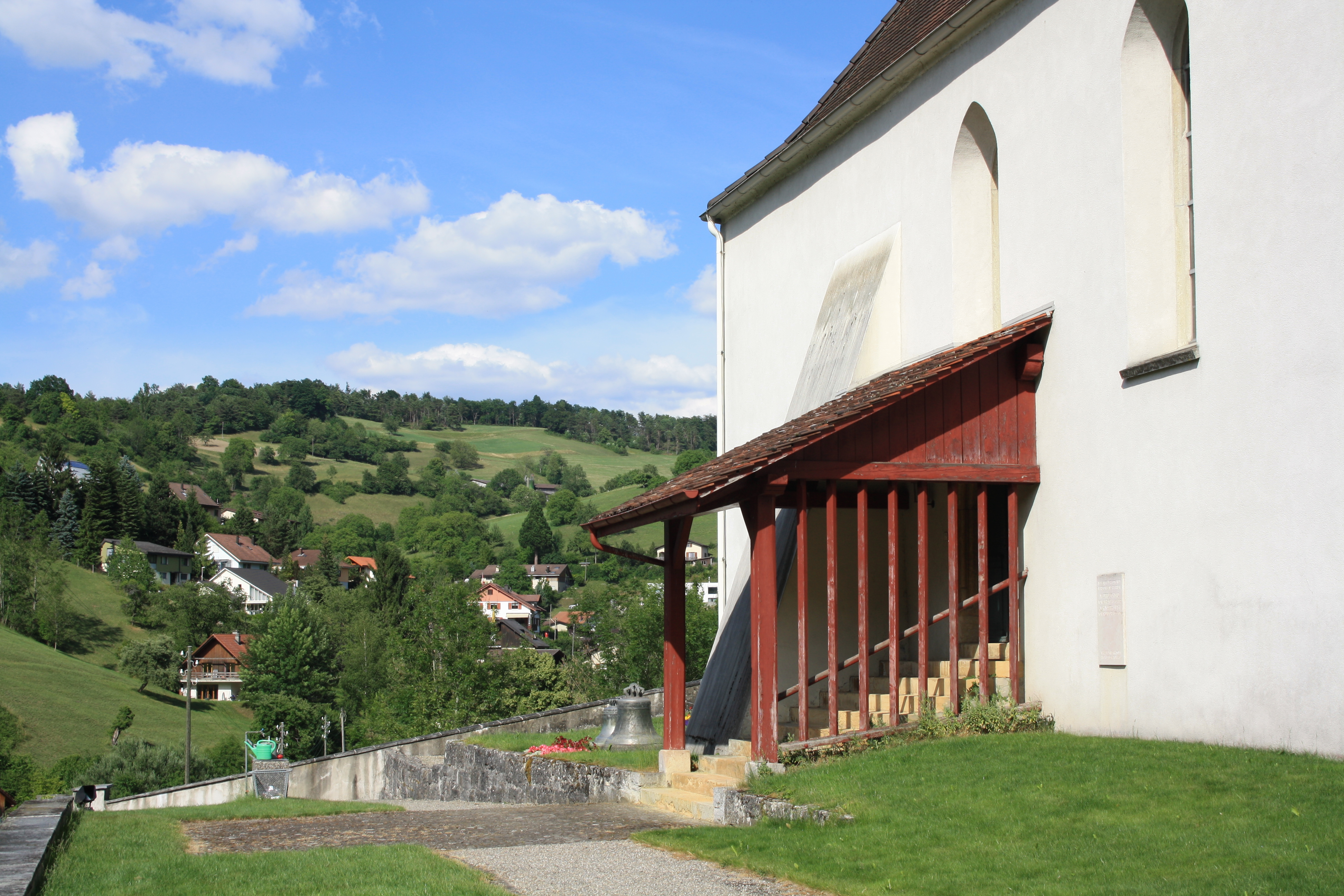

- Flag Coat of arms
- Location of Densbüren
- Location within Switzerland Location within Canton of Aargau
- Coordinates: 47°27′N 8°03′E
- Country: Switzerland
- Canton: Aargau
- District: Aarau

Area
  - Total: 12.52 km^{2} (4.83 sq mi)
- Elevation: 481 m (1,578 ft)

Population (December 2020)
  - Total: 728
  - Density: 58.1/km^{2} (151/sq mi)
- Time zone: UTC+01:00 (CET)
  - Summer (DST): UTC+02:00 (CEST)
- Postal code: 5026
- SFOS number: 4004
- ISO 3166 code: CH-AG
- Localities: Densbüren, Asp
- Surrounded by: Herznach, Küttigen, Oberhof, Thalheim, Wölflinswil, Zeihen
- Website: www.densbueren.ch

Aerial view (1953)

Densbüren is a municipality in the Aarau District of the canton of Aargau in Switzerland.

== History ==
Densbüren is first mentioned in the 14th century as Tensbuirron. In 1426, it was mentioned as Teinspuiren.

== Geography ==
Densbüren has an area, as of 2006, of 12.6 km^{2} (4.9 sq mi). Of this area, 39.2% is used for agricultural purposes, while 55.7% is forested. Of the rest of the land, 4.8% is settled (buildings or roads) and the remainder (0.2%) is non-productive (rivers or lakes).

The municipality is located in the Aarau District on the northern slope of the Staffelegg Pass, a regionally important pass over the Jura Mountains. It consists of the linear village of Densbüren and the hamlets of Asp.

== Coat of arms ==
The blazon of the municipal coat of arms is Argent bordered Gules a Pine Tree Vert issuant from Coupeaux of the same.

== Demographics ==
Densbüren has a population (as of 31 December 2020) of 728. As of 2008, 7.7% of the population was made up of foreign nationals. Over the last 10 years, the population has decreased at a rate of -4.9%. Most of the population (as of 2000) speaks German (98.2%), with Albanian being second most common (0.4%) and Serbo-Croatian being third (0.3%).

The age distribution, as of 2008, in Densbüren is;

Age range in years	Percentage of population	Number of population
0-9	7.8%	56
10-19	15.4%	110
20-29	11.6%	83
30-39	11.0%	79
40-49	17.6%	126
50-59	15.0%	107
60-69	10.3%	74
70-79	7.1%	51
8-89	3.6%	26
90+	0.4%	3

As of 2000, there were 25 homes with 1 or 2 persons in the household, 98 homes with 3 or 4 persons in the household, and 135 homes with 5 or more persons in the household. The average number of people per household was 2.62 individuals. In 2008 there were 151 single family homes (or 49.8% of the total) out of a total of 303 homes and apartments.

In the 2007 federal election the most popular party was the Swiss People's Party which received 52.4% of the vote. The next three most popular parties were the Free Democratic Party (10.5%), the Social Democratic Party (10.3%) and the Christian Democratic People's Party (8%).

In Densbüren about 77.1% of the population (between age 25-64) have completed either non-mandatory upper secondary education or additional higher education (either university or a Fachhochschule). Of the school age population (in the 2008/2009 school year), there are 44 students attending primary school in the municipality.

Historical population
Year	Pop.	±%
1764	469	—
1798	666	+42.0%
1850	1,167	+75.2%
1900	934	−20.0%
1950	772	−17.3%
1980	596	−22.8%
2000	72	−87.9%

The historical population is given in the following table:

== Heritage sites of national significance ==
The ruined castle of Urgiz Castle is listed as a Swiss heritage site of national significance.

== Economy ==
As of 2007, Densbüren had an unemployment rate of 1.42%. As of 2005, there were 81 people employed in the primary economic sector and about 28 businesses involved in this sector. 98 people are employed in the secondary sector and there are 10 businesses in this sector. 88 people are employed in the tertiary sector, with 20 businesses in this sector.

As of 2000 there were a total of 361 workers who lived in the municipality. Of these, 255 or about 70.6% of the residents worked outside Densbüren while 100 people commuted into the municipality for work. There were a total of 206 jobs (of at least 6 hours per week) in the municipality.

== Religion ==
From the 2000 census, 113 or 15.7% are Roman Catholic, while 529 or 73.4% belonged to the Swiss Reformed Church.
