= Herznach =

- Former municipality
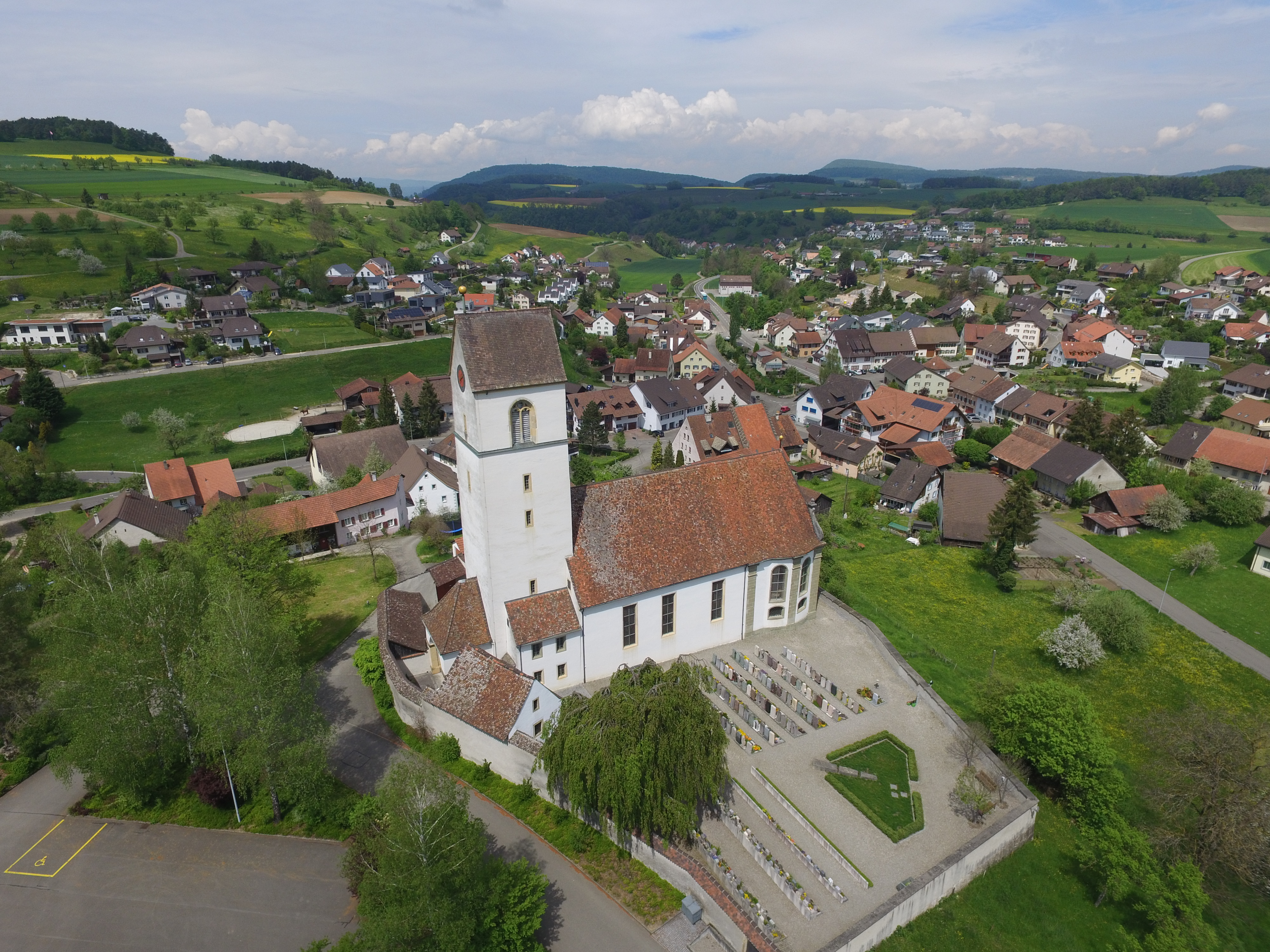
- Herznach village with the St. Nikolaus Church in foreground

- Flag Coat of arms
- Location of Herznach
- Location within Switzerland Location within Canton of Aargau
- Coordinates: 47°29′N 8°3′E
- Country: Switzerland
- Canton: Aargau
- District: Laufenburg

Area
  - Total: 6.28 km^{2} (2.42 sq mi)
- Elevation: 413 m (1,355 ft)

Population (December 2006)
  - Total: 1,229
  - Density: 196/km^{2} (507/sq mi)
- Time zone: UTC+01:00 (CET)
  - Summer (DST): UTC+02:00 (CEST)
- Postal code: 5027
- SFOS number: 4166
- ISO 3166 code: CH-AG
- Surrounded by: Densbüren, Gipf-Oberfrick, Ueken, Wölflinswil, Zeihen
- Website: herznach.ch

Herznach is a former municipality in the district of Laufenburg in the canton of Aargau in Switzerland. On 1 January 2023, the former municipalities of Herznach and Ueken merged to form the new municipality of Herznach-Ueken.

Aerial view (1953)

== History ==
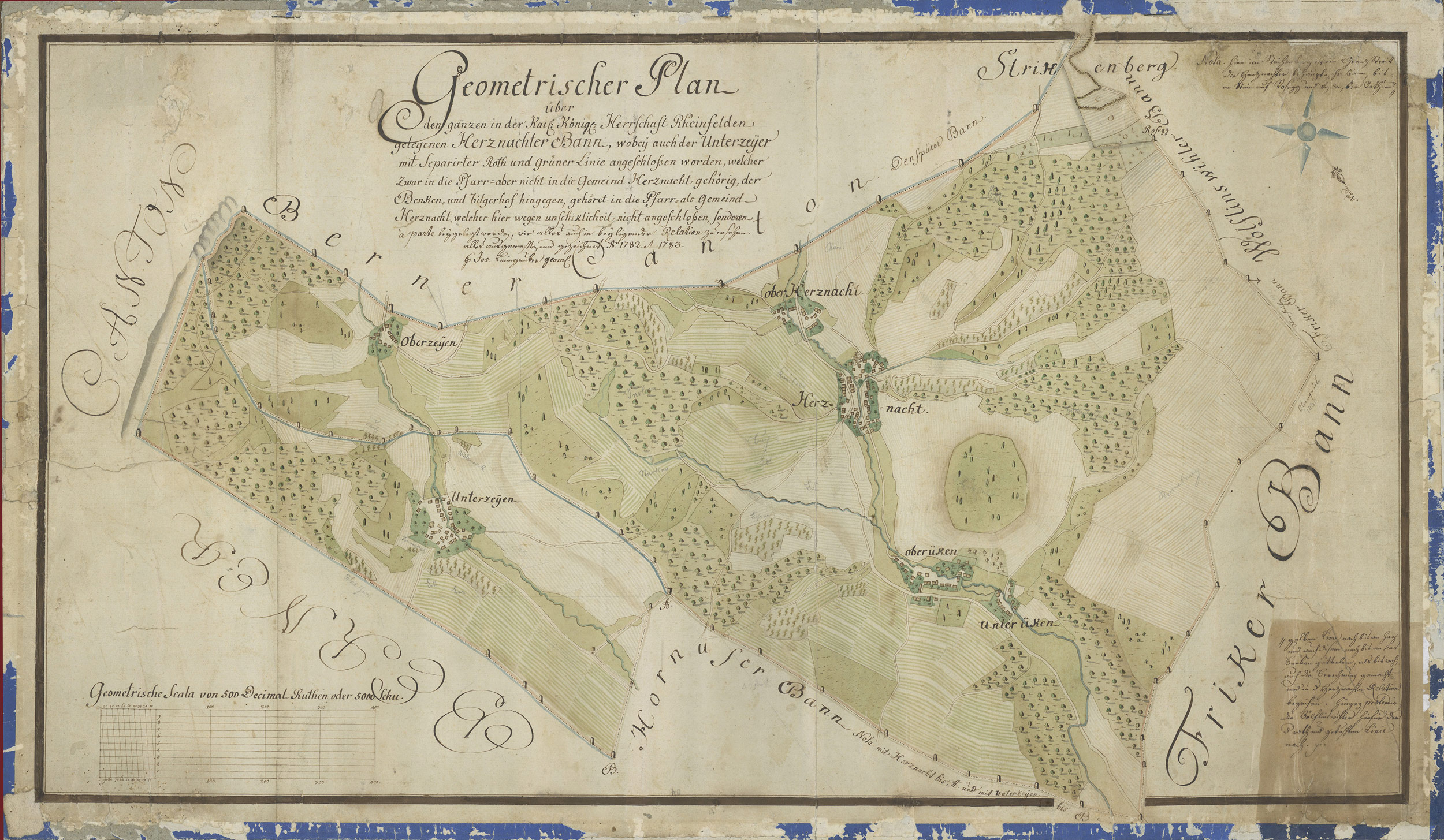
Map of Herznachter Bann in the Austrian District of Rheinfelden, 1782-1783

While some Alamanni era graves have been discovered, the first mention of Herznach is in 1097 as Hercenahc. The Ministerialis (unfree knights in the service of another lord) family von Herznach and Herznach castle are both mentioned. The castle was built on the foundations of a manor house from the 7th-10th Centuries. was built. Originally both Herznach and Ueken were ruled by the Homberger family. In the early 14th Century, the Habsburgs had the right to judge and punish theft and other felonies in Herznach. Between the Imperial Reform (1495) of Maximilian I until the fall of the Ancien Régime (1797) it belonged to the Austrian District of Rheinfelden. The rights to Zwing und Bann (administration of the Commons as well as low justice) were probably in the hands of the village cooperative.

The Church of St. Nicholas, probably a Homburger family church, is first mentioned in 1180. Starting in 1407 the patronage rights were transferred from the Habsburgs to the Collegiate church of Rheinfelden. In 1651 the nave and tower were expanded and renovated, while in 1718-19 the choir was completely rebuilt. The Chapel of Saint Verena was built in 1516 on the foundation of the Early and High Middle Ages manor chapel. Verena newly built chapel on foundations from the early and HochMA and belonged to the manor. Even today, Herznach and Ueken form a parish. Until the Protestant Reformation this parish included Densbüren and the village of Asp and until 1852 it included Zeihen. With the Act of Mediation in 1803, the Fricktal joined the Canton of Aargau and Herznach and Ueken became independent municipalities. The two former population centers Unterherznach (walled church district) and Oberherznach (mill) grew together along the road by 1811.

Starting in the Middle Ages and again during the Second World War there was intensive ore mining in the municipality. In 1967 the mine was shut down. In 1872 a thread factory opened in Herznach and in 1918 it switched to making fabrics. The other factory in Herznach, was built in 1952, and manufactures advertising balloons. At the beginning of the 21st Century Herznach was a farming community with a residential core and two industrial plants.

== Geography ==
Herznach has an area, as of 2009, of 6.28 square kilometers (2.42 sq mi). Of this area, 3.97 km^{2} (1.53 sq mi) or 63.2% is used for agricultural purposes, while 1.54 km^{2} (0.59 sq mi) or 24.5% is forested. Of the rest of the land, 0.72 km^{2} (0.28 sq mi) or 11.5% is settled (buildings or roads), and 0.02 km^{2} (4.9 acres) or 0.3% is either rivers or lakes.

Of the built-up area, housing and buildings comprise 8.1% and transportation infrastructure comprises 2.9%. 22.5% of the total land area is heavily forested, and 2.1% is covered with orchards or small clusters of trees. Of the agricultural land, 39.8% is used for growing crops and 17.4% is pastures, while 6.1% is used for orchards or vine crops. All the water in the municipality is in rivers and streams.

The municipality is located in the Laufenburg district in the upper Fricktal (Frick river valley). It lies on the old road over the Staffelegg to Aarau. It consists of the linear village of Herznach and, until 1852, the hamlet of Oberzeihen (now part of Zeihen).

== Coat of arms ==
The blazon of the municipal coat of arms is Gules a Pitcher Vert lip dexter and handled Or. The pitcher on the coat of arms is an attribute of Saint Verena, to whom the chapel of Herznach is devoted.

== Demographics ==
Herznach has a population (as of December 2020) of 1,568. As of June 2009, 9.6% of the population is foreign nationals. Over the last 10 years (1997–2007), the population has changed at a rate of 20.1%. Most of the population (as of 2000) speaks German (96.5%), with Albanian being the second most common (1.7%) and English being the third (0.5%).

The age distribution, as of 2008, in Herznach is: 160 children or 12.4% of the population are between 0 and 9 years old, and 170 teenagers or 13.2% are between 10 and 19. Of the adult population, 167 people or 12.9% of the population, are between 20 and 29 years old. 172 people or 13.3% are between 30 and 39, 211 people or 16.4% are between 40 and 49, and 201 people or 15.6% are between 50 and 59. The senior population distribution is 112 people or 8.7% of the population are between 60 and 69 years old, 56 people or 4.3% are between 70 and 79, there are 36 people or 2.8% who are between 80 and 89, and there are 5 people or 0.4% who are 90 and older.

As of 2000, the average number of residents per living room was 0.57, which is about equal to the cantonal average of 0.57 per room. In this case, a room is defined as a space of a housing unit of at least 4 m^{2} (43 sq ft) as normal bedrooms, dining rooms, living rooms, kitchens and habitable cellars and attics. About 70.4% of the total households were owner-occupied, or in other words, did not pay rent (though they may have a mortgage or a rent-to-own agreement).

As of 2000, there were 28 homes with 1 or 2 persons in the household, 150 homes with 3 or 4 persons in the household, and 207 homes with 5 or more persons in the household. As of 2000, there were 390 private households (homes and apartments) in the municipality, and an average of 2.7 persons per household. In 2008, there were 281 single-family homes (or 56.0% of the total) out of a total of 502 homes and apartments. There were a total of 1 empty apartments for a 0.2% vacancy rate. As of 2007, the construction rate of new housing units was 1.6 new units per 1000 residents.

In the 2007 federal election, the most popular party was the SVP, which received 41.5% of the vote. The next three most popular parties were the CVP (18.8%), the SP (11.5%) and the FDP (10.5%).

The historical population is given in the following table:

Historical population
Year	Pop.	±%
1768	478	—
1850	898	+87.9%
1860	711	−20.8%
1900	639	−10.1%
1950	665	+4.1%
2000	1,059	+59.2%

== Heritage sites of national significance ==
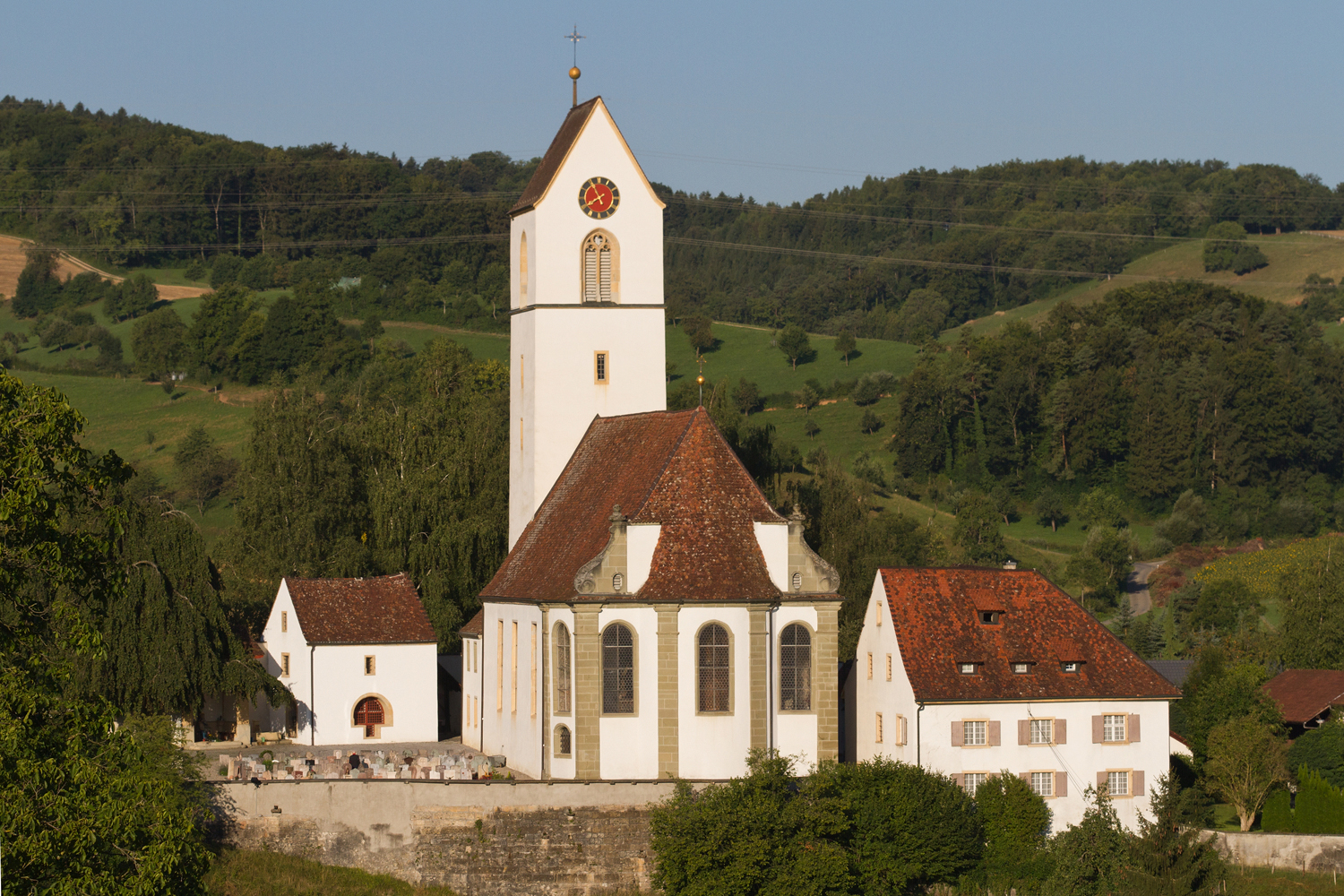
St. Nikolaus Church

The Roman Catholic church St. Nikolaus with its mortuary and church treasure is listed as a Swiss heritage site of national significance.

== Economy ==
As of 2007, Herznach had an unemployment rate of 1.56%. As of 2005, there were 71 people employed in the primary economic sector and about 28 businesses involved in this sector. 122 people were employed in the secondary sector, and 13 businesses were in this sector. 125 people were employed in the tertiary sector, and 24 businesses were in this sector. In 2000, 524 workers lived in the municipality. Of these, 381 or approximately 72.7% of the residents worked outside Herznach, while 158 people commuted into the municipality for work. There was a total of 301 jobs (of at least 6 hours per week) in the municipality. Of the working population, 17.3% used public transportation to get to work, and 53.1% used a private car.

== Religion ==
According to the 2000 census, 620 or 58.5% were Roman Catholic, while 328 or 31.0% belonged to the Swiss Reformed Church. Of the rest of the population, there were 6 individuals (or about 0.57% of the population) who belonged to the Christian Catholic faith.

== Education ==
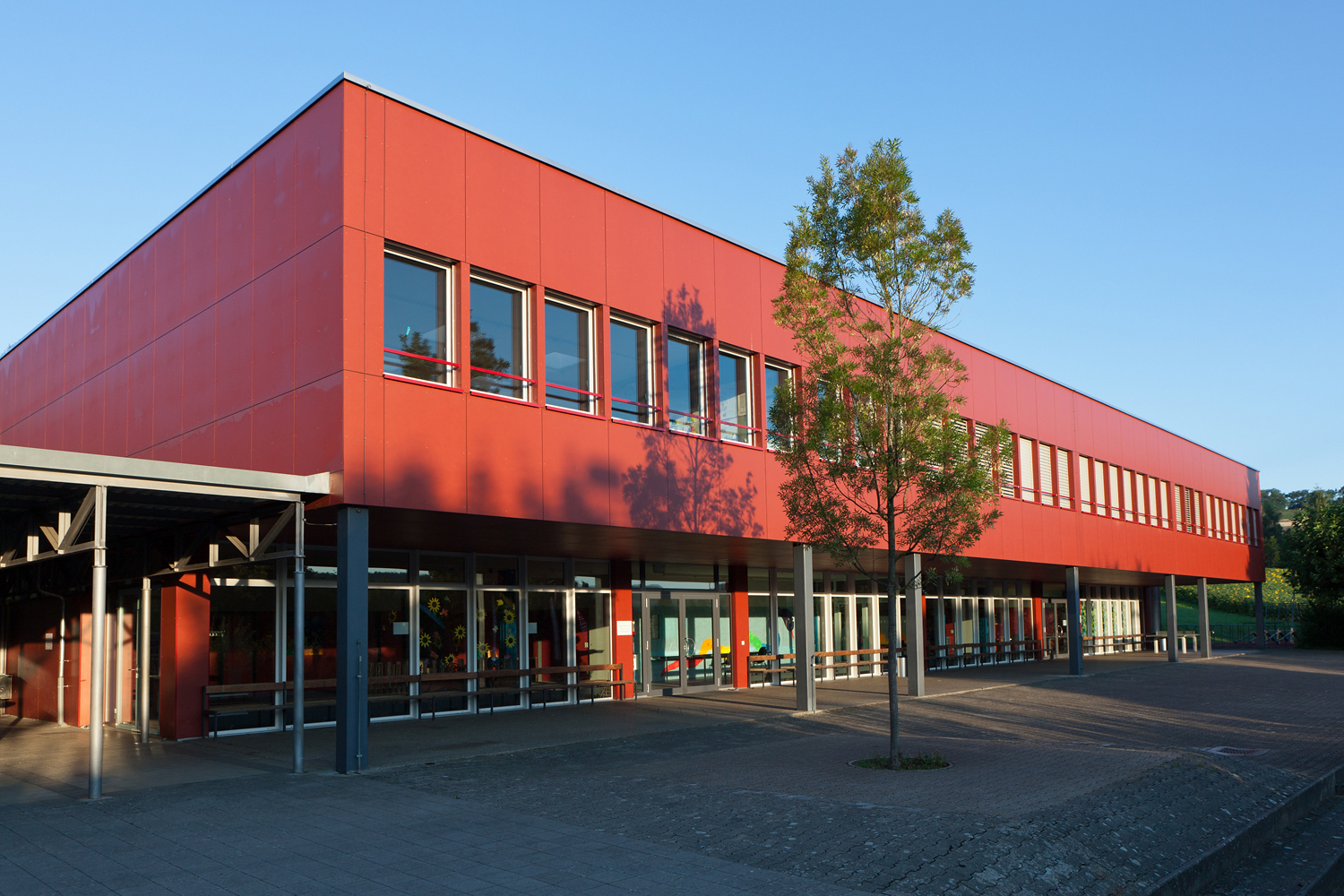
Primary School in Herznach

In Herznach about 86.9% of the population (between age 25–64) have completed either non-mandatory upper secondary education or additional higher education (either university or a Fachhochschule). Of the school age population (in the 2008/2009 school year), there are 112 students attending primary school in the municipality.
