= Gipf-Oberfrick =

- Municipality
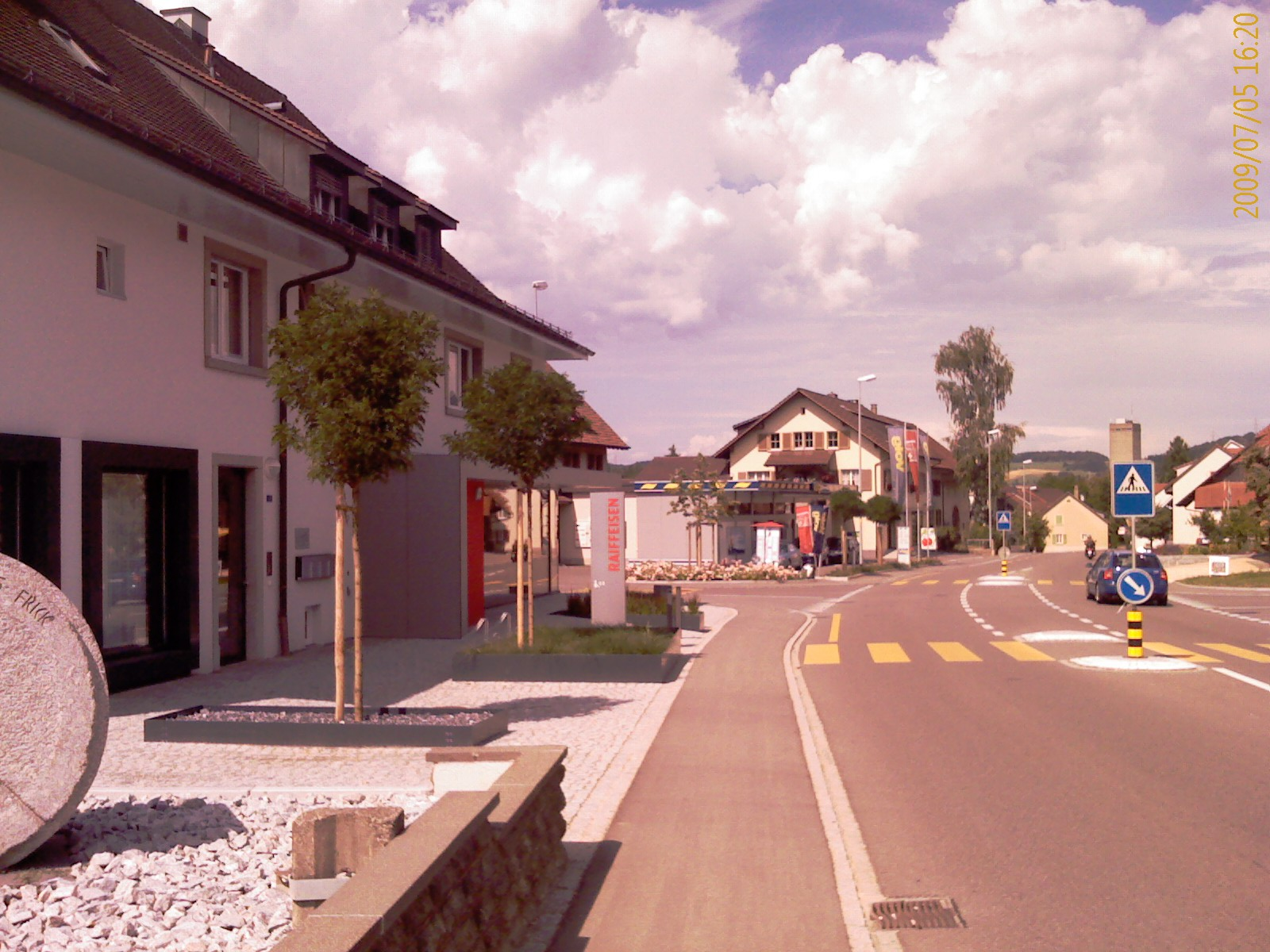

- Flag Coat of arms
- Location of Gipf-Oberfrick
- Location within Switzerland Location within Canton of Aargau
- Coordinates: 47°30′N 8°0′E
- Country: Switzerland
- Canton: Aargau
- District: Laufenburg

Area
  - Total: 10.18 km^{2} (3.93 sq mi)
- Elevation: 369 m (1,211 ft)

Population (December 2006)
  - Total: 3,111
  - Density: 305.6/km^{2} (791.5/sq mi)
- Time zone: UTC+01:00 (CET)
  - Summer (DST): UTC+02:00 (CEST)
- Postal code: 5073
- SFOS number: 4165
- ISO 3166 code: CH-AG
- Surrounded by: Frick, Herznach, Schupfart, Ueken, Wegenstetten, Wittnau, Wölflinswil
- Website: gipf-oberfrick.ch

Gipf-Oberfrick is a municipality in the district of Laufenburg in the canton of Aargau in Switzerland.

Aerial view (1950)

== History ==
Discoveries in the area that would become Gipf-Oberfrick indicated that there were several earlier settlements. These finds include; several Bronze Age items, La Tène culture graves and Roman era buildings and a farm house from the 1st to 4th Centuries. The modern village of Gipf is first mentioned in 1259 as Cubibe. In 1276 it was mentioned as Gipff, and in 1278 as Guffpha. In 1288 Oberfrick was mentioned as Obiren Vrieche. At one time the castle of Alt-Thierstein was above the village on the Tiersteinberg. The castle is now a ruin. Before 1232 the village was owned by the count of Homberg-Thierstein. After 1232 it came under the authority of the lords of Frick, a Habsburg vassal. In 1406 the Lords of Eptingen acquired the village and then later it came to the city of Basel. In 1534 the rights to the village fell back to Austria and it became part of the district of Fricktal. It remained under Habsburgs until 1797. Frick, Oberfrick and Gipf formed a municipal court (bailiwick). This court had the authority over Zwing und Bann within the three villages, making the bailiwick self-governing on minor issues. The area suffered great destruction in the Thirty Years War. After the Act of Mediation in 1803, the Confederation of Fricktal joined the Swiss Confederation. At that time, the former bailiwick was divided into the municipalities of Frick and Gipf-Oberfrick.

Gipf and Frick were united in one parish, until 1953, when an independent Gipf-Oberfrick parish was created. St. Wendelin's chapel was built in 1708, and a parish church was built in 1968–70.

== Geography ==
Gipf-Oberfrick has an area, as of 2009, of 10.18 square kilometers (3.93 sq mi). Of this area, 5 km^{2} (1.9 sq mi) or 49.1% is used for agricultural purposes, while 4.14 km^{2} (1.60 sq mi) or 40.7% is forested. Of the rest of the land, 1.03 km^{2} (0.40 sq mi) or 10.1% is settled (buildings or roads), 0.03 km^{2} (7.4 acres) or 0.3% is either rivers or lakes.

Of the built up area, housing and buildings made up 6.7% and transportation infrastructure made up 2.7%. 38.4% of the total land area is heavily forested and 2.3% is covered with orchards or small clusters of trees. Of the agricultural land, 24.8% is used for growing crops and 18.9% is pastures, while 5.5% is used for orchards or vine crops. All the water in the municipality is in rivers and streams.

The municipality is located in the Laufenburg district, in the upper Fricktal (Frick river valley). It consists of the villages of Gipf and Oberfrick.

== Coat of arms ==
The blazon of the municipal coat of arms is Or a Doe Gules statant on Coupeaux Vert

== Demographics ==
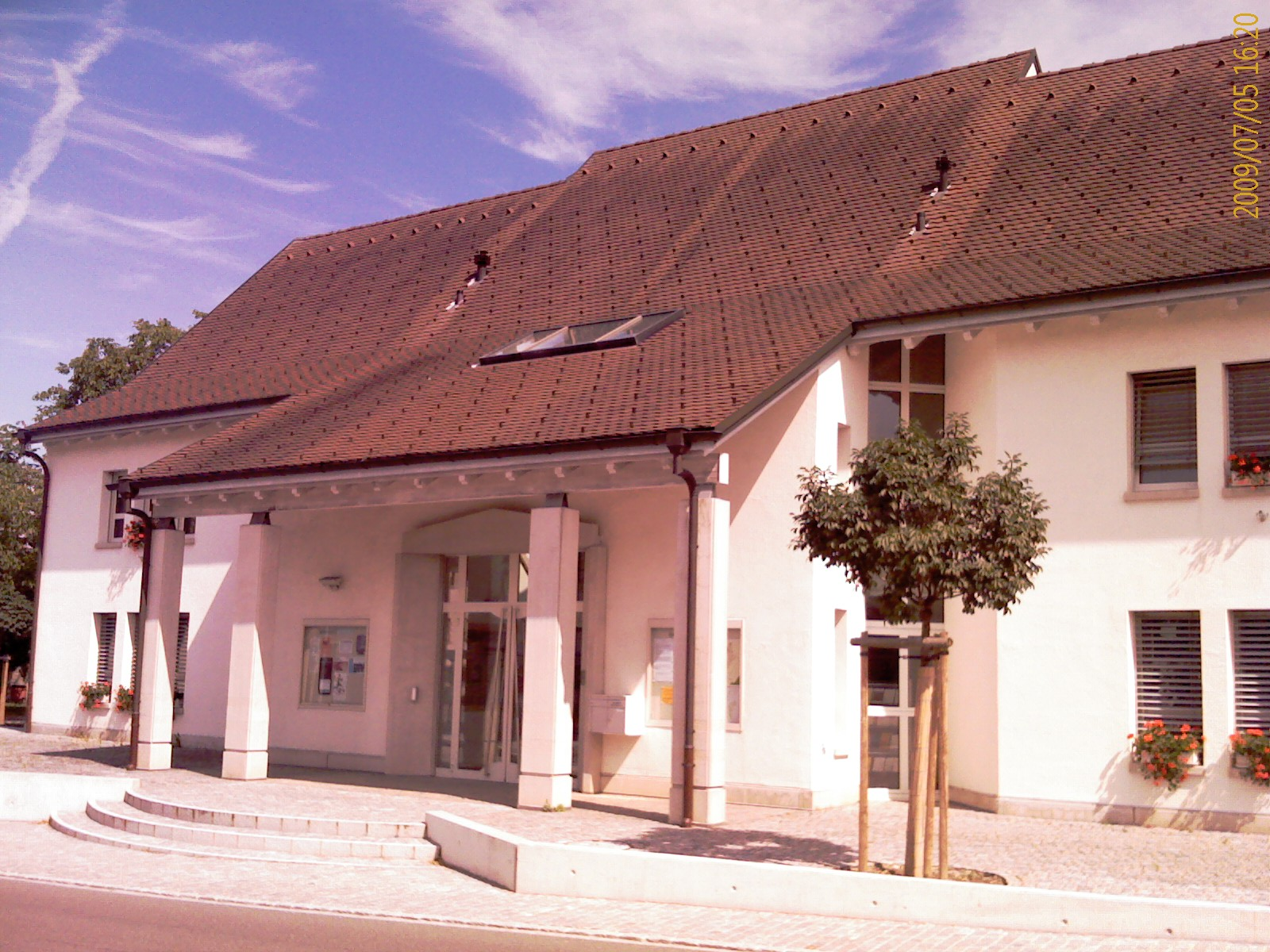
Municipal building of Gipf-Oberfrick

Gipf-Oberfrick has a population (as of December 2020) of 3,731. As of June 2009, 10.6% of the population are foreign nationals. Over the last 10 years (1997–2007) the population has changed at a rate of 21.8%. Most of the population (as of 2000) speaks German (93.9%), with Albanian being second most common ( 1.1%) and Italian being third ( 0.9%).

The age distribution, as of 2008, in Gipf-Oberfrick is; 340 children or 10.7% of the population are between 0 and 9 years old and 420 teenagers or 13.2% are between 10 and 19. Of the adult population, 412 people or 12.9% of the population are between 20 and 29 years old. 415 people or 13.0% are between 30 and 39, 603 people or 18.9% are between 40 and 49, and 438 people or 13.7% are between 50 and 59. The senior population distribution is 320 people or 10.0% of the population are between 60 and 69 years old, 151 people or 4.7% are between 70 and 79, there are 77 people or 2.4% who are between 80 and 89, and there are 12 people or 0.4% who are 90 and older.

As of 2000 the average number of residents per living room was 0.57 which is about equal to the cantonal average of 0.57 per room. In this case, a room is defined as space of a housing unit of at least 4 m^{2} (43 sq ft) as normal bedrooms, dining rooms, living rooms, kitchens and habitable cellars and attics. About 63% of the total households were owner occupied, or in other words did not pay rent (though they may have a mortgage or a rent-to-own agreement).

As of 2000, there were 79 homes with 1 or 2 persons in the household, 459 homes with 3 or 4 persons in the household, and 497 homes with 5 or more persons in the household. As of 2000, there were 1,074 private households (homes and apartments) in the municipality, and an average of 2.6 persons per household. In 2008 there were 590 single family homes (or 45.1% of the total) out of a total of 1,308 homes and apartments. There were a total of 73 empty apartments for a 5.6% vacancy rate. As of 2007, the construction rate of new housing units was 5.1 new units per 1000 residents.

In the 2007 federal election the most popular party was the SVP which received 30.4% of the vote. The next three most popular parties were the SP (21.1%), the CVP (17.9%) and the FDP (10.3%).

The entire Swiss population is generally well educated. In Gipf-Oberfrick about 82.1% of the population (between age 25–64) have completed either non-mandatory upper secondary education or additional higher education (either university or a Fachhochschule). Of the school age population (in the 2008/2009 school year), there are 262 students attending primary school, there are 164 students attending secondary school in the municipality.

The historical population is given in the following table:

Historical population
Year	Pop.	±%
1768	588	—
1850	1,050	+78.6%
1900	851	−19.0%
1950	954	+12.1%
2000	2,808	+194.3%
2018	3,542	+26.1%

== Heritage sites of national significance ==
The ruins of Alt-Thierstein castle is listed as a Swiss heritage site of national significance.

== Economy ==
As of 2007, Gipf-Oberfrick had an unemployment rate of 1.83%. As of 2005, there were 129 people employed in the primary economic sector and about 38 businesses involved in this sector. 141 people are employed in the secondary sector and there are 18 businesses in this sector. 341 people are employed in the tertiary sector, with 74 businesses in this sector.

In 2000 there were 1,498 workers who lived in the municipality. Of these, 1,204 or about 80.4% of the residents worked outside Gipf-Oberfrick while 251 people commuted into the municipality for work. There were a total of 545 jobs (of at least 6 hours per week) in the municipality. Of the working population, 20% used public transportation to get to work, and 47.8% used a private car.

== Religion ==
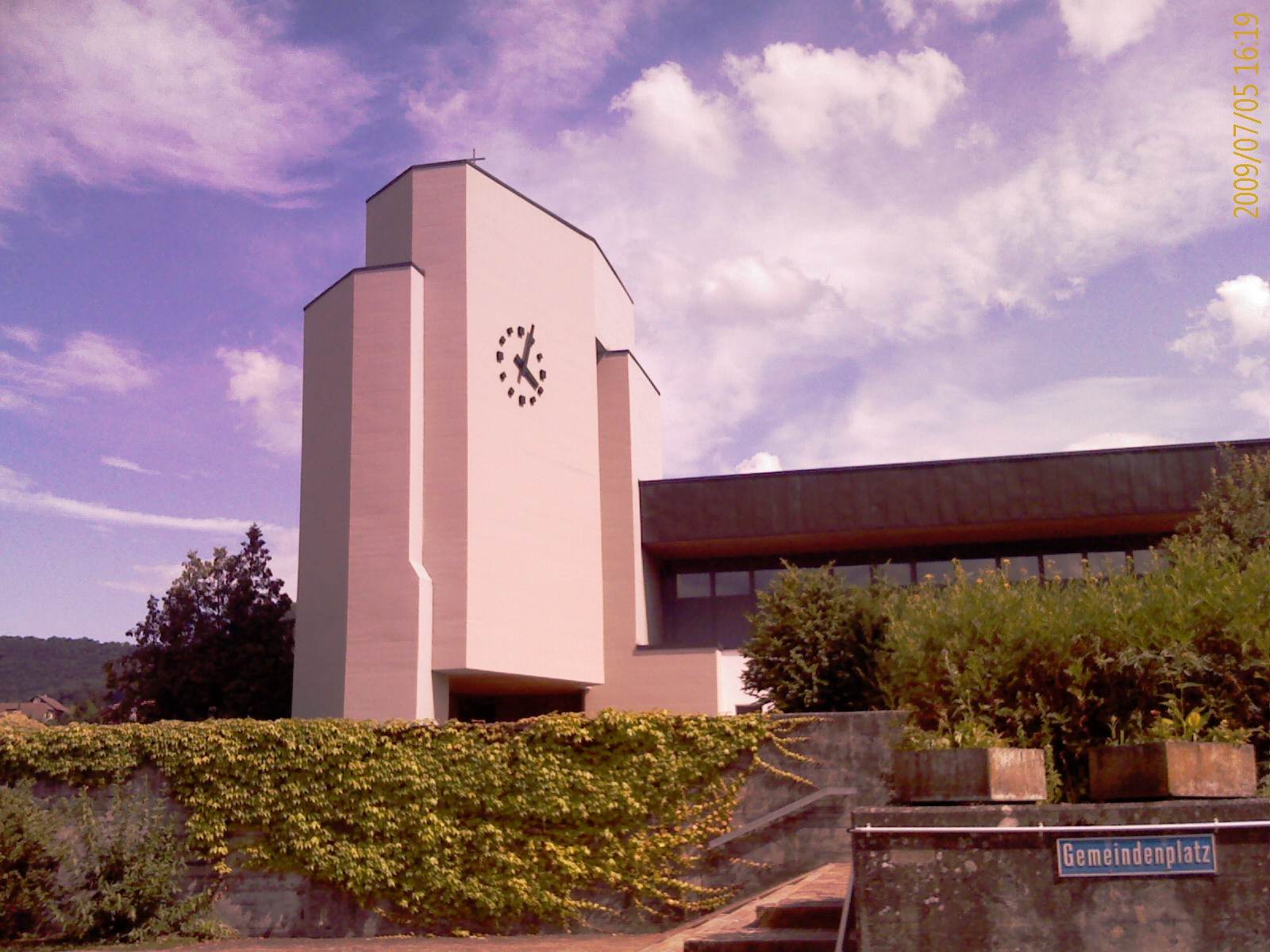
Church of Gipf-Oberfrick

From the 2000 census, 1,528 or 54.4% were Roman Catholic, while 823 or 29.3% belonged to the Swiss Reformed Church. Of the rest of the population, there were 15 individuals (or about 0.53% of the population) who belonged to the Christian Catholic faith.
