= Frick, Aargau =

Frick
- Municipality
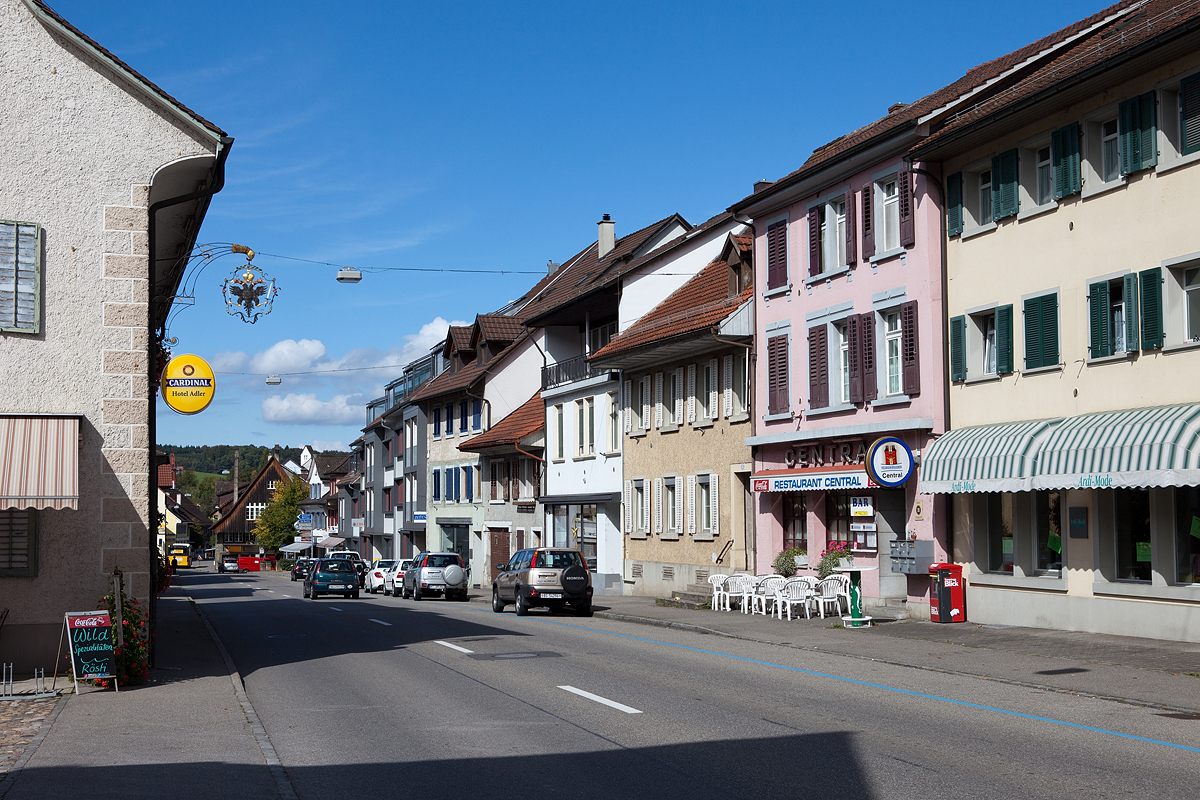

- Flag Coat of arms
- Location of Frick
- Location within Switzerland Location within Canton of Aargau
- Coordinates: 47°31′N 8°1′E
- Country: Switzerland
- Canton: Aargau
- District: Laufenburg

Area
  - Total: 9.96 km^{2} (3.85 sq mi)
- Elevation: 350 m (1,150 ft)

Population (December 2006)
  - Total: 4,594
  - Density: 461/km^{2} (1,190/sq mi)
- Time zone: UTC+01:00 (CET)
  - Summer (DST): UTC+02:00 (CEST)
- Postal code: 5070
- SFOS number: 4163
- ISO 3166 code: CH-AG
- Surrounded by: Eiken, Gipf-Oberfrick, Hornussen, Ittenthal, Kaisten, Oeschgen, Schupfart, Ueken
- Twin towns: Frickingen (Germany)
- Website: www.frick.ch

Frick is a municipality in the district of Laufenburg in the canton of Aargau in Switzerland.

== History ==
=== Prehistory ===
At the nearby Wittnauer Horn, a prehistorical fortification was discovered with objects dating back to the Late Bronze Age.

=== Roman Times ===
A Roman villa was located at the site of the fortification village in the 2nd century, and a small Roman fort was built in the early 4th century to protect the military road from Vindonissa to Augusta Raurica (extended in AD 370). A Roman settlement developed in the vicinity of the fort, replaced by an Alemannic settlement during the 6th to 9th centuries. The Alemannic settlement had a fortified church, the foundations are still visible near the current village church. The name of the village was taken from that of the encompassing region of Frickgau (mentioned as Frichgowe in 926), from a Vulgar Latin [regio] ferraricia, in reference to the iron mine located here in the Roman era (a formation based on Latin ferrāria "iron mine" with the -icius suffix), whence early Romance *Ferrícia, Old High German *Ferríkkea, recorded as Fricho in the 11th century.

=== Middles Ages ===
Starting in the High Middle Ages, Frickgau was owned by the Counts of Homberg-Thierstein. Later, around 1230, it passed to the House of Habsburg, and was overseen by Habsburg ministeriales, known as the lords of Frick, with Gipf, Upper Frick part of Oeschgen, forming the Frick bailiwick (Vogtei) (also called the Homburgeramt). The Homburger Vogt (reeve) was also chief administrator the Fricktal region. The bailiwick was granted special privileges, including the right to elect their reeve, as well as the rights of lower jurisdiction.

The population of the bailiwick were divided into the upper layer of Vollbauern ("full farmers"), as well as in the Halbbauern ("half-farmers", i.e. smallholding farmers) and the Taun (tenants). The Vollbauern included the reeve's family, and were the most privileged. The tenants formed the lowest stratum, with no citizen rights, and represented the largest group numerically in the early modern period.

After the Act of Mediation in 1803, Frick and the rest of the modern Fricktal became part of the newly formed Canton of Aargau. In 1804 the municipalities of Frick and Gipf-Frick were formed.

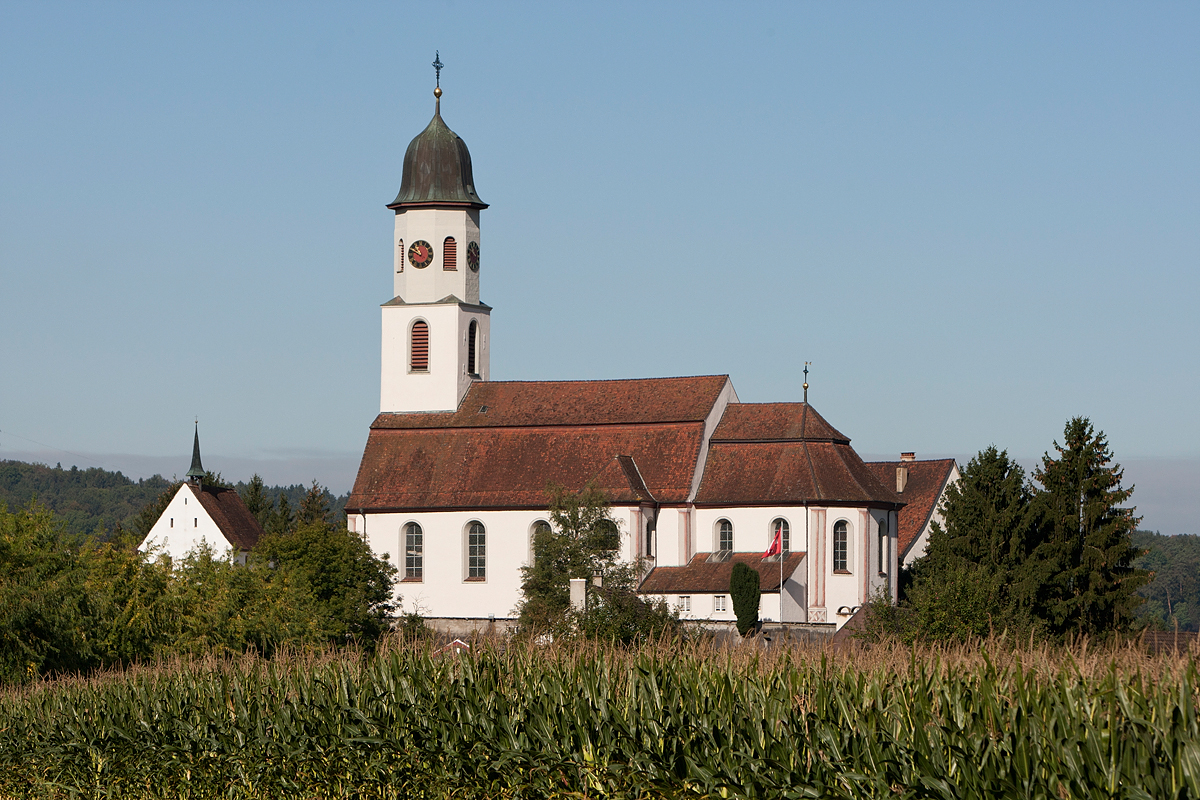

The Church of St. Peter and Paul were probably built as a private church for the Counts of Homberg during the High Middle Ages. In the Thirty Years War, the village was destroyed together with the church. In the mid-14th century the church came under the authority of Steinen Convent in Basel. Then, in 1492 it was granted to Teutonic Knights at Beuggen. The present baroque building is from 1716, and the reformed church is from 1910.

=== Modern Era ===
Aerial view (1958)

The municipal coat of arms, Argent a Wolf salient Gules, was introduced in 1931 based on the historical coat of arms of the Habsburg ministeriales. Before 1931, Frick had used the coat of arms of Fricktal, a green linden leaf in a white field.

The Frick parish comprises ten municipalities and the parish offices are in Frick and Gipf-Oberfrick. The catholic parish, consisting of Frick and Gipf-Oberfrick, has been a separate parish since 1953.

"While dinosaurs were first discovered in the Frick clay pit in 1961—leading to the founding of the Sauriermuseum Frick in 1991—subsequent major excavations, including significant graveyard discoveries in 2007, have continually added to the museum's collection, featuring complete Plateosaurus specimens on display."

In 2013 and 2014 Frick became the Swiss municipality with the highest crime rate, due to the several thousand offences registered in the context of the improper trading case involving ASE Investment, a company with official seat in Frick.

== Geography ==
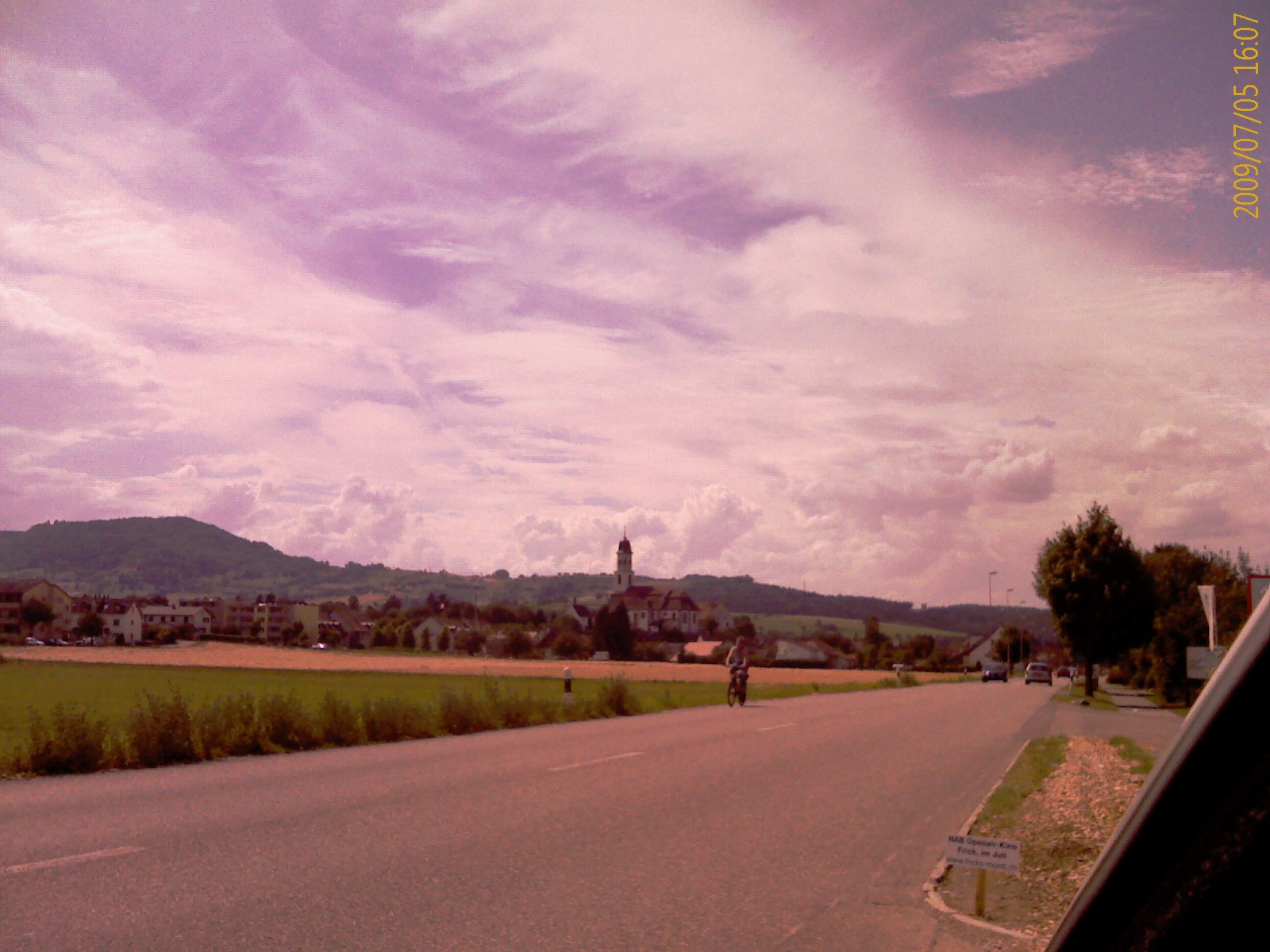

Frick has an area, as of 2009, of 9.96 km^{2} (3.85 sq mi). Of this area, 4.59 square kilometers (1.77 sq mi) or 46.1% is used for agricultural purposes, while 2.92 square kilometers (1.13 sq mi) or 29.3% is forested. Of the rest of the land, 2.41 square kilometers (0.93 sq mi) or 24.2% is settled (buildings or roads), 0.06 km^{2} (15 acres) or 0.6% is either rivers or lakes. Over the past two decades (1979/85-2004/09) the amount of land that is settled has increased by 60 ha (150 acres) and the agricultural land has decreased by 59 ha (150 acres).

Of the built up area, industrial buildings made up 4.3% of the total area while housing and buildings made up 9.5% and transportation infrastructure made up 5.6%. Power and water infrastructure as well as other special developed areas made up 2.8% of the area while parks, green belts and sports fields made up 1.9%. 27.9% of the total land area is heavily forested and 1.4% is covered with orchards or small clusters of trees. Of the agricultural land, 26.3% is used for growing crops and 17.1% is pastures, while 2.7% is used for orchards or vine crops. All the water in the municipality is in rivers and streams.

The municipality is located in the Laufenburg district, located at the meeting of the Bözberg, Staffelegg and Benken Jura passes. It is the central municipality in the Fricktal. It consists of the haufendorf village (an irregular, unplanned and quite closely packed village, built around a central square) of Frick.

== Paleontology ==
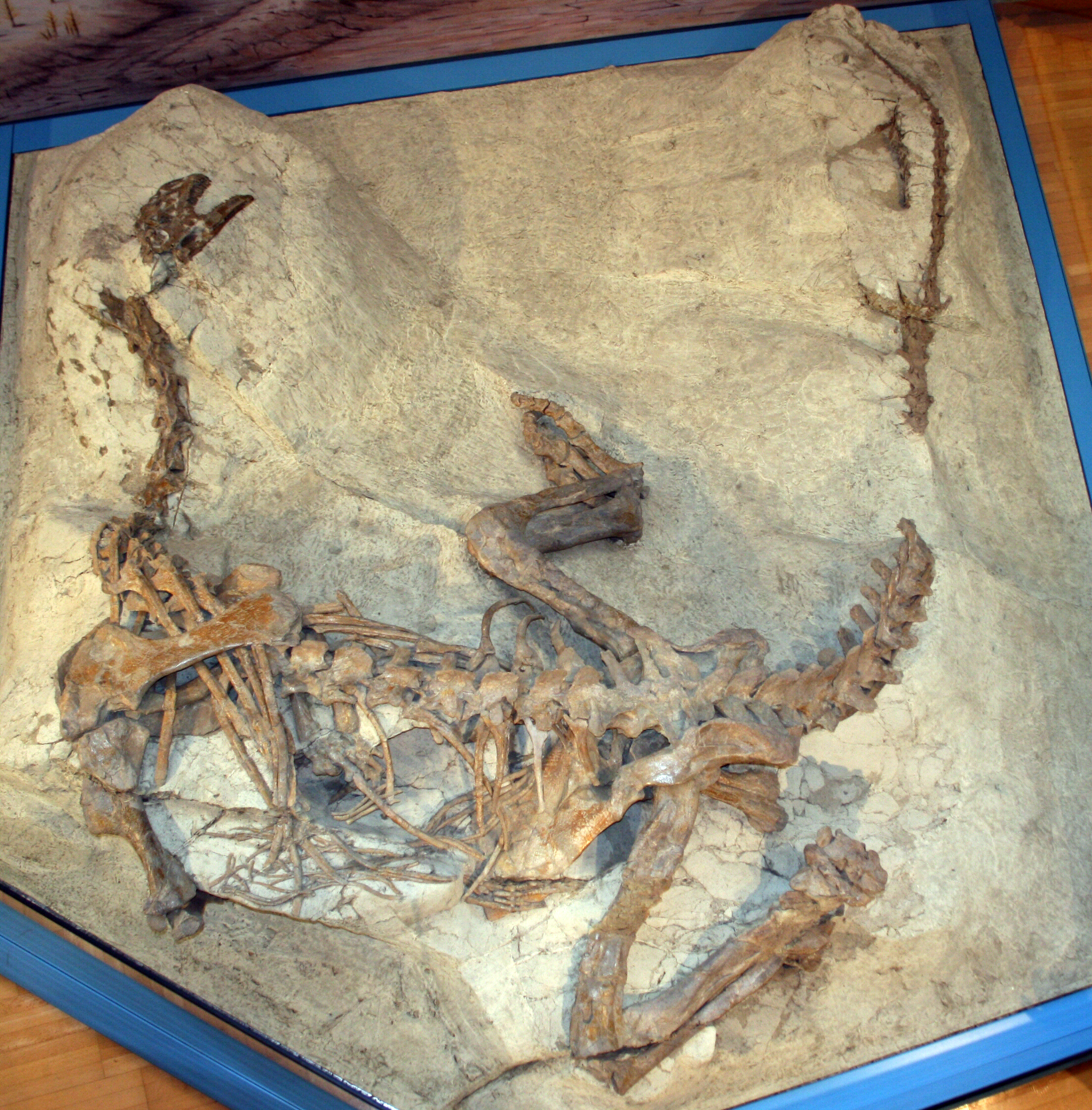
Plateosaurus fossil at the museum

During the upper Triassic period, about 210 million years ago, the region around Frick was a dry lowland with flat hills and small depressions. During the rainy season, the depressions filled with water and dinosaurs congregated around the ponds. When they died, their bodies were covered by the mud in the ponds and fossilized, creating rich fossil beds in Frick. The first Plateosaurus fossils were discovered in 1961 and further excavations during the following decades have discovered numerous fossils. In 2006, the only coelophysoidean (a small-sized flesh-eating dinosaur group) fossil in Switzerland, was found by an amateur paleontologist in Frick, in 2019 named Notatesseraeraptor.

== Demographics ==
Frick has a population (as of December 2020) of 5,629. As of 2014, 24.5% of the population are resident foreign nationals. Over the last 4 years (2010-2014) the population has changed at a rate of 7.03%. The birth rate in the municipality, in 2014, was 12.8, while the death rate was 7.4 per thousand residents. Most of the population (as of 2000) speaks German (85.1%), with Italian being second most common (3.6%) and Albanian being third (3.2%).

As of 2014, children and teenagers (0–19 years old) make up 20.7% of the population, while adults (20–64 years old) are 63.1% and seniors (over 64 years old) make up 16.1%. In 2015 there were 2,227 single residents, 2,434 people who were married or in a civil partnership, 250 widows or widowers and 373 divorced residents.

In 2014 there were 2,157 private households in Frick with an average household size of 2.38 persons. Of the 780 inhabited buildings in the municipality, in 2000, about 64.0% were single family homes and 17.9% were multiple family buildings. Additionally, about 12.4% of the buildings were built before 1919, while 19.7% were built between 1991 and 2000. In 2013 the rate of construction of new housing units per 1000 residents was 4.9. The vacancy rate for the municipality, in 2015, was 1.19%. As of 2000 about 41.9% of the total households were owner occupied, or in other words did not pay rent (though they may have a mortgage or a rent-to-own agreement).

As of 2000, there were 148 homes with 1 or 2 persons in the household, 836 homes with 3 or 4 persons in the household, and 554 homes with 5 or more persons in the household. As of 2000, there were 1,585 private households (homes and apartments) in the municipality, and an average of 2.5 persons per household. In 2008 there were 610 single family homes (or 29.9% of the total) out of a total of 2,041 homes and apartments. There were a total of 24 empty apartments for a 1.2% vacancy rate. As of 2007, the construction rate of new housing units was 12.9 new units per 1000 residents.

The historical population is given in the following chart:

== Heritage sites of national significance ==
The Catholic church of St. Peter and Paul as well as the charnel house are listed as a Swiss heritage site of national significance. The village of Frick is designated as part of the Inventory of Swiss Heritage Sites.

== Transportation ==
The municipality is located on the A3 motorway.

There is also a railway station served by the Swiss Federal Railways.

== Economy ==
As of 2007, Frick had an unemployment rate of 2.77%. As of 2014, there were a total of 3,540 people employed in the municipality. Of these, a total of 72 people worked in 14 businesses in the primary economic sector. A majority (61.1%) of the primary sector employees worked in very small businesses (less than ten employees). The remainder worked in 1 small business with 28 employees. The secondary sector employed 1,106 workers in 51 separate businesses. In 2014 a total of 313 employees worked in 45 small companies (less than 50 employees). There were 5 mid sized businesses with 450 employees and 1 large business which employed 343 people. Finally, the tertiary sector provided 2,362 jobs in 362 businesses. There were 25 small businesses with a total of 735 employees and 3 mid sized businesses with a total of 399 employees.

In 2014 a total of 4.9% of the population received social assistance.

In 2015 there was one movie theater in the municipality with 177 seats.

In 2000 there were 2,111 workers who lived in the municipality. Of these, 1,351 or about 64.0% of the residents worked outside Frick while 1,764 people commuted into the municipality for work. There were a total of 2,524 jobs (of at least 6 hours per week) in the municipality. Of the working population, 18% used public transportation to get to work, and 40.4% used a private car.

== Religion ==
From the 2000 census, 2,061 or 51.2% were Roman Catholic, while 931 or 23.1% belonged to the Swiss Reformed Church. Of the rest of the population, there were 21 individuals (or about 0.52% of the population) who belonged to the Christian Catholic faith.

== Politics ==
In the 2015 federal election the most popular party was the SVP with 37.6% of the vote. The next three most popular parties were the FDP (14.3%), the SP (12.9%) and the CVP (12.3%). In the federal election, a total of 1,506 votes were cast, and the voter turnout was 45.7%.

In the 2007 federal election the most popular party was the SVP which received 33.1% of the vote. The next three most popular parties were the CVP (19.9%), the SP (16%) and the FDP (12.9%).

== Education ==
In Frick about 66.6% of the population (between age 25–64) have completed either non-mandatory upper secondary education or additional higher education (either university or a Fachhochschule). Of the school age population (in the 2008/2009 school year), there are 318 students attending primary school, there are 246 students attending secondary school, there are 402 students attending tertiary or university level schooling in the municipality.

== Crime ==
In 2014 the crime rate, of the over 200 crimes listed in the Swiss Criminal Code (running from murder, robbery and assault to accepting bribes and election fraud), in Frick was 560 per thousand residents. This rate is over ten times greater than the cantonal rate and is seven and a half times greater than the average rate in the entire country. The rate has risen sharply in the last few years. In 2009 the rate was only 52.8, in 2010 it was 68, 2011 it was 72, it doubled in 2012 to 175, tripled in 2013 to 598 before dropping slightly in 2014. However, the majority of the crimes are probably financial crimes related to the 2013 scandal in which ASE Investment and Basel Cantonal Bank lost over 100 million CHF due to improper trading. Over 1,500 people were affected, leading to thousands of charges filed in Frick.

During the same period, the rate of drug crimes was 12.9 per thousand residents, which is a little higher than the national average but is more than double the cantonal rate (5.0 per thousand). The rate of violations of immigration, visa and work permit laws was 2.9 per thousand residents, which is about half the rate for the entire country.
