= Wölflinswil =

- Municipality
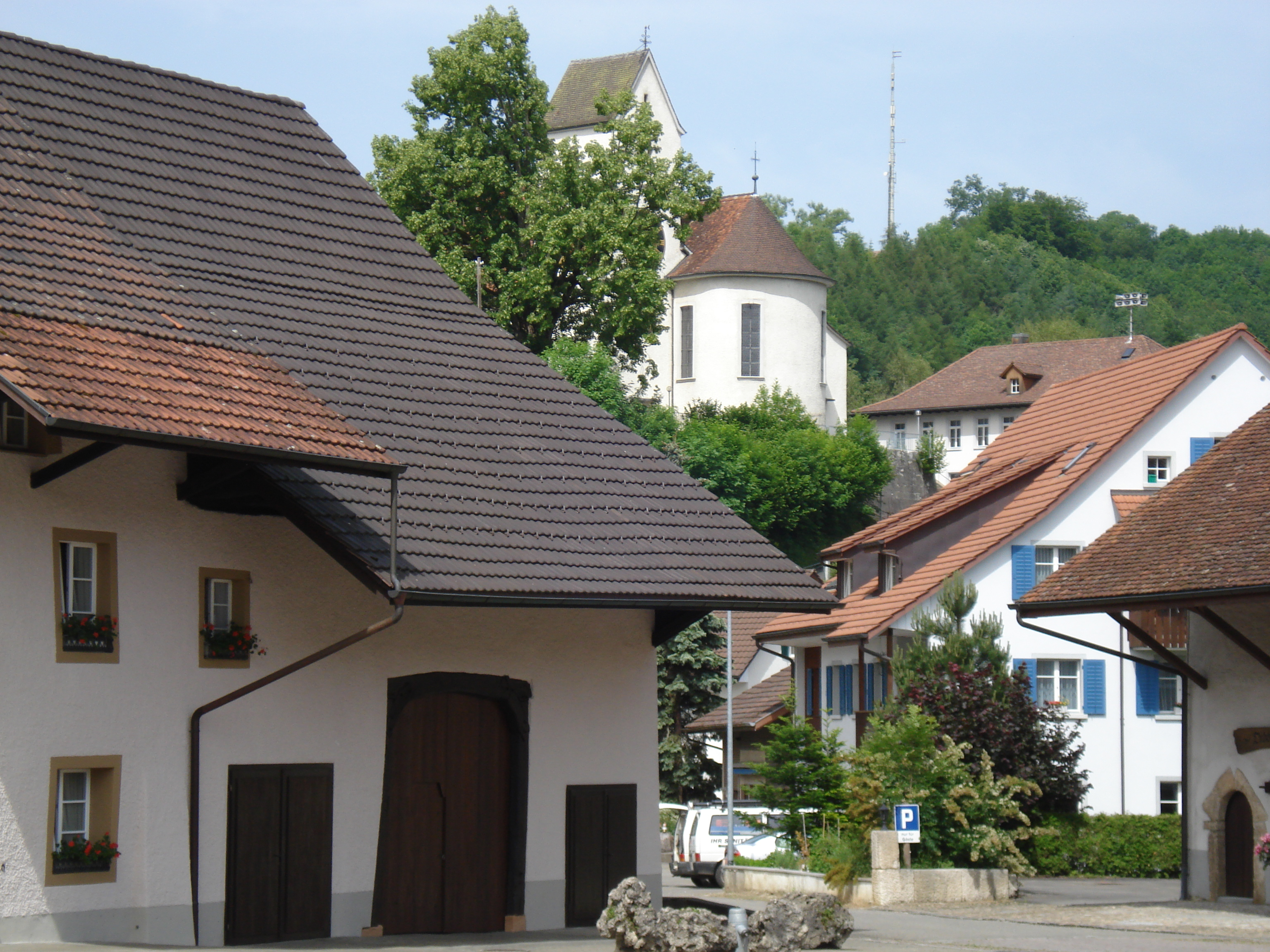

- Flag Coat of arms
- Location of Wölflinswil
- Location within Switzerland Location within Canton of Aargau
- Coordinates: 47°28′N 8°0′E
- Country: Switzerland
- Canton: Aargau
- District: Laufenburg

Area
  - Total: 9.51 km^{2} (3.67 sq mi)
- Elevation: 437 m (1,434 ft)

Population (December 2006)
  - Total: 851
  - Density: 89.5/km^{2} (232/sq mi)
- Time zone: UTC+01:00 (CET)
  - Summer (DST): UTC+02:00 (CEST)
- Postal code: 5063
- SFOS number: 4182
- ISO 3166 code: CH-AG
- Surrounded by: Densbüren, Gipf-Oberfrick, Herznach, Kienberg (SO), Oberhof, Wittnau
- Website: www.woelflinswil.ch

Wölflinswil is a municipality in the district of Laufenburg in the canton of Aargau in Switzerland.

== Geography ==
Aerial view (1950)

Wölflinswil has an area, as of 2009, of 9.51 square kilometers (3.67 sq mi). Of this area, 5.92 km^{2} (2.29 sq mi) or 62.3% is used for agricultural purposes, while 2.95 km^{2} (1.14 sq mi) or 31.0% is forested. Of the rest of the land, 0.61 km^{2} (0.24 sq mi) or 6.4% is settled (buildings or roads), 0.01 km^{2} (2.5 acres) or 0.1% is either rivers or lakes.

Of the built up area, housing and buildings made up 3.9% and transportation infrastructure made up 2.0%. Out of the forested land, 28.9% of the total land area is heavily forested and 2.1% is covered with orchards or small clusters of trees. Of the agricultural land, 39.4% is used for growing crops and 18.2% is pastures, while 4.6% is used for orchards or vine crops. All the water in the municipality is in rivers and streams.

== Coat of arms ==
"The blazon of the municipal coat of arms is Or a Wolf Gules passant regardant. The wolf is an example of canting."

== Demographics ==
Wölflinswil has a population (as of December 2020) of 1,033. As of June 2009, 5.0% of the population are foreign nationals. Over the last 10 years (1997–2007) the population has changed at a rate of 5.1%. Most of the population (as of 2000) speaks German (96.2%), with Albanian being second most common ( 1.8%) and Serbo-Croatian being third ( 0.6%).

The age distribution, as of 2008, in Wölflinswil is; 115 children or 12.7% of the population are between 0 and 9 years old and 110 teenagers or 12.1% are between 10 and 19. Of the adult population, 109 people or 12.0% of the population are between 20 and 29 years old. 123 people or 13.5% are between 30 and 39, 159 people or 17.5% are between 40 and 49, and 111 people or 12.2% are between 50 and 59. The senior population distribution is 108 people or 11.9% of the population are between 60 and 69 years old, 36 people or 4.0% are between 70 and 79, there are 33 people or 3.6% who are between 80 and 89, and there are 5 people or 0.6% who are 90 and older.

As of 2000, there were 17 homes with 1 or 2 persons in the household, 119 homes with 3 or 4 persons in the household, and 148 homes with 5 or more persons in the household. As of 2000, there were 294 private households (homes and apartments) in the municipality, and an average of 2.7 persons per household. In 2008 there were 176 single family homes (or 51.8% of the total) out of a total of 340 homes and apartments. There were a total of 3 empty apartments for a 0.9% vacancy rate. As of 2007, the construction rate of new housing units was 14.9 new units per 1000 residents.

In the 2007 federal election the most popular party was the SVP which received 44.9% of the vote. The next three most popular parties were the CVP (21%), the SP (10.2%) and the FDP (7.1%).

In Wölflinswil about 75.8% of the population (between age 25-64) have completed either non-mandatory upper secondary education or additional higher education (either university or a Fachhochschule). Of the school age population (in the 2008/2009 school year), there are 81 students attending primary school in the municipality.

The historical population is given in the following table:

Historical population
Year	Pop.	±%
1975	739	—
1980	753	+1.9%
1990	739	−1.9%
2000	810	+9.6%

== Sights ==
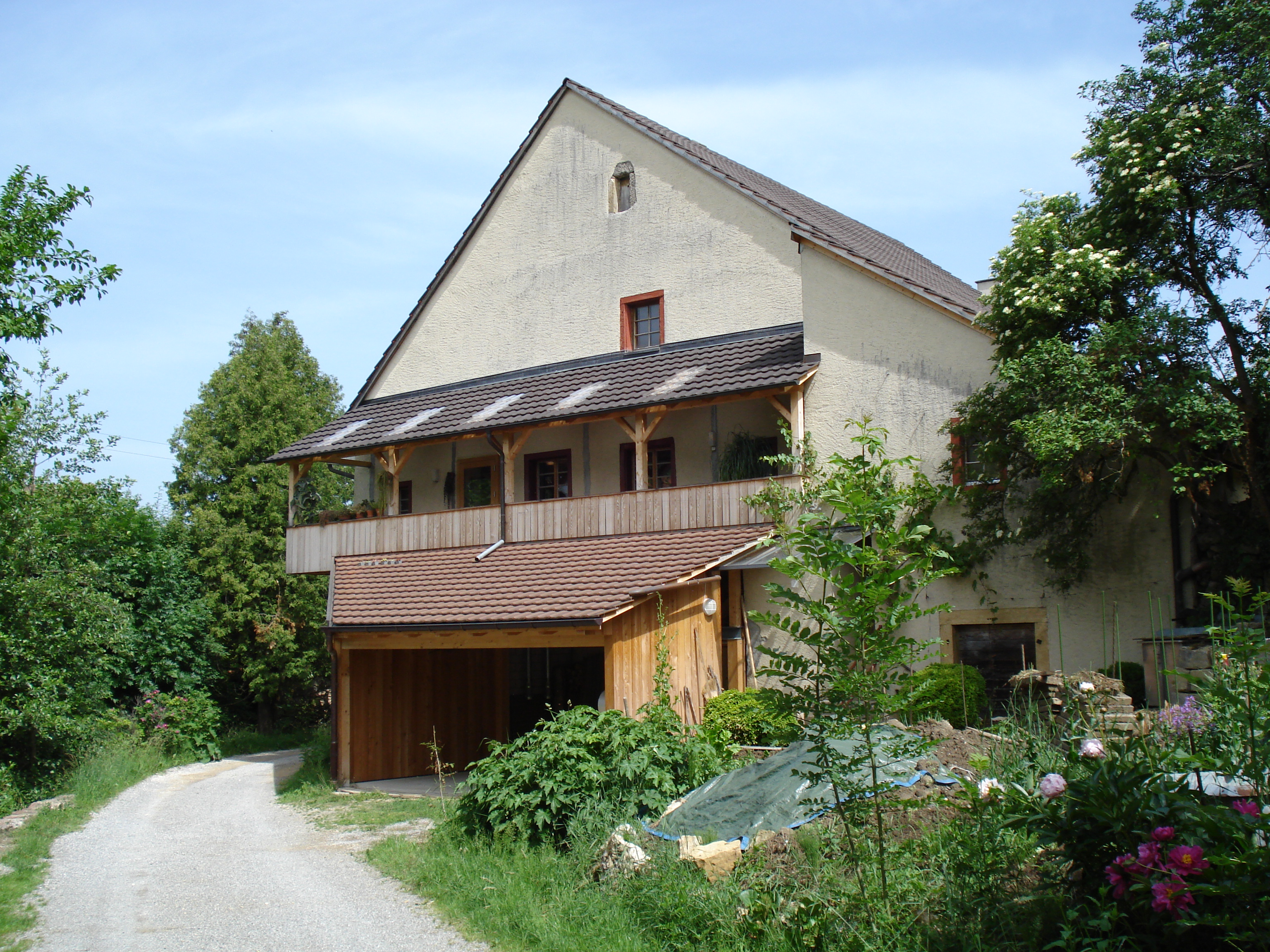
Former mill in Wölflinswil, it was built in 1674

The village of Wölflinswil is designated as part of the Inventory of Swiss Heritage Sites.

== Economy ==
As of 2007, Wölflinswil had an unemployment rate of 1.63%. As of 2005, there were 110 people employed in the primary economic sector and about 37 businesses involved in this sector. 57 people are employed in the secondary sector and there are 8 businesses in this sector. 104 people are employed in the tertiary sector, with 23 businesses in this sector.

In 2000 there were 429 workers who lived in the municipality. Of these, 291 or about 67.8% of the residents worked outside Wölflinswil while 71 people commuted into the municipality for work. There were a total of 209 jobs (of at least 6 hours per week) in the municipality. Of the working population, 14.2% used public transportation to get to work, and 45% used a private car.

Wölflinswil has a kindergarten and a primary school. Sekundarschule and Realschule can be attended in Gipf-Oberfrick and Bezirksschule in Frick. The nearest Kantonsschule is in Aarau.

== Religion ==
From the 2000 census, 529 or 67.5% were Roman Catholic, while 138 or 17.6% belonged to the Swiss Reformed Church. Wölflinswil has one Catholic Church. Of the rest of the population, there was 1 individual who belonged to the Christian Catholic faith.
