= Sins, Aargau =

Sins
- Municipality
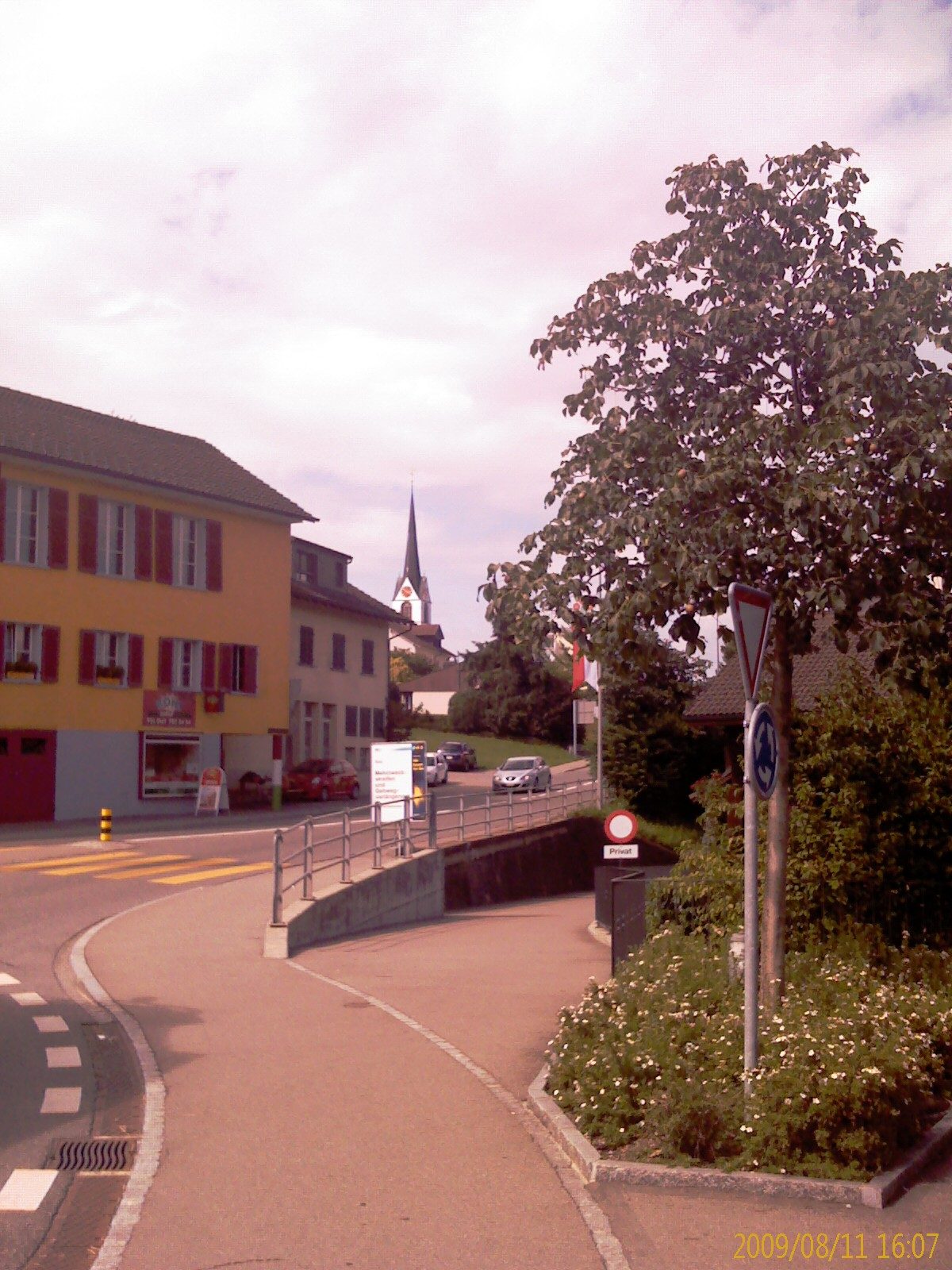

- Flag Coat of arms
- Location of Sins
- Location within Switzerland Location within Canton of Aargau
- Coordinates: 47°12′N 8°23′E
- Country: Switzerland
- Canton: Aargau
- District: Muri

Area
  - Total: 20.28 km^{2} (7.83 sq mi)
- Elevation: 410 m (1,350 ft)

Population (December 2006)
  - Total: 3,629
  - Density: 178.9/km^{2} (463.5/sq mi)
- Time zone: UTC+01:00 (CET)
  - Summer (DST): UTC+02:00 (CEST)
- Postal codes: 5643 Sins, 5643 Alikon; 5643 Meienberg; 5645 Aettenschwil
- SFOS number: 4239
- ISO 3166 code: CH-AG
- Surrounded by: Abtwil, Auw, Ballwil (LU), Dietwil, Hohenrain (LU), Hünenberg (ZG), Inwil (LU), Mühlau, Oberrüti
- Website: www.sins.ch

Sins is a municipality in the district of Muri in the canton of Aargau in Switzerland.

== Geography ==
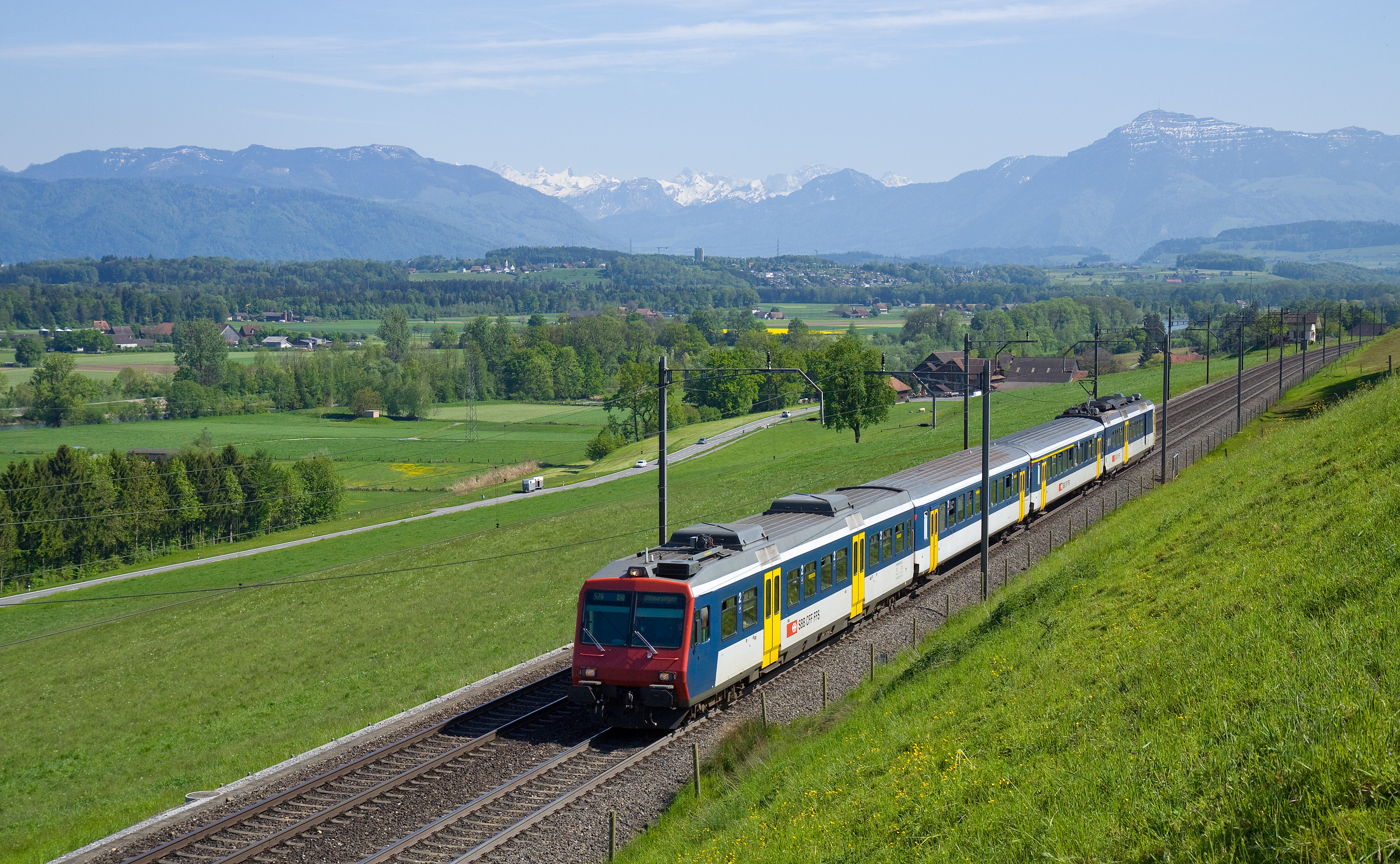
Local train between Sins and Mühlau

Sins has an area, as of 2009, of 20.3 square kilometers (7.8 sq mi). Of this area, 14.64 km^{2} (5.65 sq mi) or 72.1% is used for agricultural purposes, while 3.54 km^{2} (1.37 sq mi) or 17.4% is forested. Of the rest of the land, 1.95 km^{2} (0.75 sq mi) or 9.6% is settled (buildings or roads), 0.1 km^{2} (25 acres) or 0.5% is either rivers or lakes and 0.01 km^{2} (2.5 acres) or 0.0% is unproductive land.

Of the built up area, industrial buildings made up 1.3% of the total area while housing and buildings made up 4.9% and transportation infrastructure made up 2.8%. Out of the forested land, 16.3% of the total land area is heavily forested and 1.2% is covered with orchards or small clusters of trees. Of the agricultural land, 45.3% is used for growing crops and 24.8% is pastures, while 2.0% is used for orchards or vine crops. All the water in the municipality is in rivers and streams.

== Coat of arms ==
The blazon of the municipal coat of arms is Argent three Roses Gules barbed seeded slipped and leaved proper issuant from Coupeaux Vert.

== Demographics ==
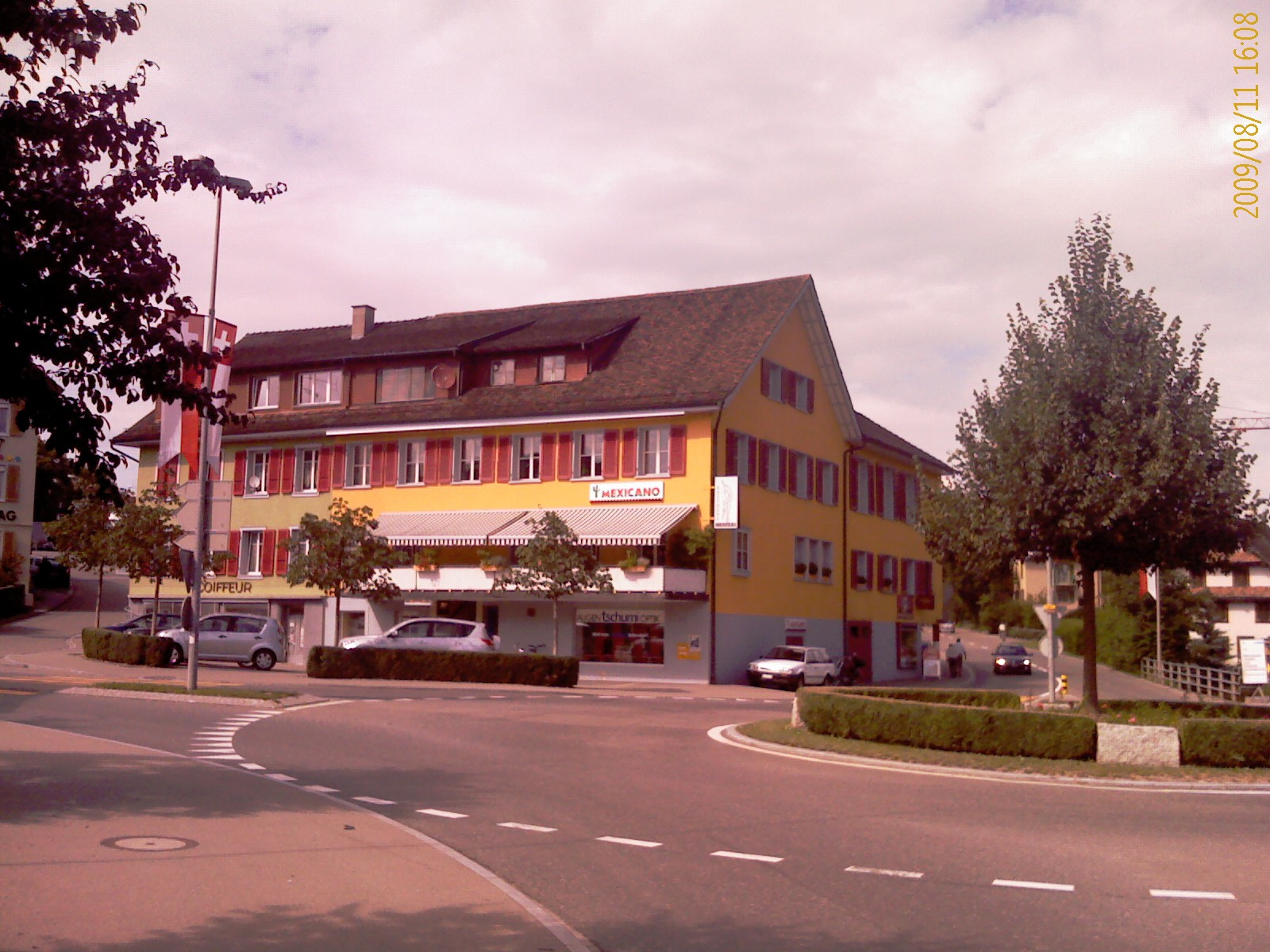
Mexican restaurant in Sins

Sins has a population (as of December 2020) of 4,299. As of June 2009, 14.9% of the population are foreign nationals. Over the last 10 years (1997–2007) the population has changed at a rate of 13.1%. Most of the population (as of 2000) speaks German (92.7%), with Serbo-Croatian being second most common ( 2.0%) and Albanian being third ( 1.3%).

The age distribution, as of 2008, in Sins is; 479 children or 12.8% of the population are between 0 and 9 years old and 536 teenagers or 14.3% are between 10 and 19. Of the adult population, 436 people or 11.7% of the population are between 20 and 29 years old. 533 people or 14.3% are between 30 and 39, 645 people or 17.2% are between 40 and 49, and 481 people or 12.9% are between 50 and 59. The senior population distribution is 313 people or 8.4% of the population are between 60 and 69 years old, 195 people or 5.2% are between 70 and 79, there are 106 people or 2.8% who are between 80 and 89, and there are 16 people or 0.4% who are 90 and older.

As of 2000, there were 97 homes with 1 or 2 persons in the household, 468 homes with 3 or 4 persons in the household, and 547 homes with 5 or more persons in the household. As of 2000, there were 1,144 private households (homes and apartments) in the municipality, and an average of 2.8 persons per household. In 2008 there were 573 single family homes (or 39.4% of the total) out of a total of 1,453 homes and apartments. There were a total of 20 empty apartments for a 1.4% vacancy rate. As of 2007, the construction rate of new housing units was 9.6 new units per 1000 residents.

In the 2007 federal election the most popular party was the SVP which received 33.9% of the vote. The next three most popular parties were the CVP (29.5%), the FDP (15.4%) and the SP (9.4%).

The historical population is given in the following table:

Historical population
| Year | Pop. | ±% |
|---|---|---|
| 1975 | 2,638 | — |
| 1980 | 2,730 | +3.5% |
| 1990 | 2,967 | +8.7% |
| 2000 | 3,294 | +11.0% |
| 2010 | 4,055 | +23.1% |

== Heritage sites of national significance ==
Aerial view (1945)

The former government house of Meienberg at Stadtplatz 2, the current municipal building (former rectory) at Kirchstrasse 14 and the ruins of Meienberg are all listed as Swiss heritage sites of national significance.

== Economy ==
As of 2007, Sins had an unemployment rate of 1.61%. As of 2005, there were 283 people employed in the primary economic sector and about 98 businesses involved in this sector. 589 people are employed in the secondary sector and there are 52 businesses in this sector. 662 people are employed in the tertiary sector, with 108 businesses in this sector.

In 2000 there were 1,712 workers who lived in the municipality. Of these, 1,065 or about 62.2% of the residents worked outside Sins while 616 people commuted into the municipality for work. There were a total of 1,263 jobs (of at least 6 hours per week) in the municipality. Of the working population, 10.1% used public transportation to get to work, and 50% used a private car.

== Religion ==
From the 2000 census, 2,350 or 71.6% were Roman Catholic, while 415 or 12.6% belonged to the Swiss Reformed Church. Of the rest of the population, there were 4 individuals (or about 0.12% of the population) who belonged to the Christian Catholic faith.

== Education ==
In Sins about 72.6% of the population (between age 25-64) have completed either non-mandatory upper secondary education or additional higher education (either university or a Fachhochschule). Of the school age population (in the 2008/2009 school year), there are 359 students attending primary school, there are 287 students attending secondary school, there are 220 students attending tertiary or university level schooling in the municipality.

Sins is home to the Gemeindebibliothek Sins (municipal library of Sins). The library has (as of 2008) 3,802 books or other media, and loaned out 10,042 items in the same year. It was open a total of 157 days with average of 7 hours per week during that year.
