= Abtwil =

Abtwil may refer to the following places

- Abtwil, Aargau, Switzerland
- Abtwil, a village in the municipality of Gaiserwald, St. Gallen, Switzerland
