= Oberrüti =

- Municipality
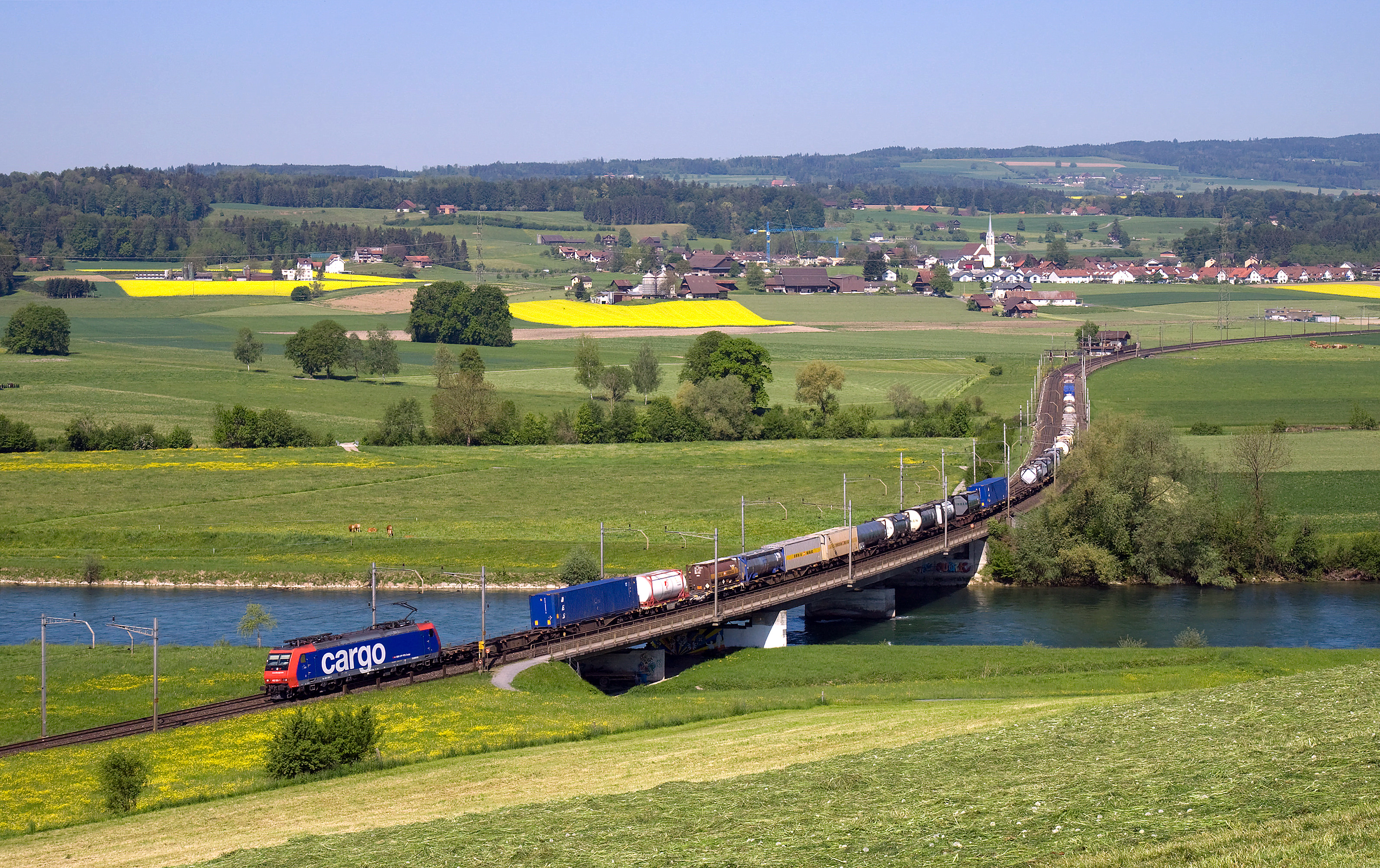

- Flag Coat of arms
- Location of Oberrüti
- Location within Switzerland Location within Canton of Aargau
- Coordinates: 47°10′N 8°24′E
- Country: Switzerland
- Canton: Aargau
- District: Muri

Area
  - Total: 5.37 km^{2} (2.07 sq mi)
- Elevation: 416 m (1,365 ft)

Population (December 2006)
  - Total: 1,217
  - Density: 227/km^{2} (587/sq mi)
- Time zone: UTC+01:00 (CET)
  - Summer (DST): UTC+02:00 (CEST)
- Postal code: 5647
- SFOS number: 4237
- ISO 3166 code: CH-AG
- Surrounded by: Dietwil, Hünenberg (ZG), Risch (ZG), Sins
- Website: www.oberrueti.ch

Oberrüti is a municipality in the district of Muri in the canton of Aargau in Switzerland.

== History ==
Aerial view (1957)

Oberrüti is first mentioned in 1236 as Ruty. In wasn't until the creation of the Canton of Aargau in 1803 that the name became Oberrüti.

Oberrüti was part of the Habsburgs high court district of Meienberg. After the conquest of the Aargau in 1415, it became part of Lucerne. From 1425 until 1798 it was part of the Freie Ämter, which were governed as "subject lands" by all or some of the Confederates. The Twingherrschaft belonged to the Lords of Hünenberg. The Lords of Hünenberg also founded the village church of St. Ruprecht, which is first mentioned in 1275. After 1415 they sold the whole property to Ulrich Hertenstein, a citizen of Lucerne. He, then, ceded the rights to Kappel Abbey in 1448. From 1498 to 1798 the village government and church Jus patronatus or patronage rights were held by the city of Zug. In 1803 the Canton of Aargau was formed and Oberrüti became part of it. The ferry over the Reuss river was originally a Habsburg fief. It was in operation from 1413 until 1884.

== Geography ==
Oberrüti has an area, as of 2009, of 5.37 square kilometers (2.07 sq mi). Of this area, 3.76 km^{2} (1.45 sq mi) or 70.0% is used for agricultural purposes, while 0.82 km^{2} (0.32 sq mi) or 15.3% is forested. Of the rest of the land, 0.53 km^{2} (0.20 sq mi) or 9.9% is settled (buildings or roads), 0.15 km^{2} (37 acres) or 2.8% is either rivers or lakes and 0.07 km^{2} (17 acres) or 1.3% is unproductive land.

Of the built up area, housing and buildings made up 5.0% and transportation infrastructure made up 3.7%. Out of the forested land, all of the forested land area is covered with heavy forests. Of the agricultural land, 45.6% is used for growing crops and 22.9% is pastures, while 1.5% is used for orchards or vine crops. All the water in the municipality is in rivers and streams. Of the unproductive areas, 1.3% is unproductive vegetation.

The municipality is located in the Muri district, in the southernmost portion of the canton. It is located along the Reuss. It consists of the village of Oberrüti and scattered small settlements and individual houses.

== Coat of arms ==
The blazon of the municipal coat of arms is Or an Antler embowed Sable.

== Demographics ==
Oberrüti has a population (as of December 2020) of 1,544. As of June 2009, 7.1% of the population are foreign nationals. Over the last 10 years (1997–2007) the population has changed at a rate of 21.4%. Most of the population (as of 2000) speaks German (97.2%), with Portuguese being second most common ( 0.6%) and English being third ( 0.5%).

The age distribution, as of 2008, in Oberrüti is; 144 children or 11.8% of the population are between 0 and 9 years old and 230 teenagers or 18.9% are between 10 and 19. Of the adult population, 133 people or 10.9% of the population are between 20 and 29 years old. 138 people or 11.3% are between 30 and 39, 255 people or 21.0% are between 40 and 49, and 175 people or 14.4% are between 50 and 59. The senior population distribution is 80 people or 6.6% of the population are between 60 and 69 years old, 50 people or 4.1% are between 70 and 79, there are 10 people or 0.8% who are between 80 and 89, and there are 2 people or 0.2% who are 90 and older.

As of 2000 the average number of residents per living room was 0.64 which is more people per room than the cantonal average of 0.57 per room. In this case, a room is defined as space of a housing unit of at least 4 m^{2} (43 sq ft) as normal bedrooms, dining rooms, living rooms, kitchens and habitable cellars and attics. About 68.3% of the total households were owner occupied, or in other words did not pay rent (though they may have a mortgage or a rent-to-own agreement).

As of 2000, there were 24 homes with 1 or 2 persons in the household, 134 homes with 3 or 4 persons in the household, and 199 homes with 5 or more persons in the household. As of 2000, there were 381 private households (homes and apartments) in the municipality, and an average of 2.9 persons per household. In 2008 there were 216 single family homes (or 46.6% of the total) out of a total of 464 homes and apartments. There were a total of 7 empty apartments for a 1.5% vacancy rate. As of 2007, the construction rate of new housing units was 3.3 new units per 1000 residents.

In the 2007 federal election the most popular party was the SVP which received 32.4% of the vote. The next three most popular parties were the CVP (27.3%), the FDP (13.6%) and the SP (11.9%).

The historical population is given in the following table:

Historical population
Year	Pop.	±%
1850	539	—
1900	409	−24.1%
1950	479	+17.1%
1980	506	+5.6%
1990	740	+46.2%
2000	1,097	+48.2%

== Economy ==
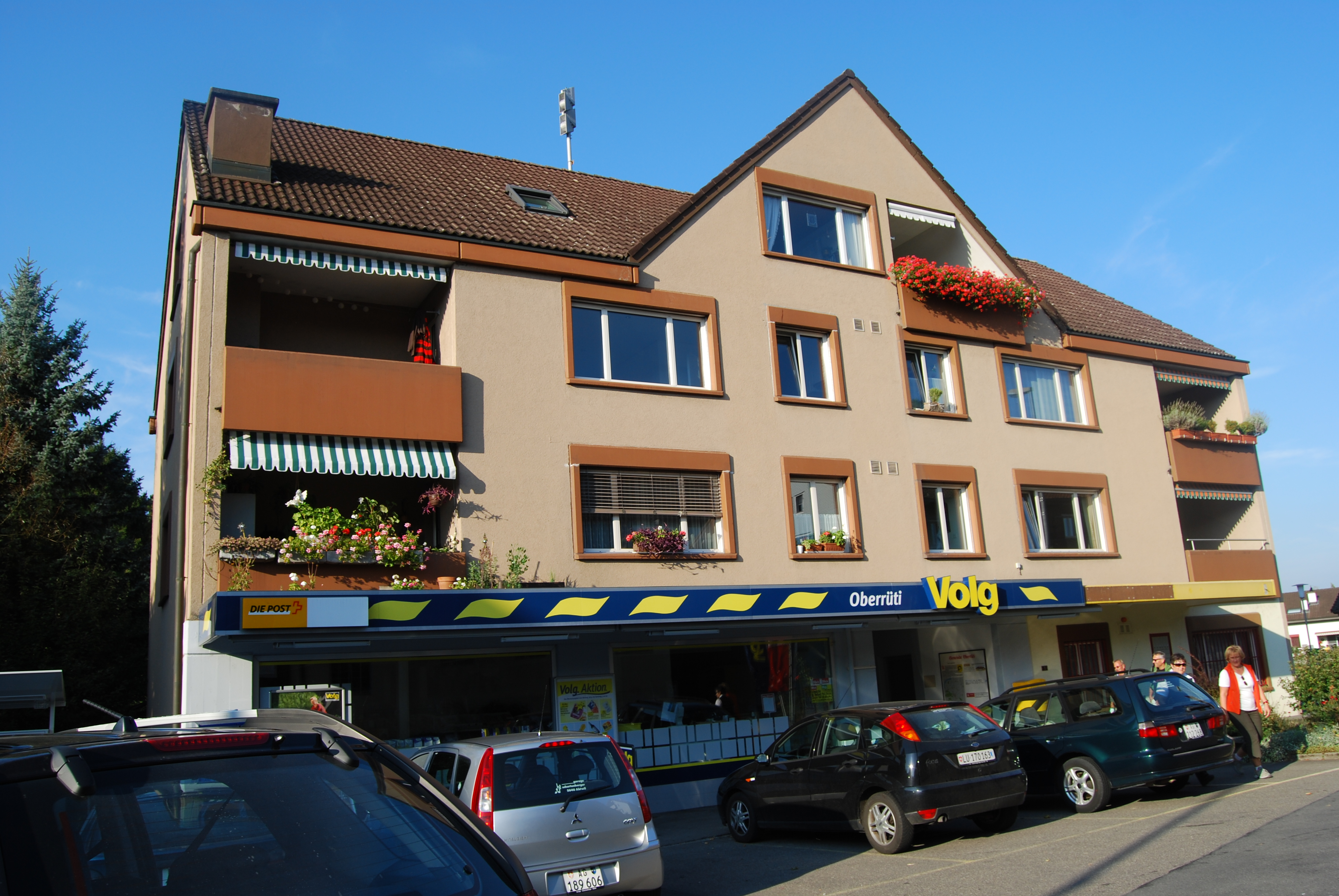
Volg Supermarket in Oberrüti

As of 2007, Oberrüti had an unemployment rate of 1.74%. As of 2005, there were 63 people employed in the primary economic sector and about 27 businesses involved in this sector. 83 people are employed in the secondary sector and there are 18 businesses in this sector. 95 people are employed in the tertiary sector, with 14 businesses in this sector.

In 2000 there were 577 workers who lived in the municipality. Of these, 444 or about 76.9% of the residents worked outside Oberrüti while 93 people commuted into the municipality for work. There were a total of 226 jobs (of at least 6 hours per week) in the municipality. Of the working population, 11.6% used public transportation to get to work, and 60.1% used a private car.

== Religion ==
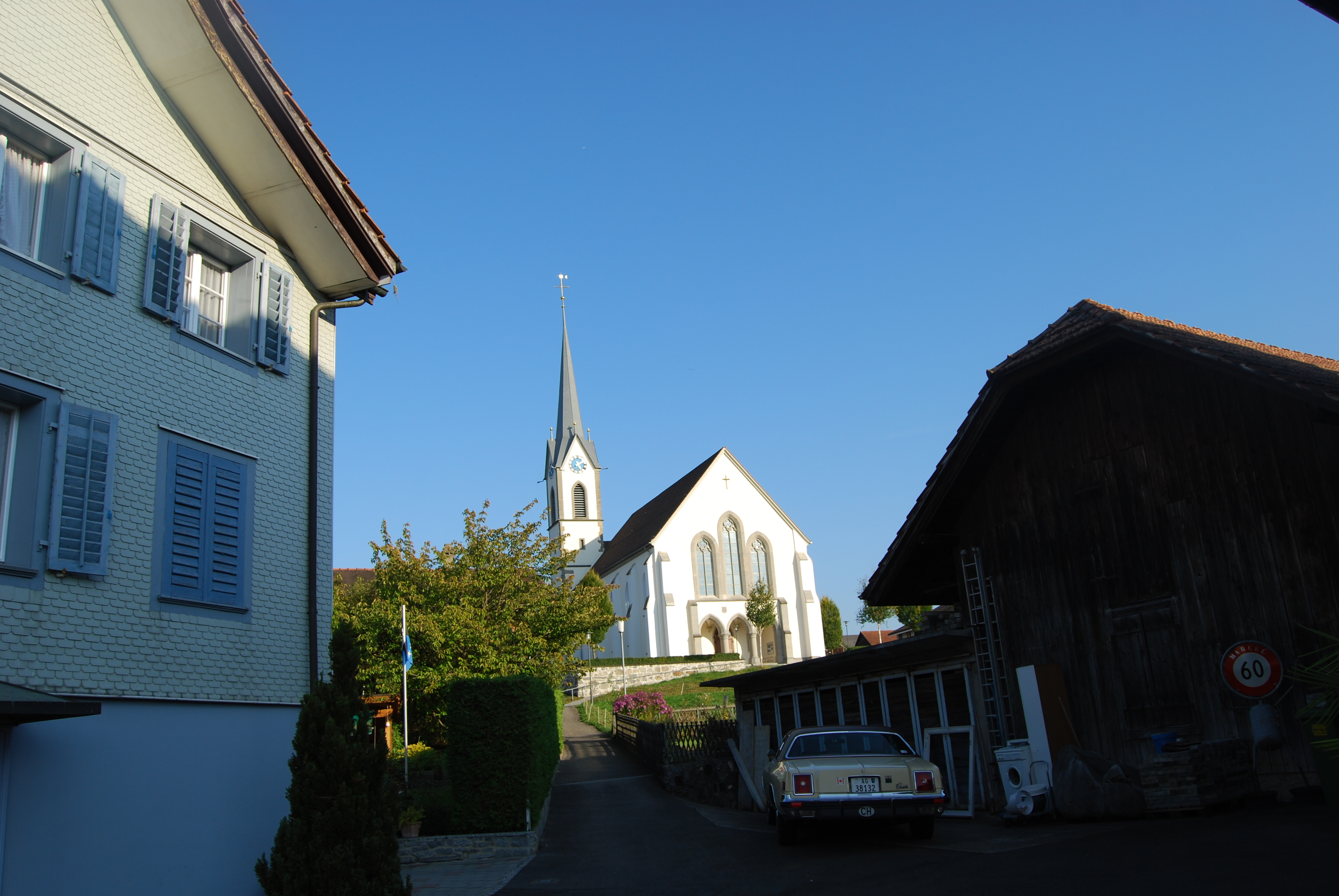
Church of Oberrüti

From the 2000 census, 803 or 73.2% were Roman Catholic, while 208 or 19.0% belonged to the Swiss Reformed Church.

== Education ==
In Oberrüti about 82.7% of the population (between age 25-64) have completed either non-mandatory upper secondary education or additional higher education (either university or a Fachhochschule). Of the school age population (in the 2008/2009 school year), there are 126 students attending primary school in the municipality.

Oberrüti is home to the Schul-u.Gde.Bibliothek Oberrüti (school and municipal library of Oberrüti). The library has (as of 2008) 1,190 books or other media, and loaned out 1,710 items in the same year. It was open a total of 81 days with average of 3 hours per week during that year.
