= Abtwil, Aargau =

Abtwil
- Municipality
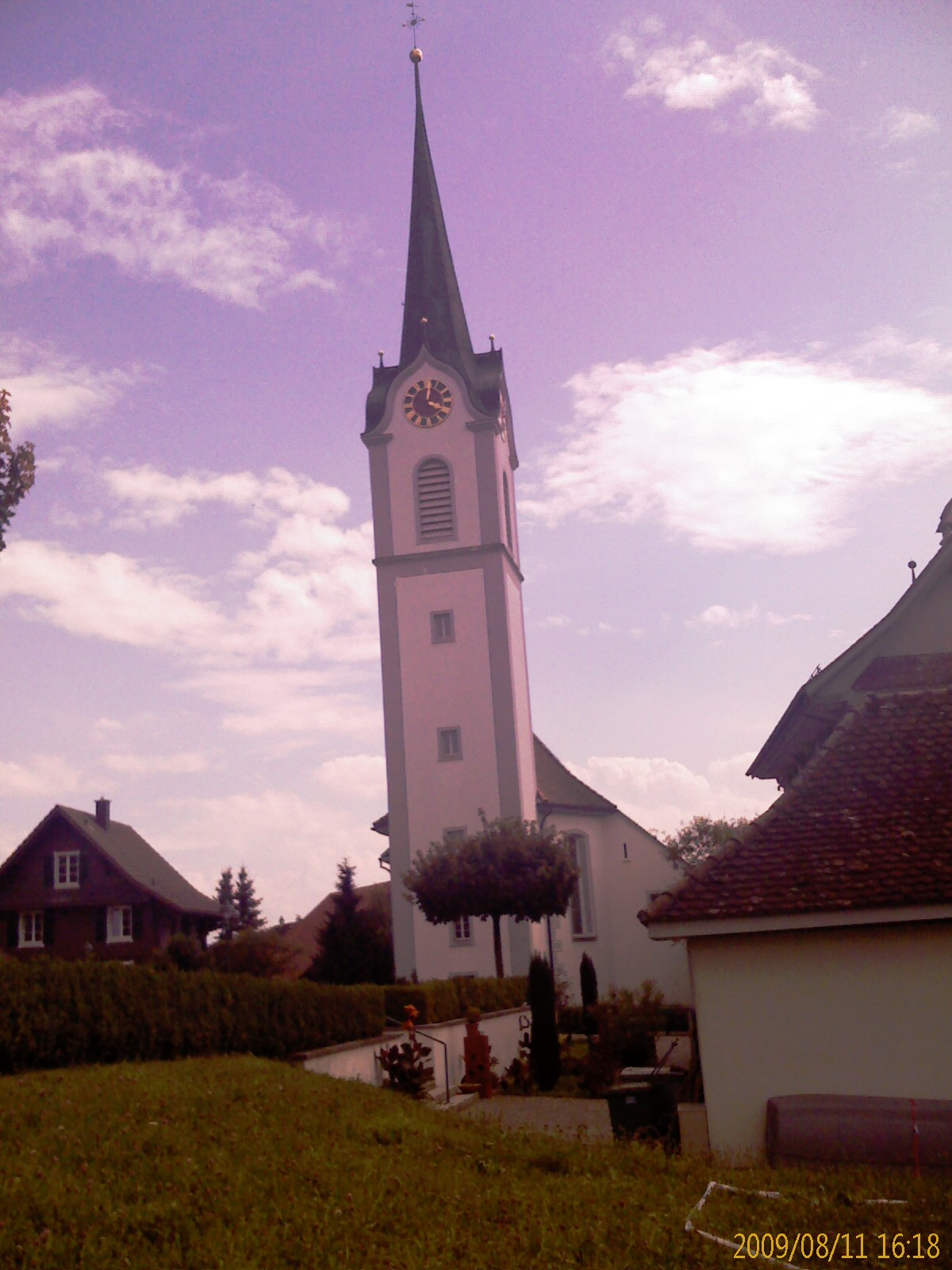

- Flag Coat of arms
- Location of Abtwil
- Location within Switzerland Location within Canton of Aargau
- Coordinates: 47°11′N 8°21′E
- Country: Switzerland
- Canton: Aargau
- District: Muri

Area
  - Total: 4.14 km^{2} (1.60 sq mi)
- Elevation: 536 m (1,759 ft)

Population (December 2020)
  - Total: 954
  - Density: 230/km^{2} (597/sq mi)
- Time zone: UTC+01:00 (CET)
  - Summer (DST): UTC+02:00 (CEST)
- Postal code: 5646
- SFOS number: 4221
- ISO 3166 code: CH-AG
- Surrounded by: Sins (AG), Hohenrain (LU), Ballwil (LU)
- Website: www.abtwilag.ch

Abtwil is a municipality in the district of Muri in the canton of Aargau in Switzerland. It lies next to the border with the canton of Lucerne.

== History ==
Aerial view (1964)

Roman and Alamanni archeological finds as well as two Alamanni cemeteries in Altchile indicate that the Abtwil area was occupied before the village of Abtwil is first mentioned in 1256 as Apwiler. During the Middle Ages the sovereign rights to the village were held by the Knights Hospitaller of Hohenrain. In 1256 Count Gottfried von Habsburg-Laufenburg unsuccessfully contested Knights' rights. The four farm houses remained in the possession of the Knights until 1805. Abtwil was, until 1798, part of the High Court of Meienberg. Before 1415 the court was under the Habsburgs authority, then from 1415-24 it was under Lucerne's control and after 1424 it was under the authority of the Swiss Confederacy.

== Geography ==
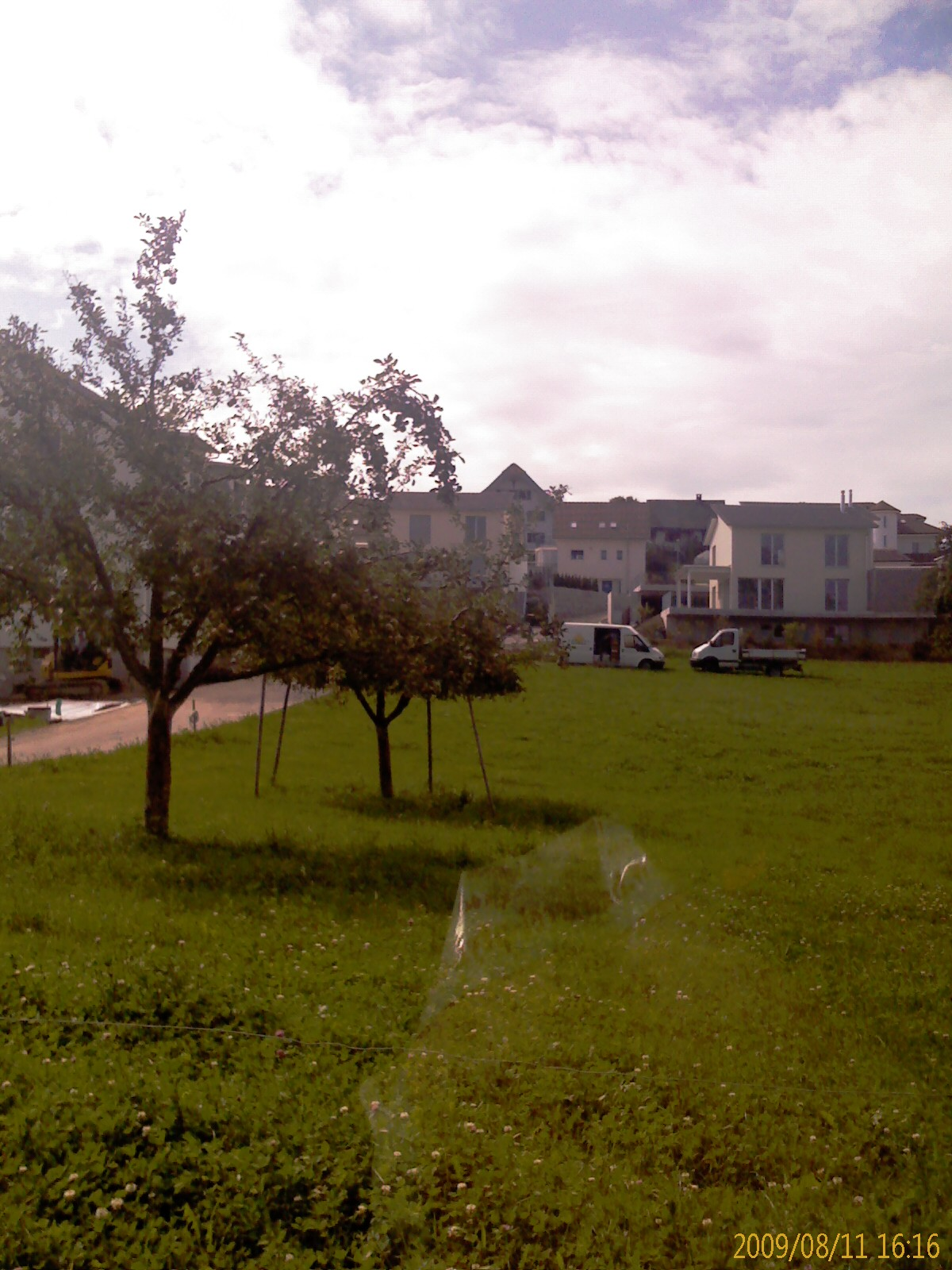
Abtwil

Abtwil has an area, as of 2009, of 4.14 square kilometers (1.60 sq mi). Of this area, 2.89 km^{2} (1.12 sq mi) or 69.8% is used for agricultural purposes, while 0.92 km^{2} (0.36 sq mi) or 22.2% is forested. Of the rest of the land, 0.34 km^{2} (0.13 sq mi) or 8.2% is settled (buildings or roads).

Of the built up area, housing and buildings made up 5.1% and transportation infrastructure made up 2.9%. Out of the forested land, 20.5% of the total land area is heavily forested and 1.7% is covered with orchards or small clusters of trees. Of the agricultural land, 42.5% is used for growing crops and 25.8% is pastures, while 1.4% is used for orchards or vine crops.

The municipality is located in the Muri district on the south foot of the Lindenberg. It consists of the haufendorf village (an irregular, unplanned and quite closely packed village, built around a central square) of Abtwil and the hamlet of Altchile.

== Coat of arms ==
The blazon of the municipal coat of arms is Azure a Crosier Or issuant from Base with a Ribbon Argent. This is an example of canting, since the coat of arms show an abbot's (German: Abt) crosier."

== Demographics ==
Abtwil has a population (as of December 2020) of 954. As of June 2009, 7.1% of the population are foreign nationals. Over the last 10 years (1997–2007) the population has changed at a rate of 12.5%. Most of the population (as of 2000) speaks German (97.0%), with Italian being second most common ( 0.6%) and Albanian being third ( 0.4%).

The age distribution, as of 2008, in Abtwil is; 92 children or 12.3% of the population are between 0 and 9 years old and 131 teenagers or 17.4% are between 10 and 19. Of the adult population, 83 people or 11.1% of the population are between 20 and 29 years old. 110 people or 14.6% are between 30 and 39, 167 people or 22.2% are between 40 and 49, and 94 people or 12.5% are between 50 and 59. The senior population distribution is 37 people or 4.9% of the population are between 60 and 69 years old, 22 people or 2.9% are between 70 and 79, there are 13 people or 1.7% who are between 80 and 89, and there are 2 people or 0.3% who are 90 and older.

As of 2000 the average number of residents per living room was 0.59 which is about equal to the cantonal average of 0.57 per room. In this case, a room is defined as space of a housing unit of at least 4 m^{2} (43 sq ft) as normal bedrooms, dining rooms, living rooms, kitchens and habitable cellars and attics. About 61% of the total households were owner occupied, or in other words did not pay rent (though they may have a mortgage or a rent-to-own agreement). As of 2000, there were 15 homes with 1 or 2 persons in the household, 98 homes with 3 or 4 persons in the household, and 115 homes with 5 or more persons in the household.

As of 2000, there were 240 private households (homes and apartments) in the municipality, and an average of 2.8 persons per household. In 2008 there were 114 single family homes (or 41.8% of the total) out of a total of 273 homes and apartments. There were a total of 13 empty apartments for a 4.8% vacancy rate. As of 2007, the construction rate of new housing units was 0 new units per 1000 residents.

In the 2007 federal election the most popular party was the SVP which received 43.1% of the vote. The next three most popular parties were the CVP (26.8%), the FDP (10%) and the SP (6.4%).

The historical population is given in the following table:

Historical population
Year	Pop.	±%
1836	392	—
1900	325	−17.1%
1950	342	+5.2%
1970	297	−13.2%
2000	674	+126.9%

== Economy ==
As of 2007, Abtwil had an unemployment rate of 0.78%. As of 2005, there were 45 people employed in the primary economic sector and about 18 businesses involved in this sector. 73 people are employed in the secondary sector and there are 8 businesses in this sector. 56 people are employed in the tertiary sector, with 14 businesses in this sector.

In 2000 there were 363 workers who lived in the municipality. Of these, 282 or about 77.7% of the residents worked outside Abtwil while 51 people commuted into the municipality for work. There were a total of 132 jobs (of at least 6 hours per week) in the municipality. Of the working population, 6.2% used public transportation to get to work, and 60.5% used a private car.

== Religion ==
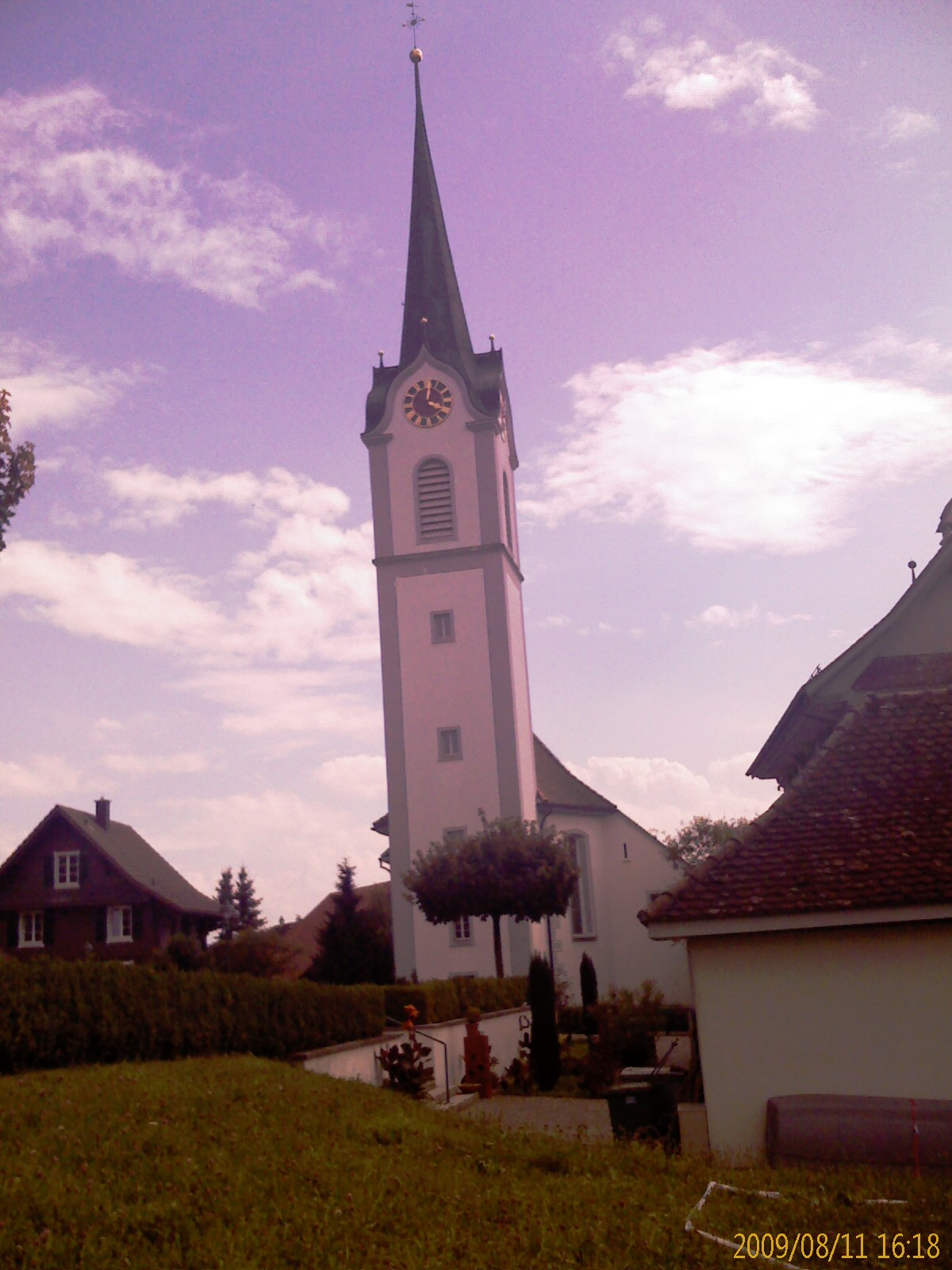
Church in Abtwil

From the 2000 census, 491 or 72.8% were Roman Catholic, while 79 or 11.7% belonged to the Swiss Reformed Church. Of the rest of the population, there was 1 individual who belonged to the Christian Catholic faith.

== Education ==
In Abtwil about 85.3% of the population (between age 25-64) have completed either non-mandatory upper secondary education or additional higher education (either university or a Fachhochschule). Of the school age population (in the 2008/2009 school year), there are 69 students attending primary school in the municipality.
