= Hünenberg =

- Municipality
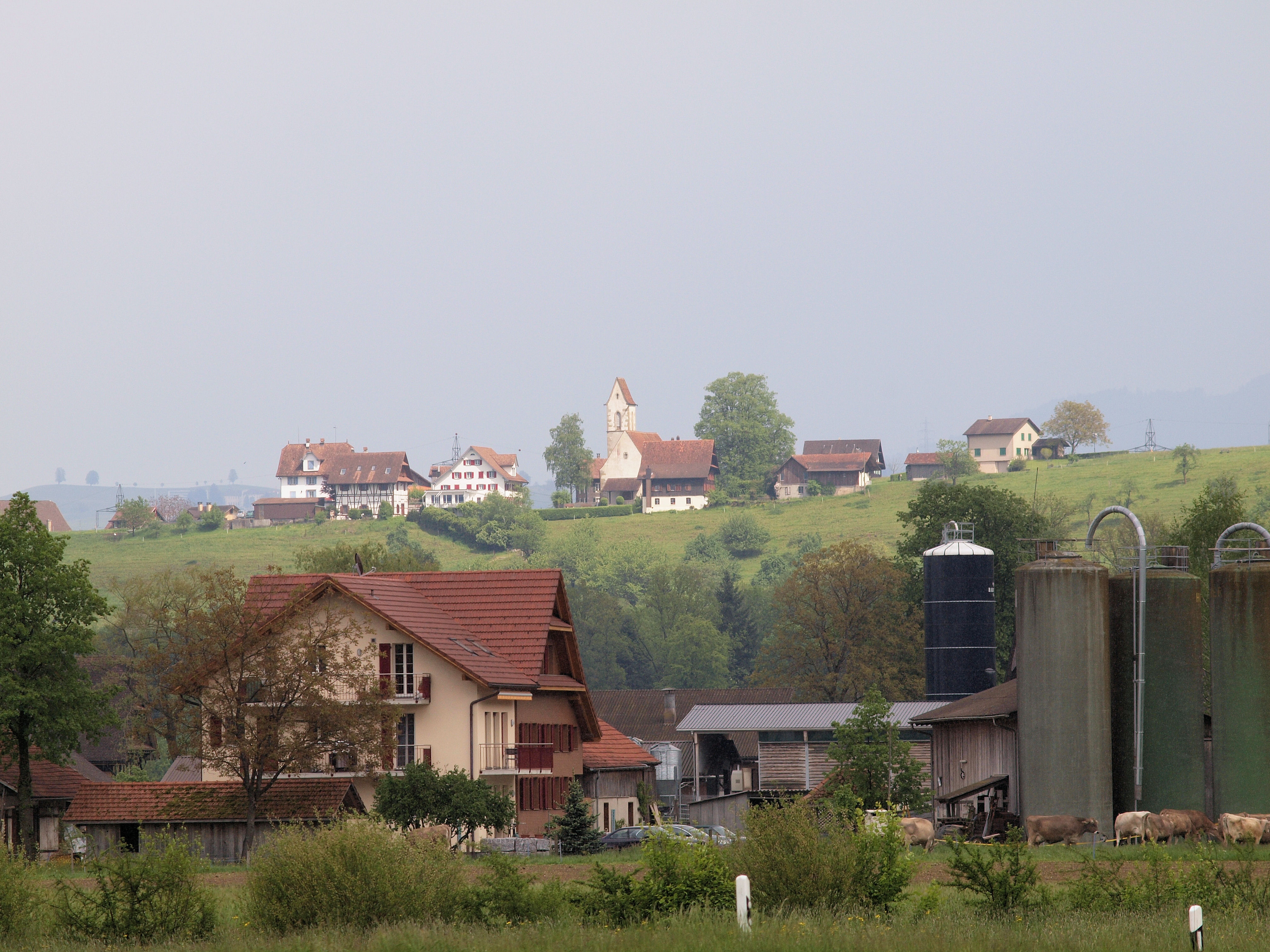

- Coat of arms
- Location of Hünenberg
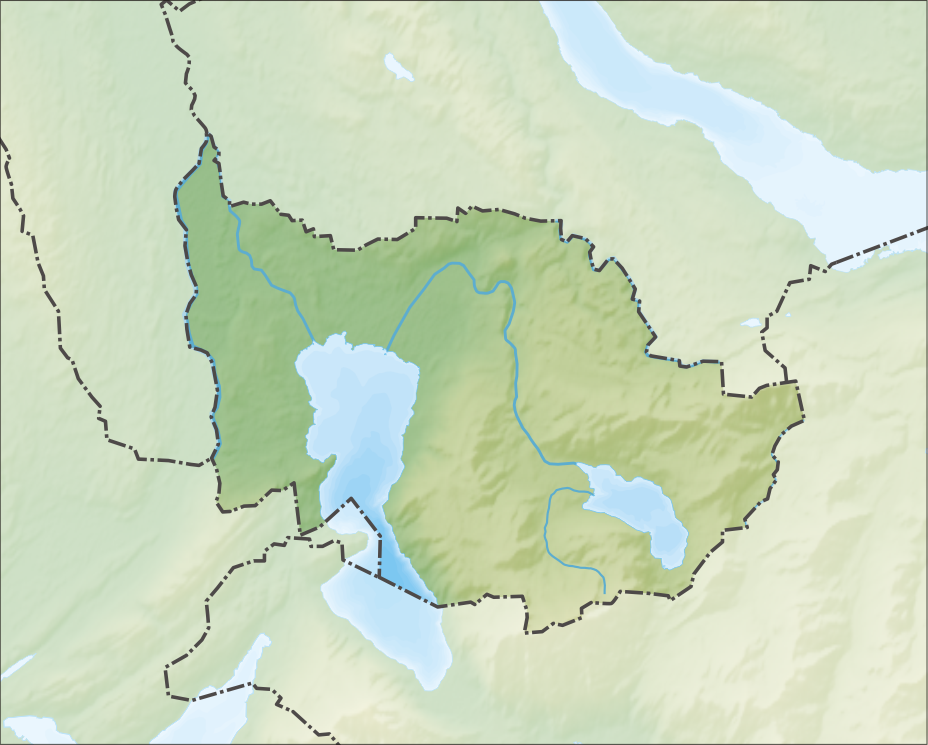
- Location within Switzerland Location within Canton of Zug
- Coordinates: 47°11′N 8°26′E
- Country: Switzerland
- Canton: Zug
- District: n.a.

Area
  - Total: 18.70 km^{2} (7.22 sq mi)
- Elevation: 444 m (1,457 ft)
- Lowest elevation (Reussspitz): 388 m (1,273 ft)

Population (December 2020)
  - Total: 8,768
  - Density: 468.9/km^{2} (1,214/sq mi)
- Time zone: UTC+01:00 (CET)
  - Summer (DST): UTC+02:00 (CEST)
- Postal code: 6331
- SFOS number: 1703
- ISO 3166 code: CH-ZG
- Surrounded by: Cham, Dietwil (AG), Maschwanden (ZH), Merenschwand (AG), Mühlau (AG), Oberrüti (AG), Obfelden (ZH), Risch, Sins (AG), Zug
- Twin towns: Banská Štiavnica (Slovakia)
- Website: www.huenenberg.ch

Hünenberg is a municipality in the canton of Zug in Switzerland.

== History ==
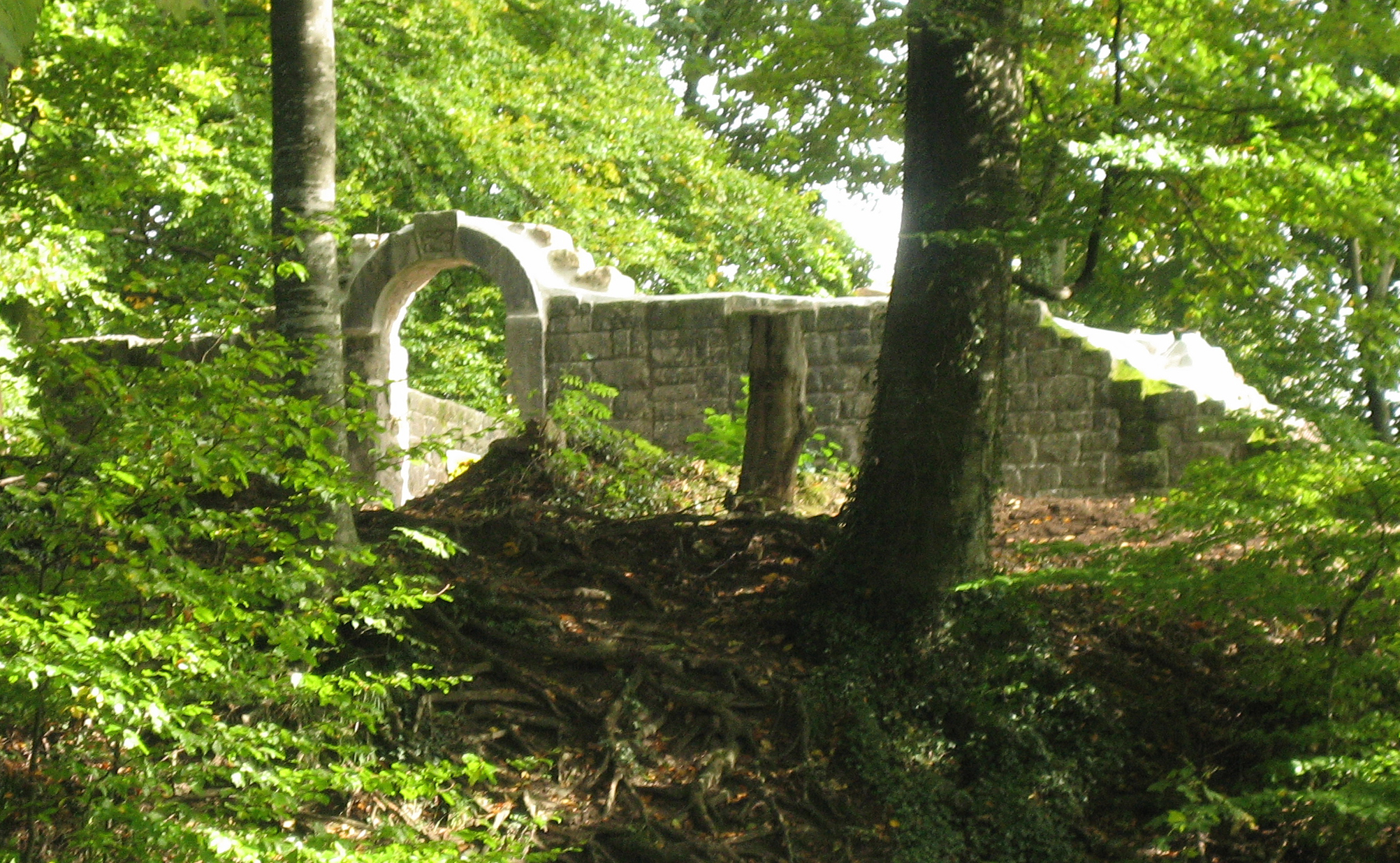
Ruins of Hünenberg Castle

Hünenberg is first mentioned in 1173 as de Hunberg, though this document is considered a forgery. In 1185, it was mentioned as de Hunoberg and in 1239 as de Hunaberc.

== Geography ==
Hünenberg has an area, as of 2006, of 18.4 km^{2} (7.1 sq mi). Of this area, 63.4% is used for agricultural purposes, while 17% is forested. Of the rest of the land, 12.3% is settled (buildings or roads) and the remainder (7.3%) is non-productive (rivers, glaciers or mountains).

The municipality is located between the Reuss river, Lorze river Lake Zug.

== Demographics ==
Hünenberg has a population (as of 31 December 2020) of 8,768. As of 2007, 12.1% of the population was made up of foreign nationals. Over the last 10 years the population has grown at a rate of 21.1%. Most of the population (as of 2000) speaks German (91.7%), with English being second most common ( 1.8%) and French being third ( 1.3%).

In the 2007 federal election the most popular party was the SVP which received 27.5% of the vote. The next three most popular parties were the CVP (26.7%), the FDP (21.9%) and the Green Party (15.3%).

In Hünenberg about 85.9% of the population (between ages 25-64) have completed either non-mandatory upper secondary education or additional higher education (either university or a Fachhochschule).

Hünenberg has an unemployment rate of 1.39%. As of 2005, there were 253 people employed in the primary economic sector and about 74 businesses involved in this sector. 1,092 people are employed in the secondary sector and there are 95 businesses in this sector. 2,881 people are employed in the tertiary sector, with 445 businesses in this sector.

The historical population is given in the following table:

Year	Population
1771	812
1850	1,032
1900	943
1950	1,409
1970	1,819
1980	4,105
2000	6,987

== Education ==
The International School of Zug and Luzern has its Riverside campus, housing upper secondary (senior high school) classes, in Hünenberg.

== Heritage sites of national significance ==
The Catholic Church of St. Wolfgang is listed as a heritage sites of national significance.
