= Auw, Aargau =

Auw
- Municipality
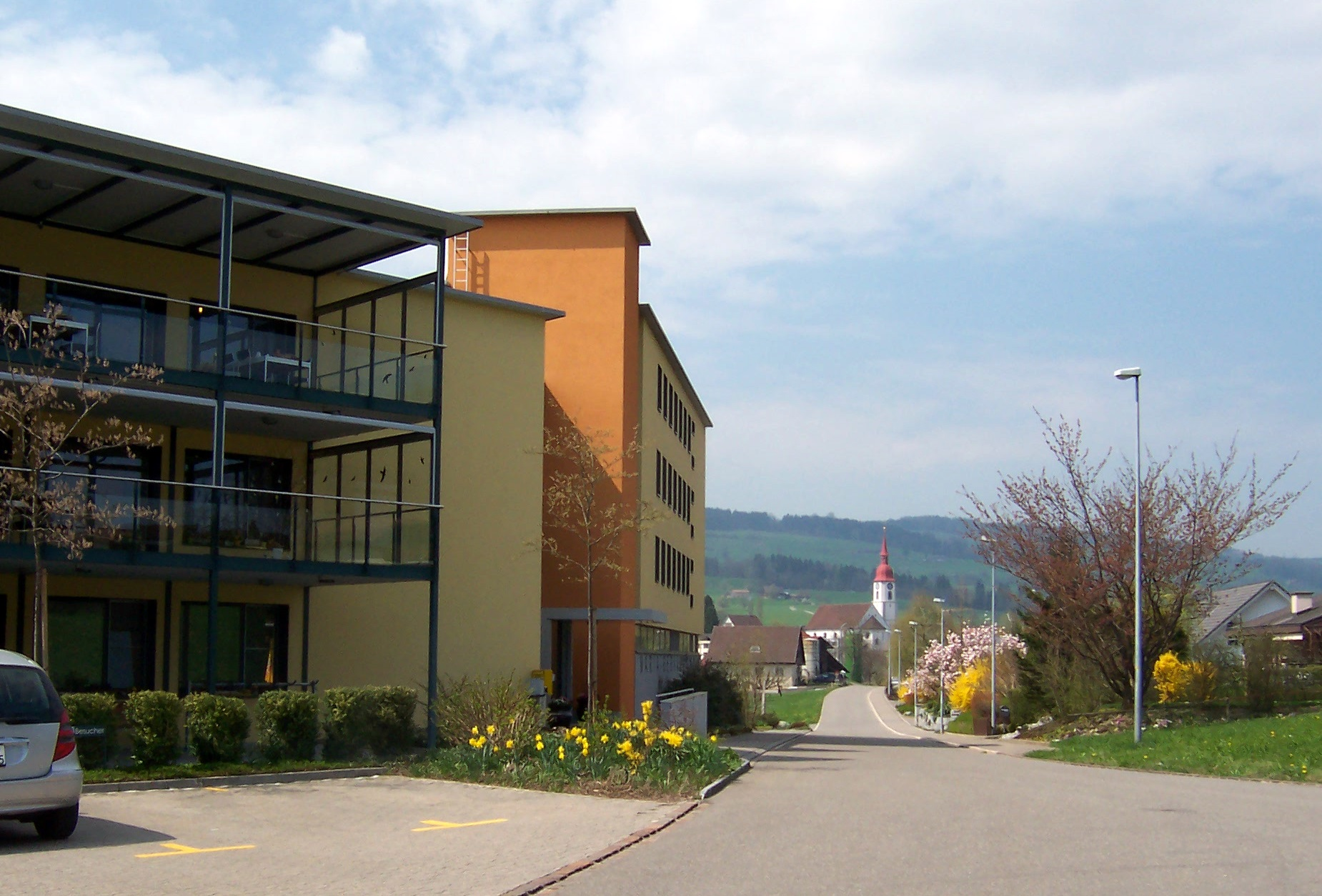

- Flag Coat of arms
- Location of Auw
- Location within Switzerland Location within Canton of Aargau
- Coordinates: 47°13′N 8°22′E
- Country: Switzerland
- Canton: Aargau
- District: Muri

Area
  - Total: 8.57 km^{2} (3.31 sq mi)
- Elevation: 489 m (1,604 ft)

Population (December 2020)
  - Total: 2,203
  - Density: 257/km^{2} (666/sq mi)
- Time zone: UTC+01:00 (CET)
  - Summer (DST): UTC+02:00 (CEST)
- Postal code: 5644
- SFOS number: 4223
- ISO 3166 code: CH-AG
- Surrounded by: Beinwil (Freiamt), Hohenrain (LU), Mühlau, Sins
- Website: www.auw.ch

Auw is a municipality in the district of Muri in the canton of Aargau in Switzerland.

== History ==
Aerial view (1970)

The first evidence of a human settlement near Auw are some Roman era cremation urn burials. The modern municipality of Auw is first mentioned in 924 as Houva. In 1306 it was mentioned as Owe. The major landholders in Auw were Muri and Engelberg Abbeys as well as the knightly family of Rüssegg. The rights to low justice was held by the Habsburgs and the Knight of Rüssegg, the high court right was held until 1415 by the Habsburgs. Between 1415 and 1425 the high court right belonged to Lucerne. Then the court rights moved to district of Meienberg. In 1715 a major fire destroyed 43 buildings. The first schoolhouse was built in 1809 and replaced with a new building in 1954.

Initially the church in Auw was a filial church to the parish church in Sins. The local parish was created in 1638 by agreement with Engelberg parish and was under that parish. This arraignment was maintained until 1849 by Engelberger Conventual. In 1705 the St. Nicholas Church replaced the chapel, which had existed since 1331.

Agriculture remains important in Auw. In 1990, 27% of the workers, worked in agriculture and in 1991 there were 42 dairy farms in the municipality.

== Geography ==
Auw has an area, as of 2009, of 8.57 square kilometers (3.31 sq mi). Of this area, 5.65 km^{2} (2.18 sq mi) or 65.9% is used for agricultural purposes, while 2.07 km^{2} (0.80 sq mi) or 24.2% is forested. Of the rest of the land, 0.81 km^{2} (0.31 sq mi) or 9.5% is settled (buildings or roads), 0.02 km^{2} (4.9 acres) or 0.2% is either rivers or lakes.

Of the built up area, housing and buildings made up 5.1% and transportation infrastructure made up 2.7%. Out of the forested land, all of the forested land area is covered with heavy forests. Of the agricultural land, 47.6% is used for growing crops and 17.9% is pastures. All the water in the municipality is in rivers and streams.

The municipality is located in the Muri district at the foot of the Lindenberg in the upper Freiamt. It consists of the villages of Auw and Rüstenschwil.

== Coat of arms ==
The blazon of the municipal coat of arms is Argent a Linden-tree eradicated Vert.

== Demographics ==
Auw has a population (as of December 2020) of 2,203 As of June 2009, 11.9% of the population are foreign nationals. Over the last 10 years (1997–2007) the population has changed at a rate of 35.9%. Most of the population (as of 2000) speaks German (94.0%), with Albanian being second most common ( 2.3%) and French being third ( 0.9%).

The age distribution, as of 2008, in Auw is; 249 children or 15.7% of the population are between 0 and 9 years old and 183 teenagers or 11.5% are between 10 and 19. Of the adult population, 176 people or 11.1% of the population are between 20 and 29 years old. 269 people or 16.9% are between 30 and 39, 295 people or 18.6% are between 40 and 49, and 189 people or 11.9% are between 50 and 59. The senior population distribution is 127 people or 8.0% of the population are between 60 and 69 years old, 73 people or 4.6% are between 70 and 79, there are 22 people or 1.4% who are between 80 and 89, and there are 6 people or 0.4% who are 90 and older.

As of 2000 the average number of residents per living room was 0.59 which is about equal to the cantonal average of 0.57 per room. In this case, a room is defined as space of a housing unit of at least 4 m^{2} (43 sq ft) as normal bedrooms, dining rooms, living rooms, kitchens and habitable cellars and attics. About 56.7% of the total households were owner occupied, or in other words did not pay rent (though they may have a mortgage or a rent-to-own agreement).

As of 2000, there were 45 homes with 1 or 2 persons in the household, 178 homes with 3 or 4 persons in the household, and 202 homes with 5 or more persons in the household. As of 2000, there were 443 private households (homes and apartments) in the municipality, and an average of 2.7 persons per household. In 2008 there were 229 single family homes (or 35.7% of the total) out of a total of 642 homes and apartments. There were a total of 15 empty apartments for a 2.3% vacancy rate. As of 2007, the construction rate of new housing units was 3.9 new units per 1000 residents.

In the 2007 federal election the most popular party was the SVP which received 35.9% of the vote. The next three most popular parties were the CVP (31.9%), the FDP (11.6%) and the SP (10.1%).

The historical population is given in the following table:

Historical population
Year	Pop.	±%
1850	881	—
1900	703	−20.2%
1950	856	+21.8%
1980	956	+11.7%
2000	1,239	+29.6%

== Heritage sites of national significance ==
The Old Mill at Alikonerstrasse 6, the Catholic parish church in Auw, the St. Josephs chapel in Rüstenschwil village, and the eastern section of the house at Käsereistrasse 13 are listed as Swiss heritage sites of national significance.

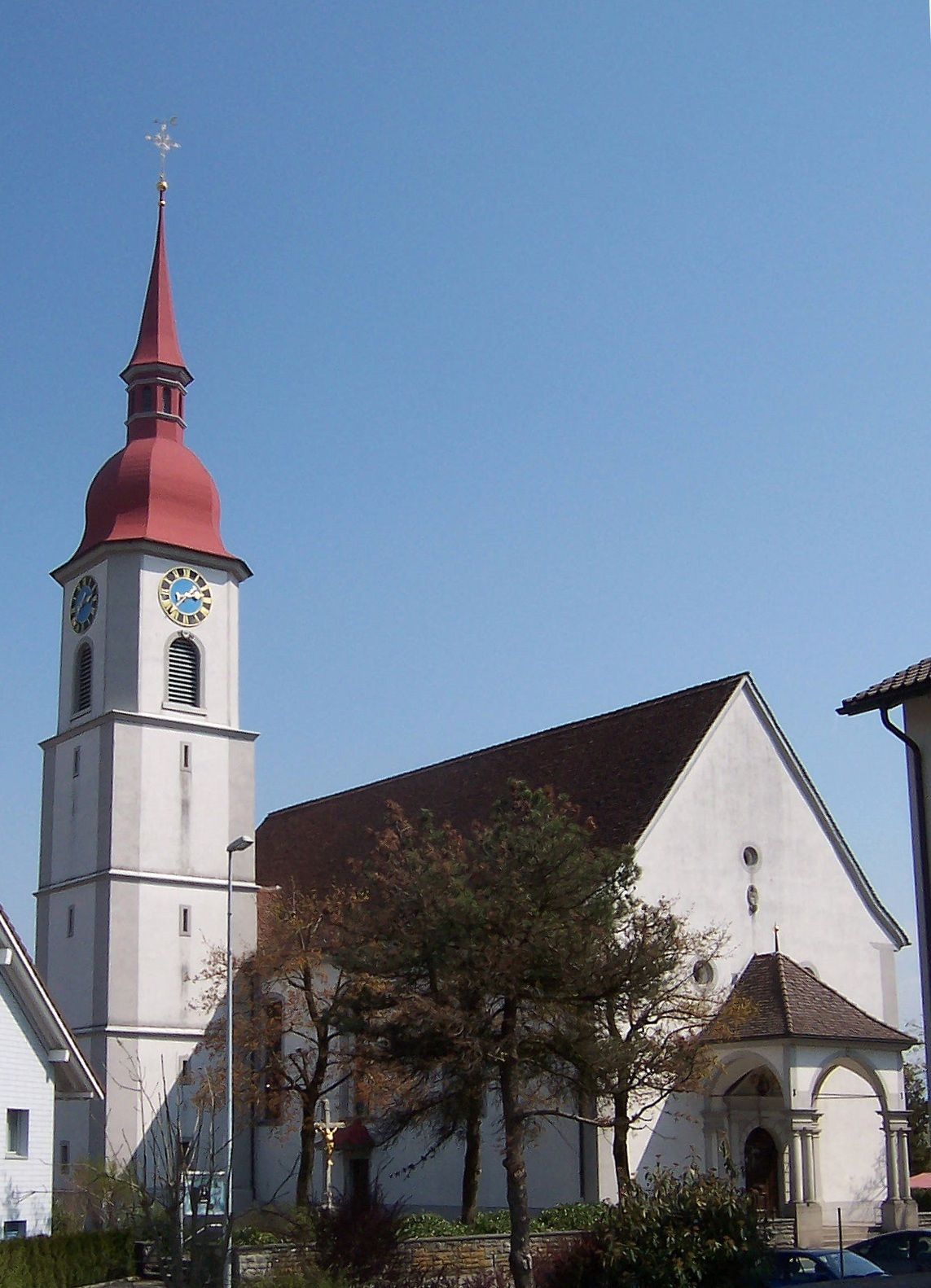
Parish church of St. Nikolaus in Auw

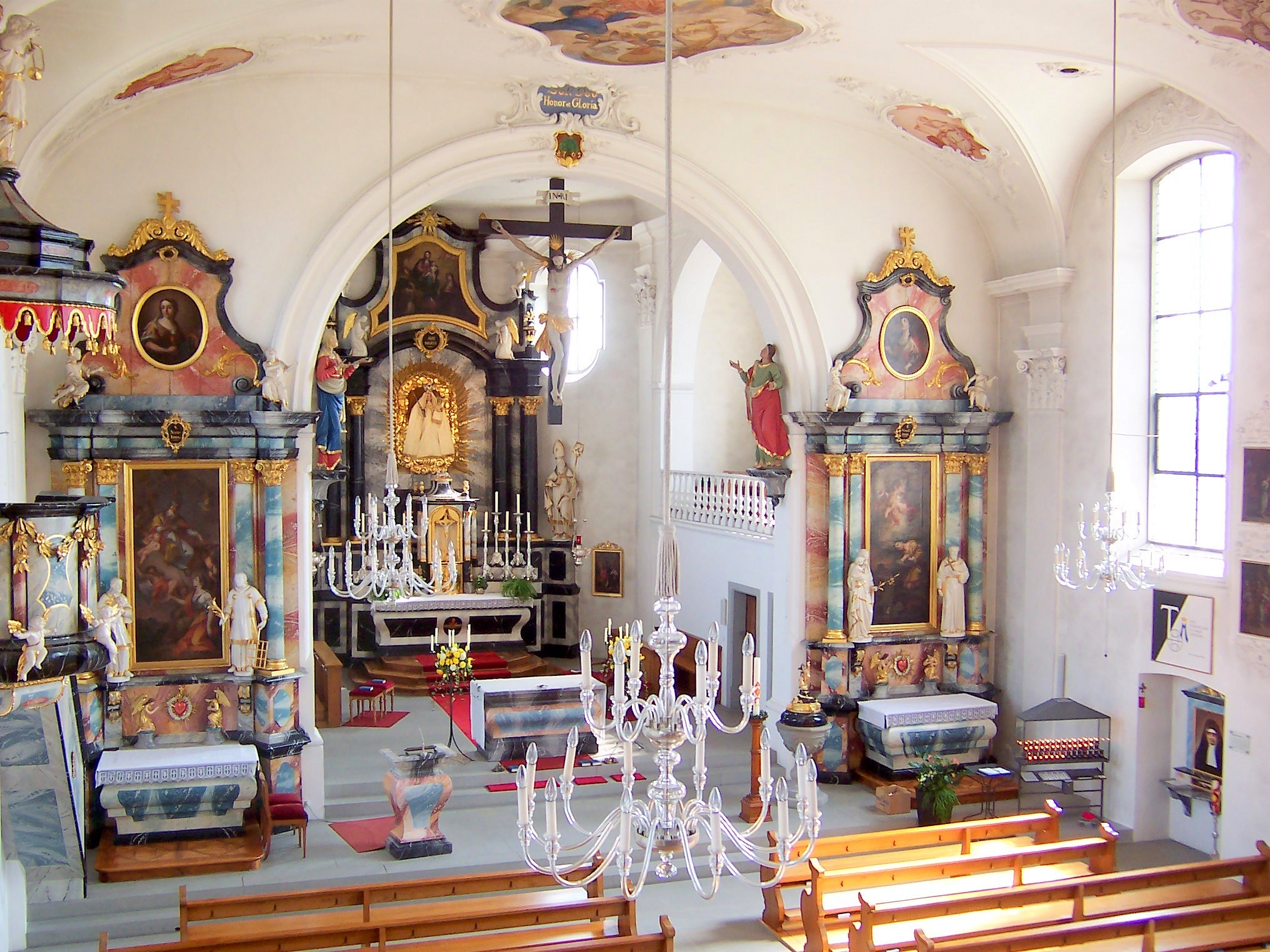
Interior of the church

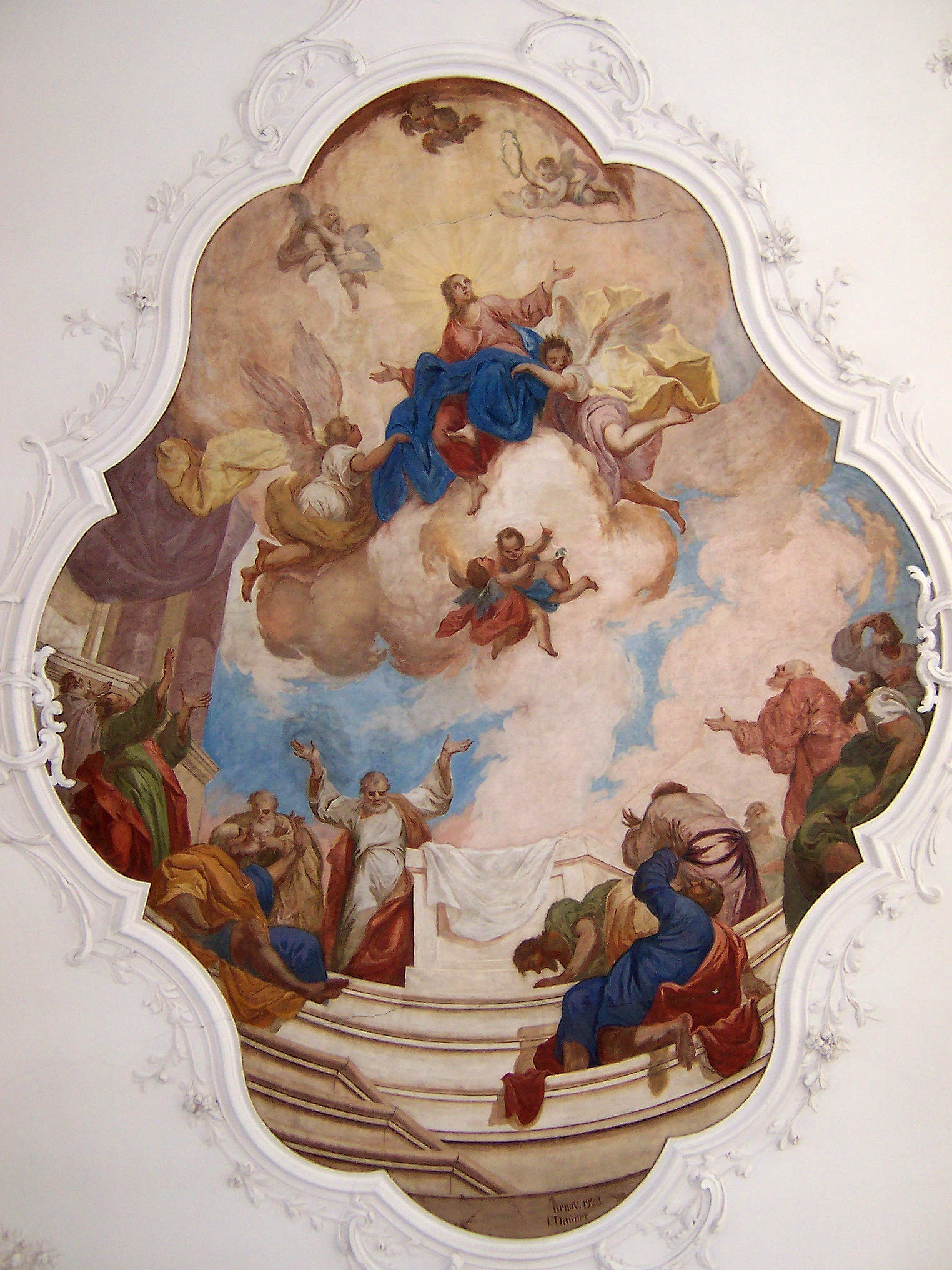
Fresco in the church

== Notable residents ==
- Maria Bernarda Bütler (1848–1924), a Swiss saint who founded the Congregation of the Franciscan Missionary Sisters of Mary, Help of Christians.

== Economy ==
As of 2007, Auw had an unemployment rate of 1.63%. As of 2005, there were 107 people employed in the primary economic sector and about 38 businesses involved in this sector. 103 people are employed in the secondary sector and there are 23 businesses in this sector. 144 people are employed in the tertiary sector, with 36 businesses in this sector.

In 2000 there were 683 workers who lived in the municipality. Of these, 521 or about 76.3% of the residents worked outside Auw while 116 people commuted into the municipality for work. There were a total of 278 jobs (of at least 6 hours per week) in the municipality. Of the working population, 5.9% used public transportation to get to work, and 57.7% used a private car.

== Religion ==
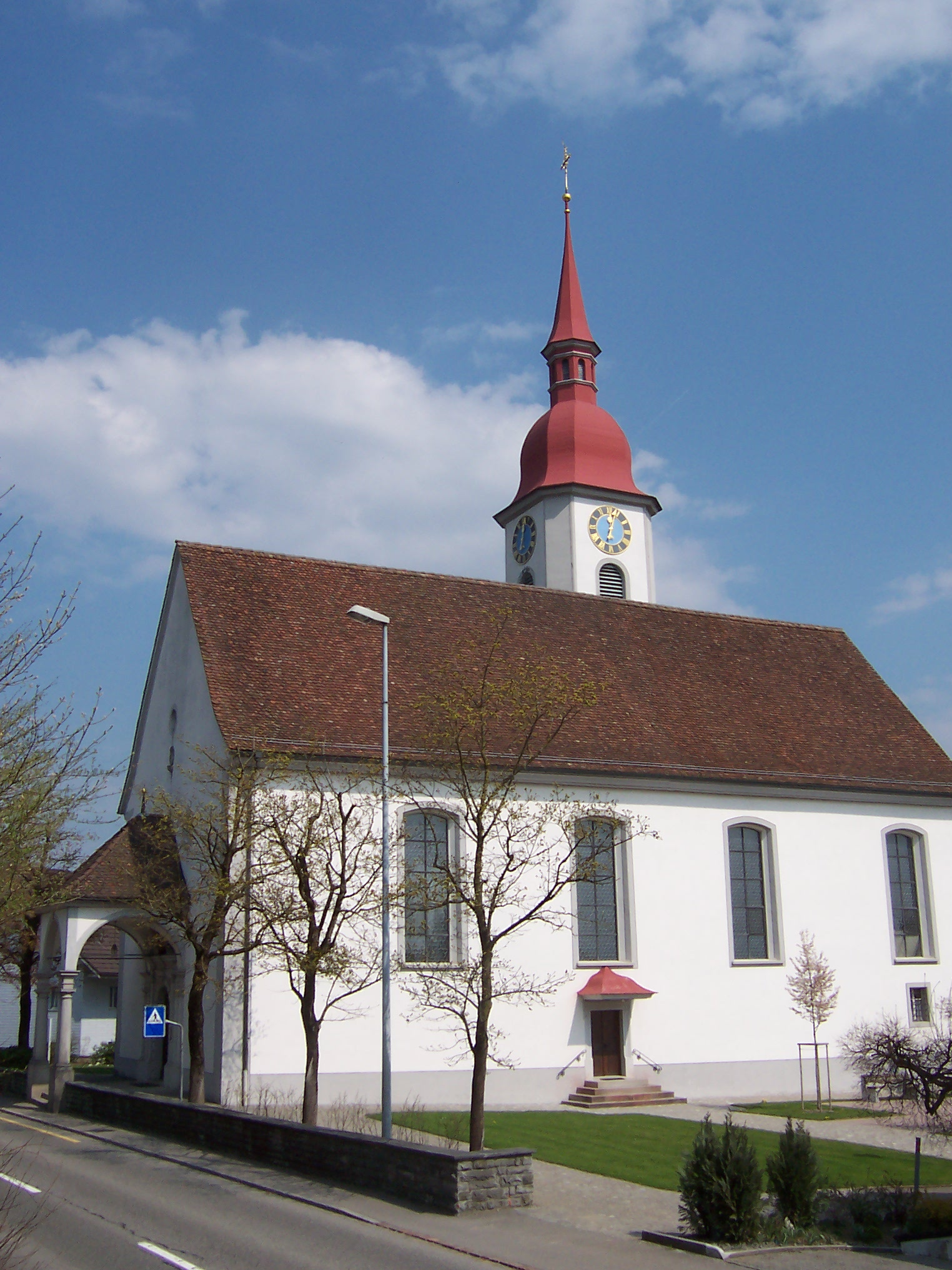
Parish church in Auw

From the 2000 census, 989 or 79.8% were Roman Catholic, while 132 or 10.7% belonged to the Swiss Reformed Church.

== Education ==
The entire Swiss population is generally well educated. In Auw about 77% of the population (between ages 25 and 64) have completed either non-mandatory upper secondary education or additional higher education (either university or a Fachhochschule). Of the school age population (in the 2008/2009 school year), there are 166 students attending primary school in the municipality.
