= Maria Bernarda Bütler =

Franciscan missionary (1848–1924)

Saint María Bernarda Bütler
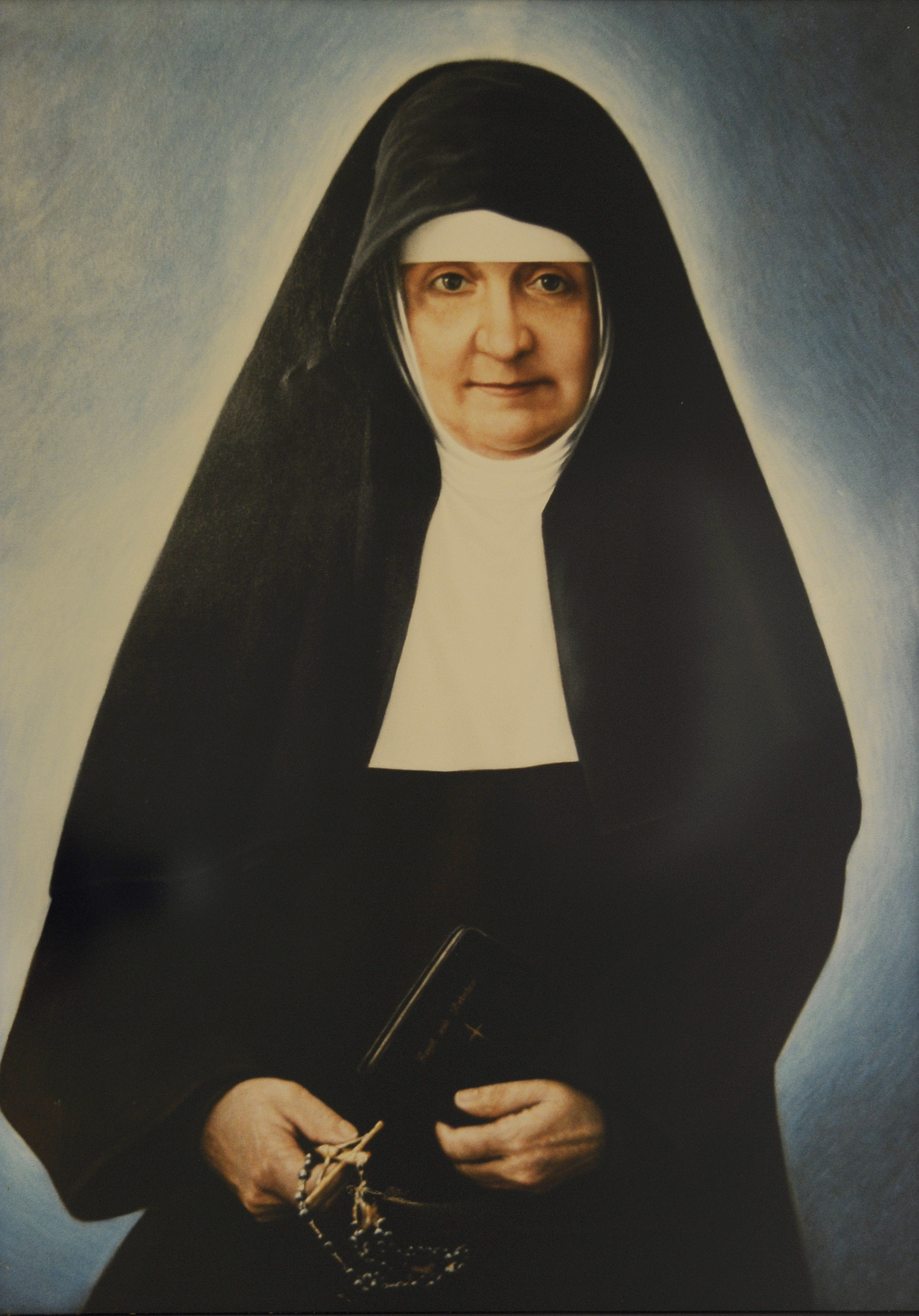

Virgin
- Born: 28 May 1848; Auw, Aargau, Switzerland
- Died: 19 May 1924 (aged 75); Cartagena, Bolívar, Colombia
- Venerated in: Roman Catholic Church
- Beatified: 29 October 1995, Saint Peter's Basilica by Pope John Paul II
- Canonized: 12 October 2008, Saint Peter's Square by Pope Benedict XVI
- Feast: 19 May

María Bernarda Bütler (28 May 1848 – 19 May 1924), born Verena Bütler, was a Swiss religious sister. She founded the Franciscan Missionary Sisters of Mary Help of Sinners and served in the missions in Ecuador and Colombia. Bütler worked for the care of the poor in these places until her exile from Ecuador and entrance into Colombia where she worked for the remainder of her life. The congregation moved there with her, and continued to expand during her time there until her death.

Bütler was beatified by Pope John Paul II on 29 October 1995, and canonised by Pope Benedict XVI on 12 October 2008.

== Life ==
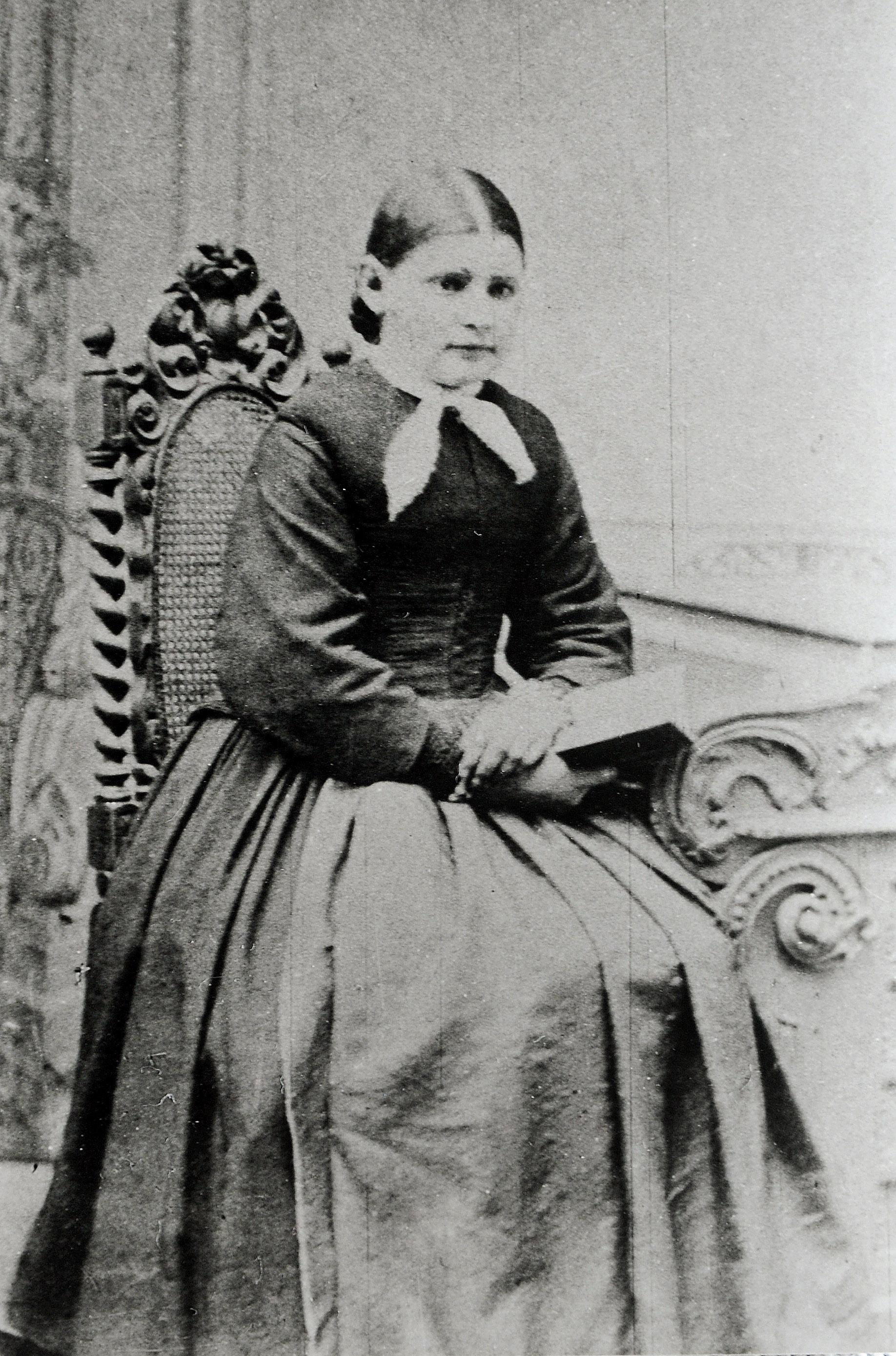
Photograph c. 1865

Verena Bütler was born in mid-1848 in Switzerland as the fourth of eight children to the farmers Henry and Catherine; she was baptized right after her birth. Her great-grandparents were Jeremias Bütler and Elisabeth Hoffmann; all her siblings were girls and one – Martina (1856–90) – became a Benedictine.

Bütler made her First Communion on 16 April 1860 after having received her confirmation in 1856. She finished school in 1862. Bütler became engaged at some stage to a man she loved but experienced a sudden religious experience that prompted her to break off her engagement in order to reflect on possible entrance into the religious life. She at first tried to enter the Sisters of the Holy Cross Menzingen in 1866 but left it after a brief period in order to return home and to discern her true calling.

Bütler joined the Franciscan Capuchin nuns at the convent of Mary Help of Sinners in Altstätten – at the encouragement of her local pastor – on 12 November 1867. On 4 May 1868, she assumed the habit, taking the religious name María Bernarda of the Heart of Mary. She made her solemn profession on 4 October 1871. She served as novice mistress from 1879 to 1880 and the superior of her house from 1880 until 1886.

At the invitation of Pedro Schumacher, the Bishop of Portoviejo, Bütler left for the missions in Ecuador on 19 June 1888 with six others and arrived on 29 July; there, she founded a religious congregation, the Franciscan Missionary Sisters of Mary Help of Sinners. In 1895 the period of anti-religious sentiment forced her and her fellow religious out of Ecuador to Colombia; she and fourteen others received an invitation from Bishop Eugenio Biffi to work in Cartagena in Colombia and Biffi received them on 2 August 1895. Her order received diocesan approval on 12 January 1912 as well as the decree of praise and papal approval from Pope Pius XI on 30 April 1929 and 5 July 1938. The order was aggregated to the Order of Friars Minor Capuchin on 26 June 1905.

Bütler died in mid-1924. The pastor of the cathedral announced her death: "A saint has died in this city this morning: the reverend Mother Bernarda!". Her remains were later relocated in 1956. In 2005 there were 788 religious in a total of 125 houses.

== Canonization ==
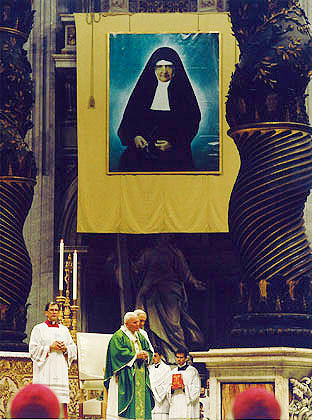
Beatification of Bütler in 1995

The sainthood process opened in Cartagena in an informative process that opened in 1949 and later concluded in 1952 while a team of theologians collated and approved all of her spiritual works and other writings on 8 May 1959; the formal introduction to the cause came under Pope Paul VI on 15 July 1974 and she was titled as a Servant of God. An apostolic process was held from 1976 until 1977 and these processes received validation from the Congregation for the Causes of Saints on 26 February 1982.

The C.C.S. received the Positio in 1988 and it led to theologians approving its contents on 5 April 1991 while the C.C.S also voted in favor of the cause on 15 October 1991. Pope John Paul II named her as Venerable on 21 December 1991 after confirming her heroic virtue. The miracle for beatification was investigated and then validated on 4 May 1992 while a medical board approved it on 17 June 1993; theologians also approved it on 26 November 1993 as did the C.C.S. on 18 January 1994. John Paul II approved this miracle on 26 March 1994 and later beatified her on 29 October 1995 in Saint Peter's Basilica. The beatification miracle was the rebuilding of missing cranial bones of the 15-day-old Liliana Sanchez in 1969. Rosmarie Wicki-Bütler and Burkard Bütler – her grandniece and grandnephew – represented the family at the 1995 beatification.

The second miracle was investigated in 2003 in Cartagena and later received validation on 15 October 2004. The medical board approved it on 23 March 2006 as did theologians on 1 December 2006 and the C.C.S. on 17 April 2007. Pope Benedict XVI approved it on 6 July 2007 and later canonized her as a saint on 12 October 2008 in Saint Peter's Square. The miracle was the 2 July 2002 cure of Myrna Jazime Correa from severe respiratory complications.
