= Dietwil =

- Municipality
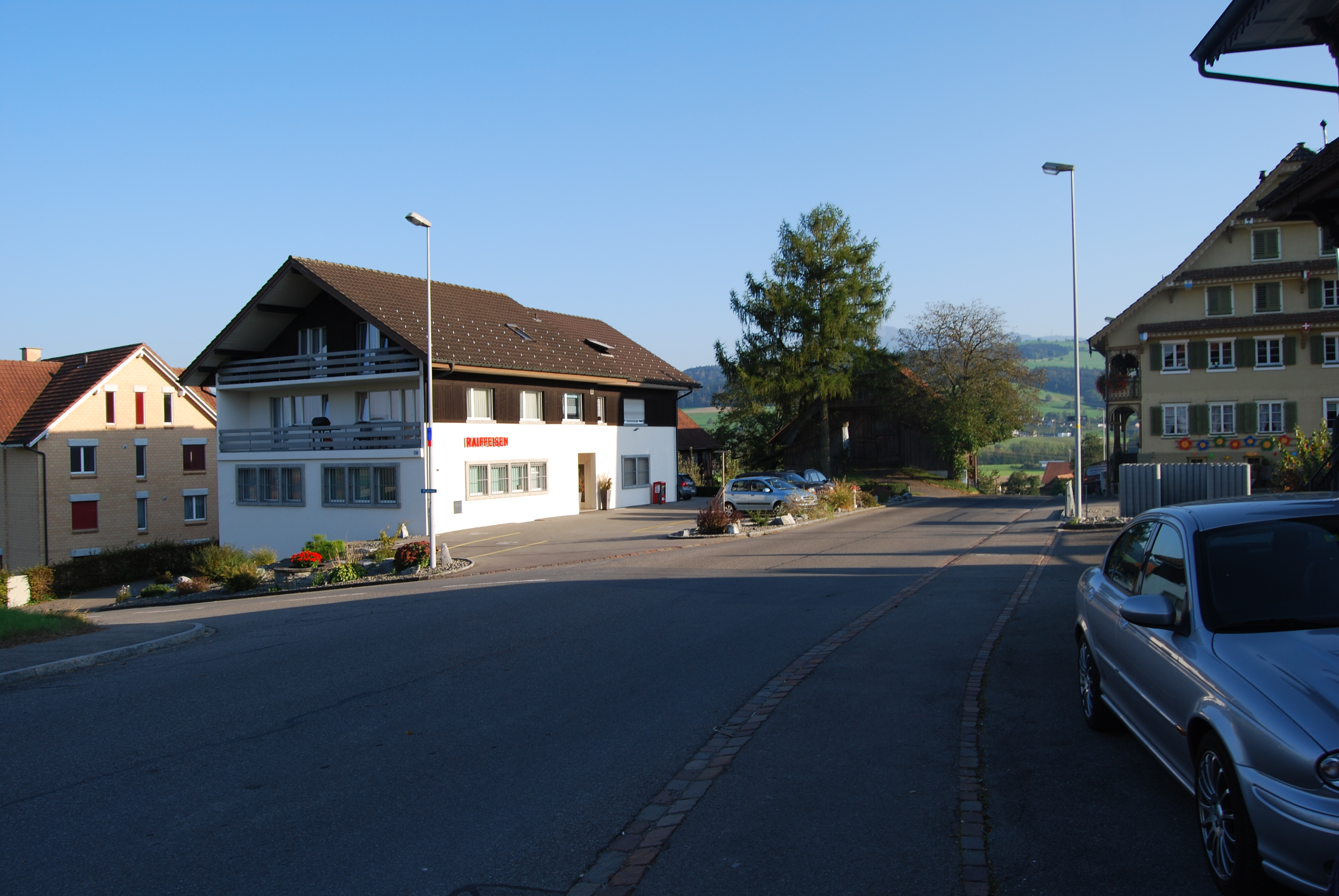

- Flag Coat of arms
- Location of Dietwil
- Location within Switzerland Location within Canton of Aargau
- Coordinates: 47°08′N 8°24′E
- Country: Switzerland
- Canton: Aargau
- District: Muri

Area
  - Total: 5.49 km^{2} (2.12 sq mi)
- Elevation: 424 m (1,391 ft)

Population (December 2020)
  - Total: 1,355
  - Density: 247/km^{2} (639/sq mi)
- Time zone: UTC+01:00 (CET)
  - Summer (DST): UTC+02:00 (CEST)
- Postal code: 6042
- SFOS number: 4231
- ISO 3166 code: CH-AG
- Surrounded by: Honau (LU), Hünenberg (ZG), Inwil (LU), Oberrüti, Risch (ZG), Sins
- Website: www.dietwil.ch

Dietwil is a municipality in the district of Muri in the canton of Aargau in Switzerland.

Aerial view (1953)

== History ==
Dietwil is first mentioned in 1236 as Tuetwile. To distinguish it from the municipality of Grossdietwil in Lucerne it was also called Kleindietwil or Dietwil im Reusstal.

At the beginning of the 15th century, the Lucerne von Moos family acquired the right to low justice in the village, which they relinquished in 1422 to Lucerne. After the conquest of the Aargau in 1415, the village came under the authority of the city of Lucerne and was part of the Meienberg district. In 1798 Dietwil's ties to Lucerne were severed. With the Act of Mediation in 1803, it became part of the newly created Canton of Aargau. In 1863 a decision of the Cantonal Council of Aargau naturalized all the gypsies who had settled in Dietwil after fleeing Napoleon's armies in Belarus.

In 1145 the Catholic parish church of St. James the elder was dedicated. It was replaced in 1780 by the current rococo aisleless church. Between 1370 and 1806, the Knights of Malta house at Hohenrain possessed the right of patronage.

The municipality has a little regional agricultural trade. The ferries from Eien and Gumpelsfahr connect Dietwil with Zug. The nearby on-ramp to the A14 Motorway, which runs from Zug to Lucerne, has led to growth in Dietwil. In 2000 about a third of the workers in Dietwil worked in agriculture and slightly more than half in the services sector.

== Geography ==
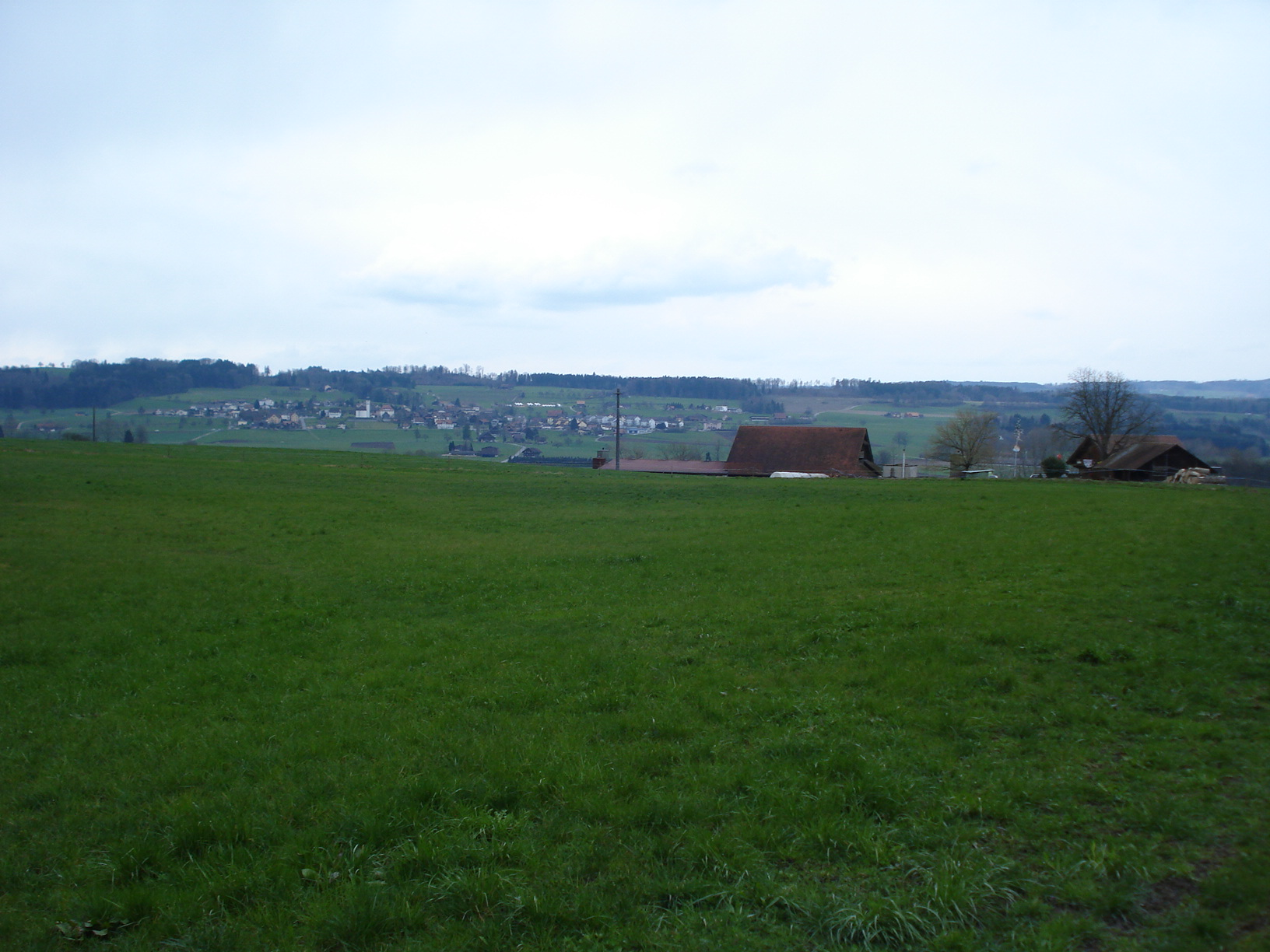
Fields around Dietwil

Dietwil has an area, as of 2009, of 5.5 square kilometers (2.1 sq mi). Of this area, 3.99 km^{2} (1.54 sq mi) or 72.5% is used for agricultural purposes, while 0.94 km^{2} (0.36 sq mi) or 17.1% is forested. Of the rest of the land, 0.49 km^{2} (0.19 sq mi) or 8.9% is settled (buildings or roads), 0.09 km^{2} (22 acres) or 1.6% is either rivers or lakes and 0.01 km^{2} (2.5 acres) or 0.2% is unproductive land.

Of the built up area, housing and buildings made up 5.3% and transportation infrastructure made up 2.7%. Out of the forested land, 15.5% of the total land area is heavily forested and 1.6% is covered with orchards or small clusters of trees. Of the agricultural land, 45.3% is used for growing crops and 24.9% is pastures, while 2.4% is used for orchards or vine crops. All the water in the municipality is in rivers and streams.

The municipality is located in the Muri district, on the Reuss river. It consists of the haufendorf village (an irregular, unplanned and quite closely packed village, built around a central square) of Dietwil and the hamlets of Eien and Gumpelsfahr. Bordered on two sides by the cantons of Zug and Lucerne, it is the southernmost village of that canton.

== Coat of arms ==
The blazon of the municipal coat of arms is Per fess Argent a Wall Anchor Cross Sable and Azure. It depicts a wall anchor and is derived from the arms of the Eschenbach family, founders of the local church.

== Demographics ==
Dietwil has a population (as of December 2020) of 1,355. As of June 2009, 8.6% of the population are foreign nationals. Over the last 10 years (1997–2007) the population has changed at a rate of 7.2%. Most of the population (as of 2000) speaks German (96.7%), with French being second most common ( 0.7%) and Albanian being third ( 0.6%).

The age distribution, as of 2008, in Dietwil is; 129 children or 11.3% of the population are between 0 and 9 years old and 153 teenagers or 13.4% are between 10 and 19. Of the adult population, 153 people or 13.4% of the population are between 20 and 29 years old. 189 people or 16.5% are between 30 and 39, 220 people or 19.2% are between 40 and 49, and 140 people or 12.2% are between 50 and 59. The senior population distribution is 79 people or 6.9% of the population are between 60 and 69 years old, 54 people or 4.7% are between 70 and 79, there are 24 people or 2.1% who are between 80 and 89, and there are 4 people or 0.3% who are 90 and older.

As of 2000 the average number of residents per living room was 0.6 which is about equal to the cantonal average of 0.57 per room. In this case, a room is defined as space of a housing unit of at least 4 m^{2} (43 sq ft) as normal bedrooms, dining rooms, living rooms, kitchens and habitable cellars and attics. About 51.4% of the total households were owner occupied, or in other words did not pay rent (though they may have a mortgage or a rent-to-own agreement).

As of 2000, there were 28 homes with 1 or 2 persons in the household, 171 homes with 3 or 4 persons in the household, and 157 homes with 5 or more persons in the household. As of 2000, there were 377 private households (homes and apartments) in the municipality, and an average of 2.7 persons per household. In 2008 there were 153 single family homes (or 33.2% of the total) out of a total of 461 homes and apartments. There were a total of 10 empty apartments for a 2.2% vacancy rate. As of 2007, the construction rate of new housing units was 24.5 new units per 1000 residents.

In the 2007 federal election the most popular party was the SVP which received 42.9% of the vote. The next three most popular parties were the CVP (27.5%), the FDP (12.3%) and the SP (7.6%).

The historical population is given in the following table:

Historical population
Year	Pop.	±%
1850	794	—
1900	560	−29.5%
1950	624	+11.4%
1980	633	+1.4%
2000	1,023	+61.6%

== Heritage sites of national significance ==
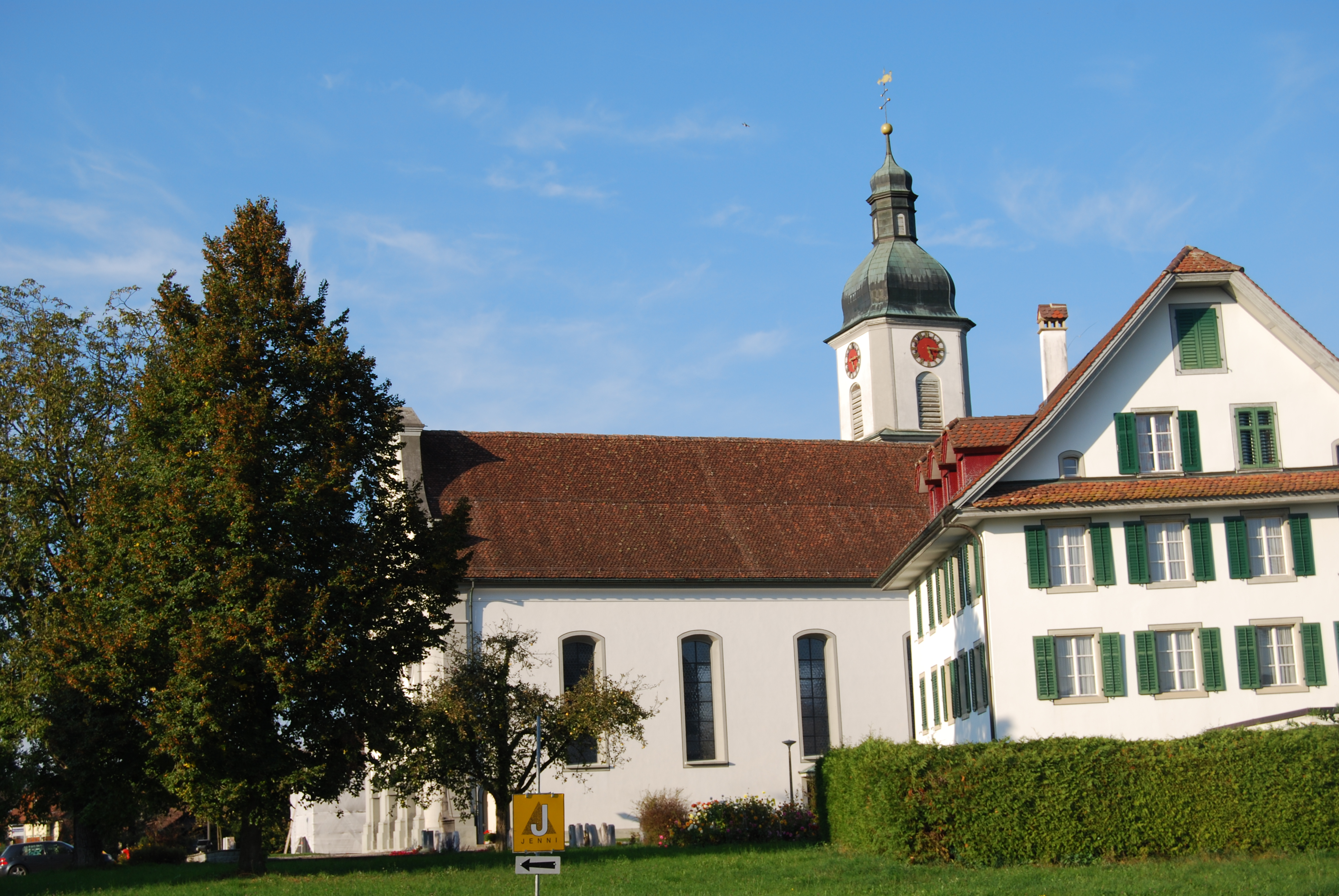
Church of Dietwil

The Catholic parish church of Dietwil is listed as a Swiss heritage site of national significance.

== Economy ==
As of 2007, Dietwil had an unemployment rate of 1.41%. As of 2005, there were 100 people employed in the primary economic sector and about 29 businesses involved in this sector. 17 people are employed in the secondary sector and there are 11 businesses in this sector. 57 people are employed in the tertiary sector, with 16 businesses in this sector.

In 2000 there were 552 workers who lived in the municipality. Of these, 436 or about 79.0% of the residents worked outside Dietwil while 61 people commuted into the municipality for work. There were a total of 177 jobs (of at least 6 hours per week) in the municipality. Of the working population, 8.2% used public transportation to get to work, and 60.4% used a private car.

== Religion ==
From the 2000 census, 794 or 77.6% were Roman Catholic, while 121 or 11.8% belonged to the Swiss Reformed Church.

== Education ==
The entire Swiss population is generally well educated. In Dietwil about 79.3% of the population (between age 25 and 64) have completed either non-mandatory upper secondary education or additional higher education (either university or a Fachhochschule). Of the school age population (in the 2008/2009 school year), there are 72 students attending primary school in the municipality.
