= Risch-Rotkreuz =

- Municipality
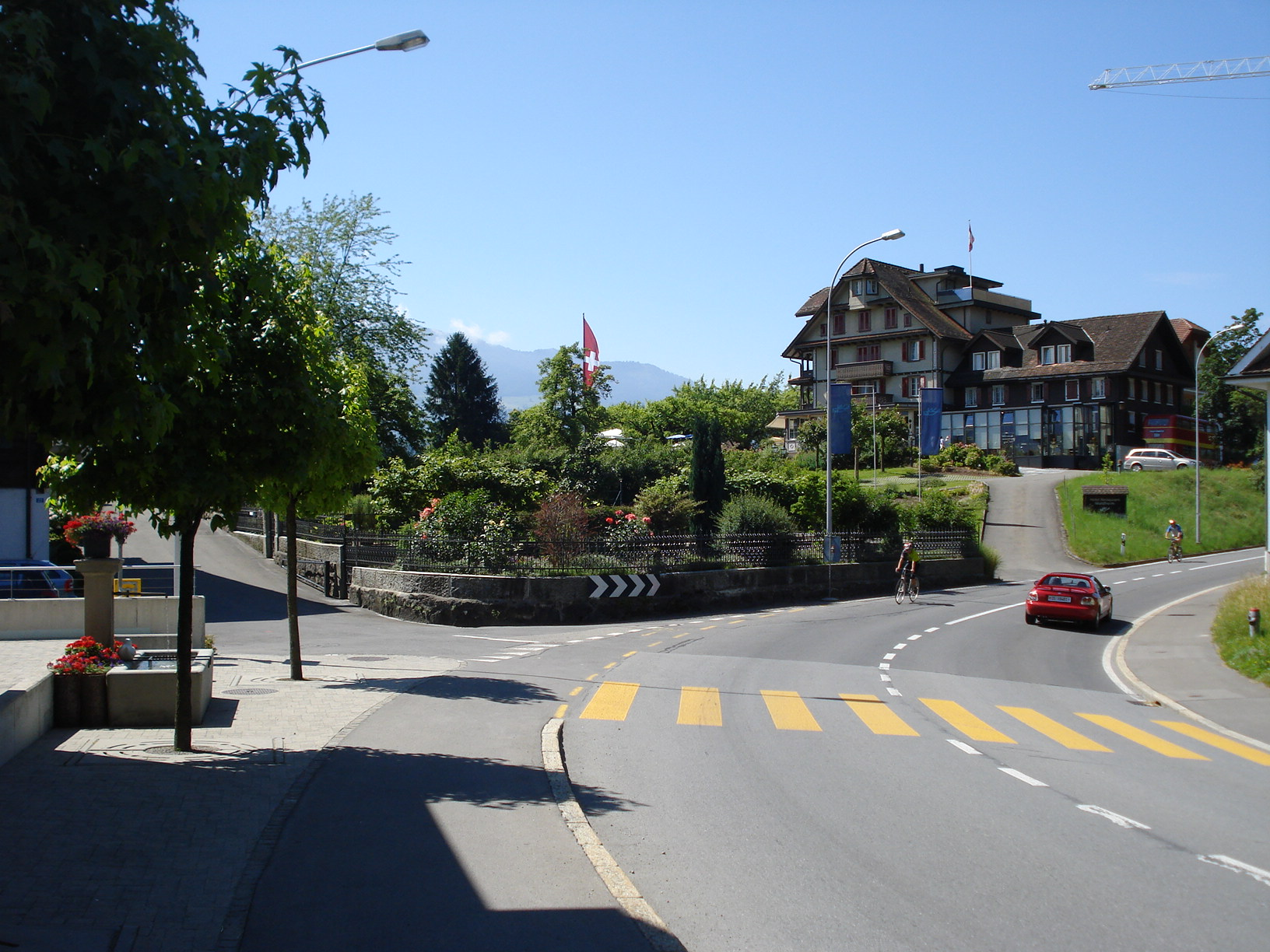

- Flag Coat of arms
- Location of Risch-Rotkreuz
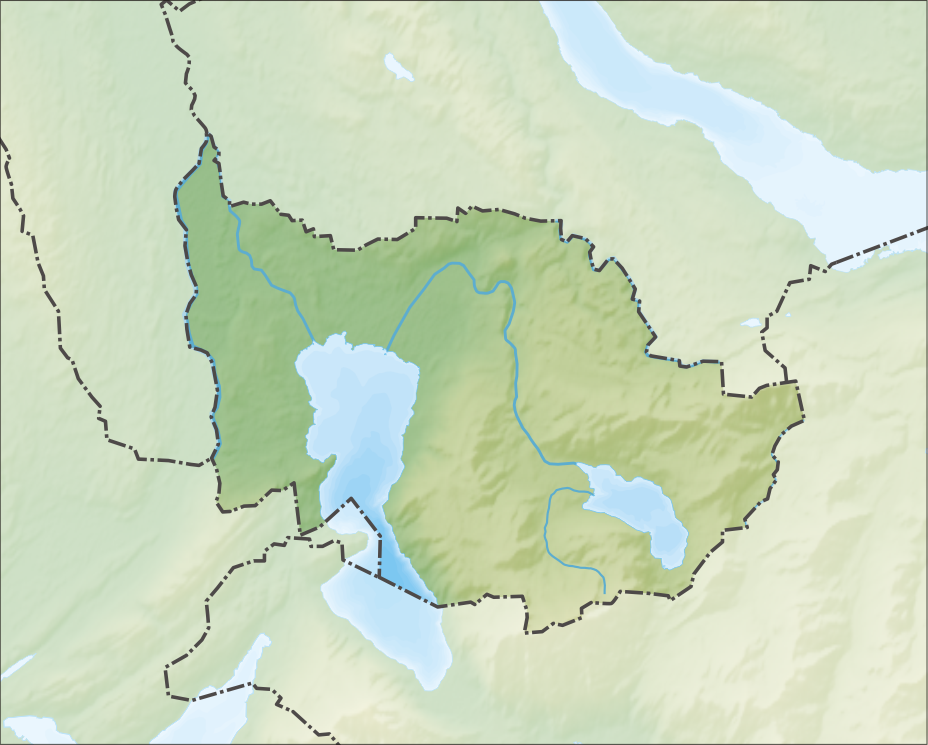
- Location within Switzerland Location within Canton of Zug
- Coordinates: 47°8′N 8°28′E
- Country: Switzerland
- Canton: Zug
- District: n.a.

Area
  - Total: 22.97 km^{2} (8.87 sq mi)
- Elevation (Railway station Rotkreuz): 429 m (1,407 ft)

Population (December 2020)
  - Total: 11,212
  - Density: 488.1/km^{2} (1,264/sq mi)
- Time zone: UTC+01:00 (CET)
  - Summer (DST): UTC+02:00 (CEST)
- Postal code: 6343
- SFOS number: 1707
- ISO 3166 code: CH-ZG
- Localities: Rotkreuz, Risch, Buonas, Holzhäusern
- Surrounded by: Cham, Dietwil (AG), Honau (LU), Hünenberg, Küssnacht (SZ), Meierskappel (LU), Oberrüti (AG), Root (LU), Zug
- Twin towns: Risch: Amaroni (Italy)
- Website: www.rischrotkreuz.ch

Risch is a municipality in the canton of Zug in Switzerland. It is also promoted as Risch-Rotkreuz. Four villages (Rotkreuz, Risch, Buonas and Holzhäusern) belong to the municipality Risch. On 24 November 2007, it was decided to promote the municipality as Risch-Rotkreuz. The change was made because the village Rotkreuz has become much bigger than Risch.

== Geography ==
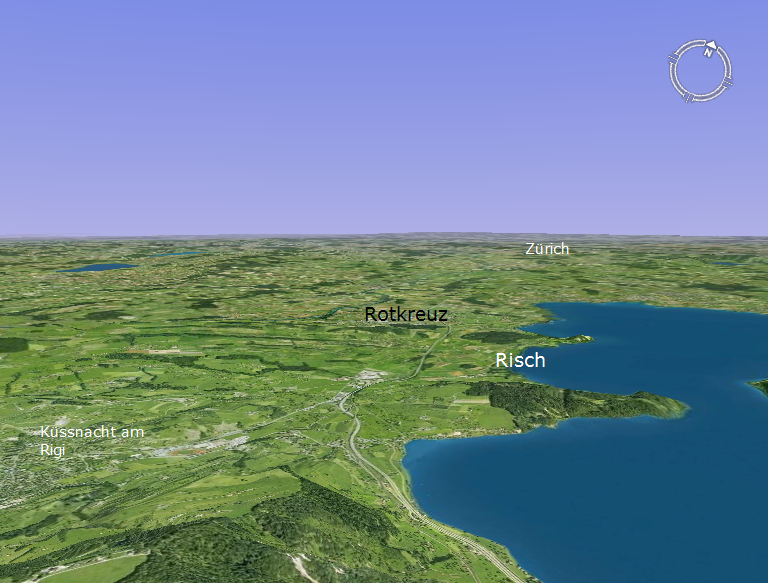
View from the Rigi toward Risch and Rotkreuz

The municipality is between the Lake of Zug and the river Reuss. In the south, the Rooterberg is a part of the municipality. Many little rivers and two little lakes flow in Risch-Rotkreuz. The municipality historically consists of the four villages of Risch, Buonas and Holzhäusern and Rotkreuz.

Risch had an area, as of 2006, of 14.8 km^{2} (5.7 sq mi). Of this area, 61% is used for agricultural purposes, while 15.4% is forested. Of the rest of the land, 21.3% is settled (buildings or roads) and the remainder (2.4%) is non-productive (rivers, glaciers or mountains). The combined municipality of Risch-Rotkreuz has an area of 22.9 km^{2} (8.8 sq mi).

== Demographics ==
Risch-Rotkreuz has a population (as of 31 December 2020) of 11,212. As of 2020, about 27.1% of the population was made up of foreign nationals. Over the last 10 years the population has grown at a rate of 29.3%. Most of the population (as of 2000) speaks German (84.3%), with Serbo-Croatian being second most common (3.3%) and Italian being third (2.7%).

The population of Risch is 337, while Rotkreuz has a population of 7,425.

In the 2007 federal election the most popular party was the SVP which received 34.1% of the vote. The next three most popular parties were the FDP (28.6%), the CVP (18.2%) and the Green Party (12.2%).

In Risch about 71.5% of the population (between age 25-64) have completed either non-mandatory upper secondary education or additional higher education (either university or a Fachhochschule).

The majority of the population is Roman Catholic (58%). Of the rest of the population, 14.1% belong to the Swiss Reformed Church, 14.7% belong to another church and 13.2% do not belong to any organized church.

== Economy ==
The largest firm in Risch-Rotkreuz is Roche Diagnostics International AG.

Risch-Rotkreuz has an unemployment rate of 2.3%. As of 2005, there were 145 people employed in the primary economic sector and about 47 businesses involved in this sector. 2,162 people are employed in the secondary sector and there are 95 businesses in this sector. 4,220 people are employed in the tertiary sector, with 576 businesses in this sector.

== Transportation ==
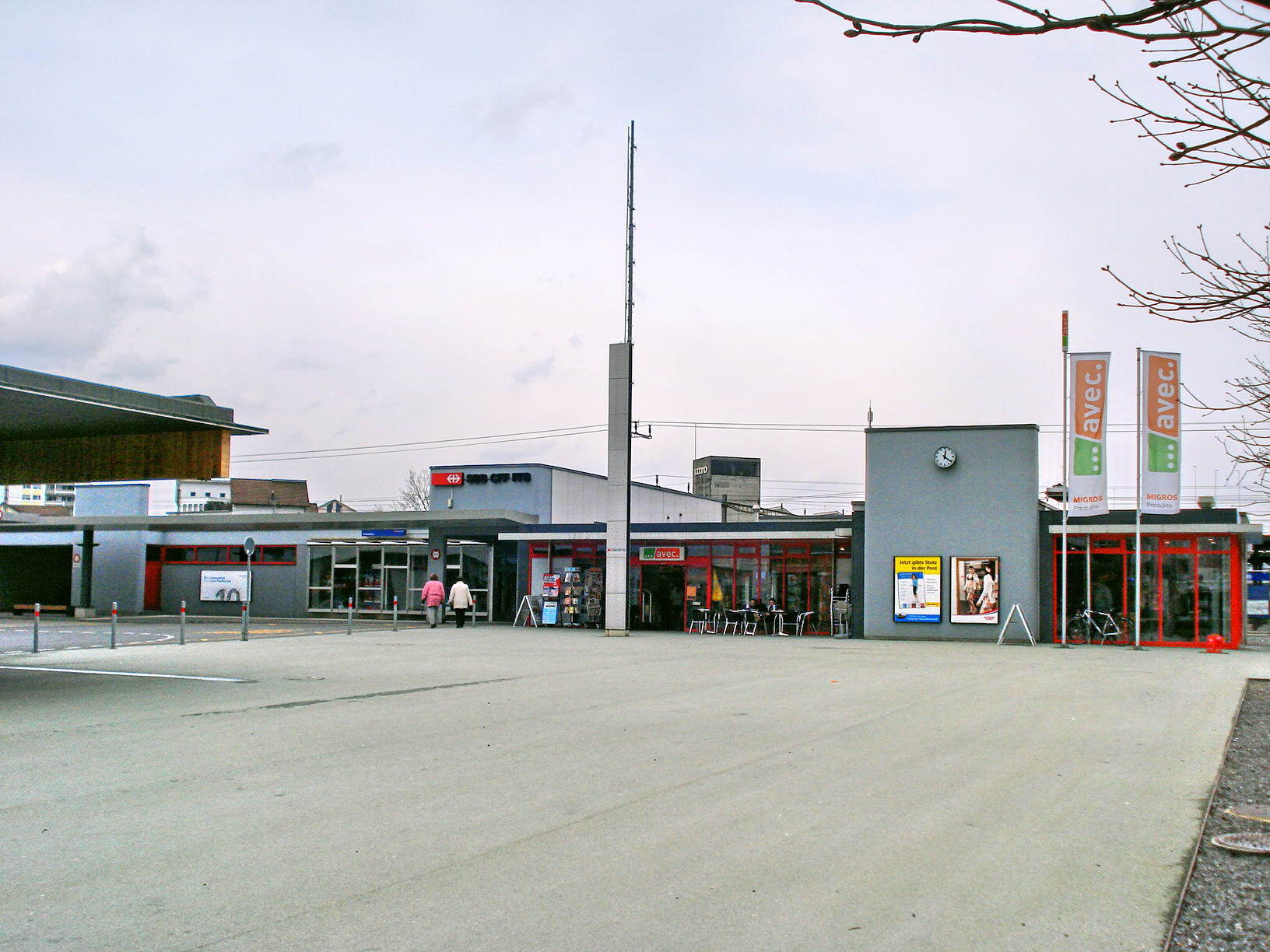
Rotkreuz train station

Risch-Rotkreuz is near the two motorways A4 and A14. By train, you can reach the municipality with the SBB. There is a very important station in Rotkreuz because the railway line crossing the Alps via the Gotthard Pass crosses the Intercity line from Zürich to Lucerne here. On the lake you can go by ship to Cham, Zug and Arth.

== Education ==
SIS Swiss International School Rotkreuz-Zug is in the city.

== Sights ==
- Castle of Buonas.
- Castle of Freudenberg.
- Church St. Verena in Risch.
- Church St. German in Buonas.
- Church St. Wendelin in Holzhäusern.

== Notable people ==
- Monika Dettwiler (born 1948) a Swiss-Italian journalist and author, lives in Risch-Rotkreuz
- Daniel Vasella (born 1953) a Swiss medical doctor, author, and former CEO and chairman of the Swiss pharmaceutical company Novartis AG, lives in Risch
- Sean Simpson (born 1960) is a Canadian ice hockey coach, a former professional ice hockey player and the head coach for Swiss national ice hockey team, lives in Risch-Rotkreuz.
