= Hohenrain =

- Municipality
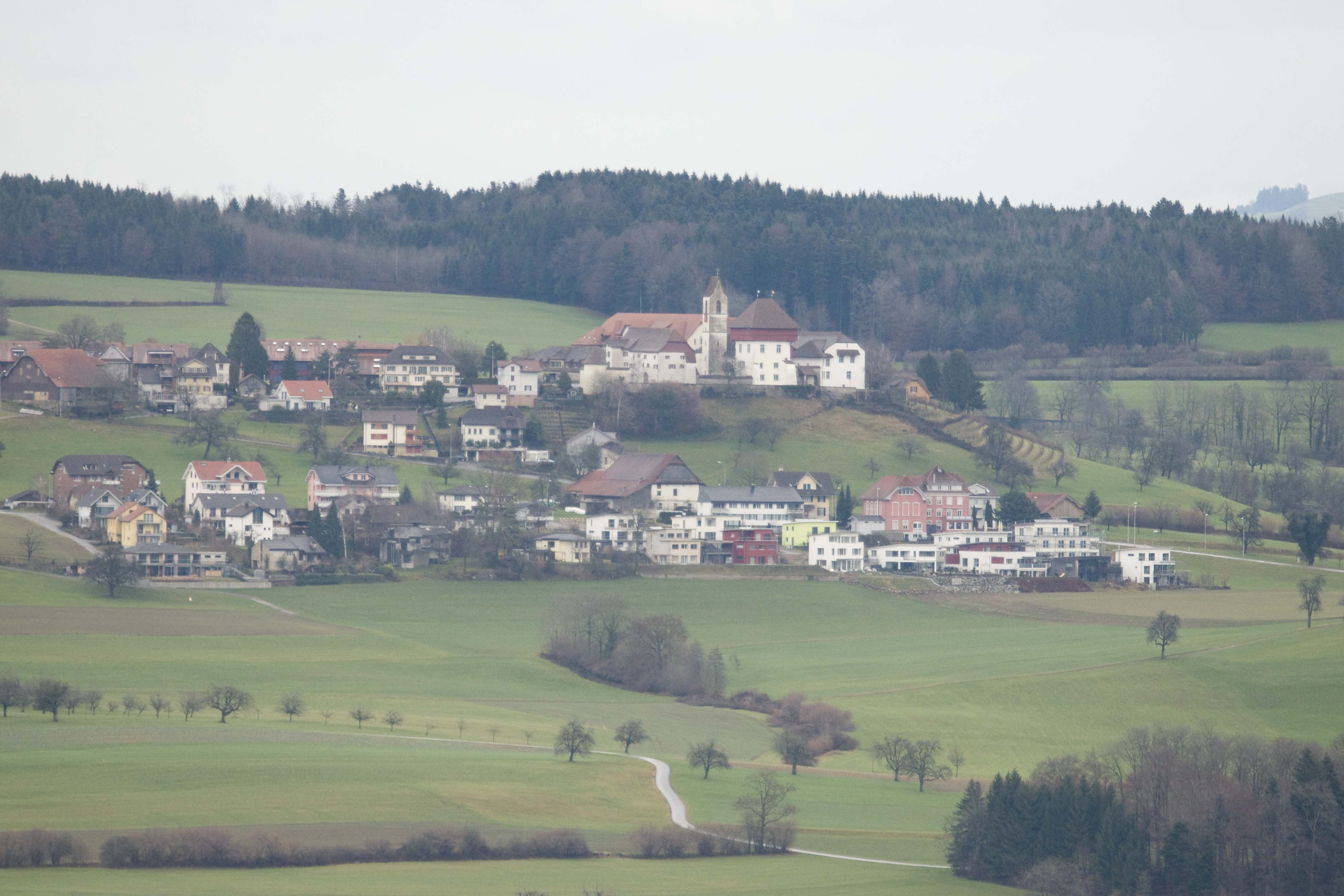

- Coat of arms
- Location of Hohenrain
- Location within Switzerland Location within Canton of Lucerne
- Coordinates: 47°11′N 8°19′E
- Country: Switzerland
- Canton: Lucerne
- District: Hochdorf

Area
  - Total: 23.4 km^{2} (9.0 sq mi)
- Elevation: 609 m (1,998 ft)

Population (December 2020)
  - Total: 2,429
  - Density: 104/km^{2} (269/sq mi)
- Time zone: UTC+01:00 (CET)
  - Summer (DST): UTC+02:00 (CEST)
- Postal code: 6276
- SFOS number: 1032
- ISO 3166 code: CH-LU
- Surrounded by: Abtwil (AG), Auw (AG), Ballwil, Beinwil (Freiamt) (AG), Gelfingen, Hochdorf, Lieli, Römerswil, Sins (AG)
- Website: www.hohenrain.ch

Hohenrain is a municipality in the district of Hochdorf in the canton of Lucerne in Switzerland. Since January 1, 2007, Lieli has been part of the municipality.

== History ==
Hohenrain is first mentioned in 1182-83 as Hohenrein.

== Geography ==
Aerial view (1964)

Hohenrain is located in the Seetal valley, on the western slope of Lindenberg mountain above Lake Baldegg.

The municipality consists of the village of Hohenrain, the former municipality of Liehi and the hamlets of Kleinwangen and several smaller settlements. It has an area of 23.4 km^{2} (9.0 sq mi). Of this area, 75.5% is used for agricultural purposes, while 19% is forested. The rest of the land, (5.6%) is settled. In the 1997 land survey, 19.06% of the total land area was forested. Of the agricultural land, 69.1% is used for farming or pastures, while 6.28% is used for orchards or vine crops. Of the settled areas, 3.21% is covered with buildings, 0.13% is industrial, 0.3% is classed as special developments, 0.04% is parks or greenbelts and 1.88% is transportation infrastructure.

== Demographics ==
Hohenrain has a population of 2,429 as of 31 December 2020. As of 2007, 6.6% of the population was made up of foreign nationals. Over the last 10 years, the population has grown at a rate of 4.2%. Most of the population (as of 2000) speaks German (95.9%), with Albanian being second most common ( 1.0%) and Portuguese being third ( 0.5%).

In the 2007 election the most popular party was the CVP which received 41.3% of the vote. The next three most popular parties were the SVP (30.1%), the FDP (15.2%) and the Green Party (5.9%).

The age distribution in Hohenrain is; 693 people or 29.1% of the population is 0–19 years old. 575 people or 24.2% are 20–39 years old, and 857 people or 36% are 40–64 years old. The senior population distribution is 188 people or 7.9% are 65–79 years old, 58 or 2.4% are 80–89 years old and 8 people or 0.3% of the population are 90+ years old.

The Swiss population is generally well educated. In Hohenrain about 76.3% of the population (between age 25-64) have completed either non-mandatory upper secondary education or additional higher education (either university or a Fachhochschule).

As of 2000 there are 736 households, of which 155 households (or about 21.1%) contain only a single individual. 168 or about 22.8% are large households, with at least five members. As of 2000 there were 530 inhabited buildings in the municipality, of which 354 were built only as housing, and 176 were mixed use buildings. There were 271 single family homes, 58 double family homes, and 25 multi-family homes in the municipality. Most homes were either two (222) or three (101) story structures. There were only 18 single story buildings and 13 four or more story buildings.

Hohenrain has an unemployment rate of 1.29%. As of 2005, there were 335 people employed in the primary economic sector and about 120 businesses involved in this sector. 110 people are employed in the secondary sector and there are 23 businesses in this sector. 467 people are employed in the tertiary sector, with 55 businesses in this sector. As of 2000 49.8% of the population of the municipality were employed in some capacity. At the same time, females made up 40.7% of the workforce.

In the 2000 census the religious membership of Hohenrain was; 2,024 (82.9%) were Roman Catholic, and 184 (7.5%) were Protestant, with an additional 10 (0.41%) that were of some other Christian faith. There are 1 individuals (0.04% of the population) who are Jewish. There are 35 individuals (1.43% of the population) who are Muslim. Of the rest; there were 15 (0.61%) individuals who belong to another religion, 92 (3.77%) who do not belong to any organized religion, 81 (3.32%) who did not answer the question.

The historical population is given in the following table:

year	population
1798	1,228
1816	1,741
1850	2,008
1900	1,685
1950	2,092
2000	2,240
