= Meienberg =

Meienberg is a surname. Notable people with the surname include:

- Niklaus Meienberg (1940–1993), Swiss writer and journalist
- Peter Hildebrand Meienberg (1929–2021), Swiss Benedictine missionary

== See also ==
- Merenberg
