= Ballwil =

- Municipality
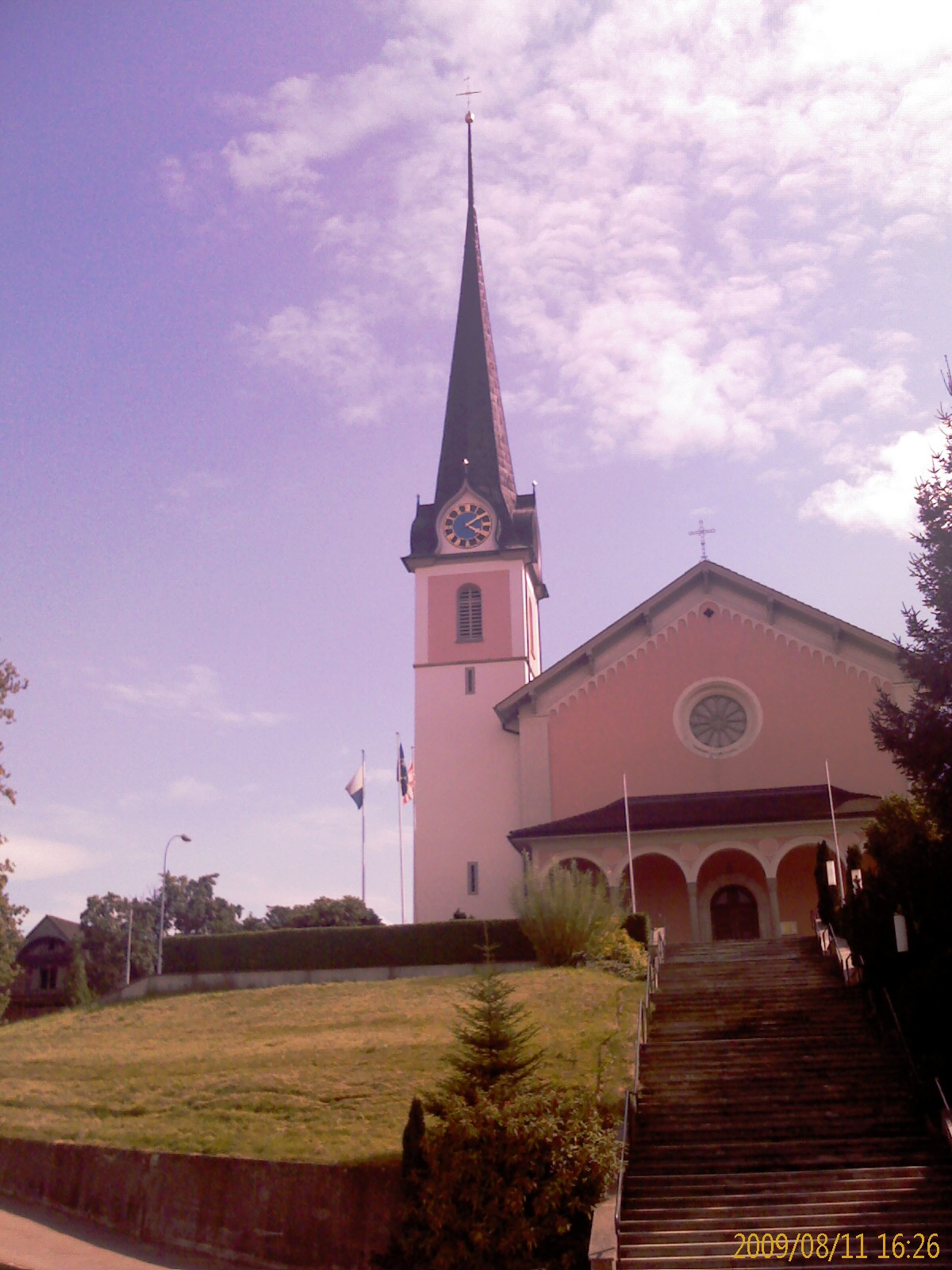

- Coat of arms
- Location of Ballwil
- Location within Switzerland Location within Canton of Lucerne
- Coordinates: 47°9′N 8°19′E
- Country: Switzerland
- Canton: Lucerne
- District: Hochdorf

Government
  - Mayor (list): Benno Büeler

Area
  - Total: 8.77 km^{2} (3.39 sq mi)
- Elevation: 515 m (1,690 ft)

Population (December 2020)
  - Total: 2,679
  - Density: 305/km^{2} (791/sq mi)
- Time zone: UTC+01:00 (CET)
  - Summer (DST): UTC+02:00 (CEST)
- Postal code: 6275
- SFOS number: 1023
- ISO 3166 code: CH-LU
- Surrounded by: Eschenbach, Hochdorf, Hohenrain, Inwil, Sins (AG)
- Website: www.ballwil.ch

Ballwil is a municipality in the district of Hochdorf in the canton of Lucerne in Switzerland.

== History ==
Ballwil is first mentioned in 924 as Paldiwilare.

== Geography ==
Aerial view (1962)

Ballwil is located in the Seetal valley, south of Lake Baldegg.

The municipality has an area of 8.7 km^{2} (3.4 sq mi). Of this area, 76.7% is used for agricultural purposes, while 11.7% is forested. Of the rest of the land, 11.3% is settled (buildings or roads) and the remainder (0.2%) is non-productive (rivers, glaciers or mountains). In the 1997 land survey, 11.68% of the total land area was forested. Of the agricultural land, 74% is used for farming or pastures, while 2.75% is used for orchards or vine crops. Of the settled areas, 5.27% is covered with buildings, 0.8% is industrial, 1.95% is classed as special developments, 0.11% is parks or greenbelts and 3.21% is transportation infrastructure.

The municipality lies on the western slope of Mount Lindenberg, near the Reuss River. The main village and many numerous hamlets belong to the municipality. The largest of the hamlets are Gibelflüh (elev. 499 m (1,637 ft), 2.5 km (1.6 mi) east of the village, first mentioned 1184/90), Gerlingen (elev. 476 m (1,562 ft), 1.1 km (0.68 mi) south-east of the village, first mentioned in 1302), Wald (elev. 475 m (1,558 ft), 2.5 km (1.6 mi) south-east of the village), Wissenwegen (2.1 km (1.3 mi) east), and Mettenwil.

== Neighboring municipalities ==
The neighboring municipalities are listed in clockwise order, beginning in the north: Hohenrain, Sins in Canton Aargau, Inwil, Eschenbach, and Hochdorf.

== Demographics ==
Ballwil has a population (as of 31 December 2020) of 2,679. As of 2007, 5.5% of the population was made up of foreign nationals. Over the last 10 years the population has grown at a rate of 12.8%. Most of the population (as of 2000) speaks German (95.6%), with Albanian being second most common (1.0%) and Serbo-Croatian being third (0.9%).

In the 2007 election the most popular party was the SVP which received 34.7% of the vote. The next three most popular parties were the CVP (33.6%), the FDP (18.1%) and the SPS (6.6%).

The age distribution in Ballwil is; 612 people or 25.1% of the population is 0–19 years old. 672 people or 27.5% are 20–39 years old, and 886 people or 36.3% are 40–64 years old. The senior population distribution is 203 people or 8.3% are 65–79 years old, 57 or 2.3% are 80–89 years old and 12 people or 0.5% of the population are 90+ years old.

The entire Swiss population is generally well educated. In Ballwil about 74.4% of the population (between age 25-64) have completed either non-mandatory upper secondary education or additional higher education (either University or a Fachhochschule). As of 2000 there are 791 households, of which 197 households (or about 24.9%) contain only a single individual. 85 or about 10.7% are large households, with at least five members. As of 2000 there were 378 inhabited buildings in the municipality, of which 271 were built only as housing, and 107 were mixed use buildings. There were 178 single family homes, 46 double family homes, and 47 multi-family homes in the municipality. Most homes were either two (164) or three (65) story structures. There were only 21 single story buildings and 21 four or more story buildings.

Ballwil has an unemployment rate of 0.97%. As of 2005, there were 140 people employed in the primary economic sector and about 47 businesses involved in this sector. 342 people are employed in the secondary sector and there are 42 businesses in this sector. 327 people are employed in the tertiary sector, with 73 businesses in this sector. As of 2000 57.8% of the population of the municipality were employed in some capacity. At the same time, females made up 41.2% of the workforce.

In the 2000 census the religious membership of Ballwil was; 1,731 (82.%) were Roman Catholic, and 163 (7.7%) were Protestant, with an additional 49 (2.32%) that were of some other Christian faith. There are 12 individuals (0.57% of the population) who are Muslim. Of the rest; there were 5 (0.24%) individuals who belong to another religion, 96 (4.55%) who do not belong to any organized religion, 56 (2.65%) who did not answer the question.

The historical population is given in the following graph:

== Notable residents ==
Thomas Häberli - professional footballer, currently with BSC Young Boys, grew up in the village and still lives there to this day.
