= Mühlau =

- Municipality
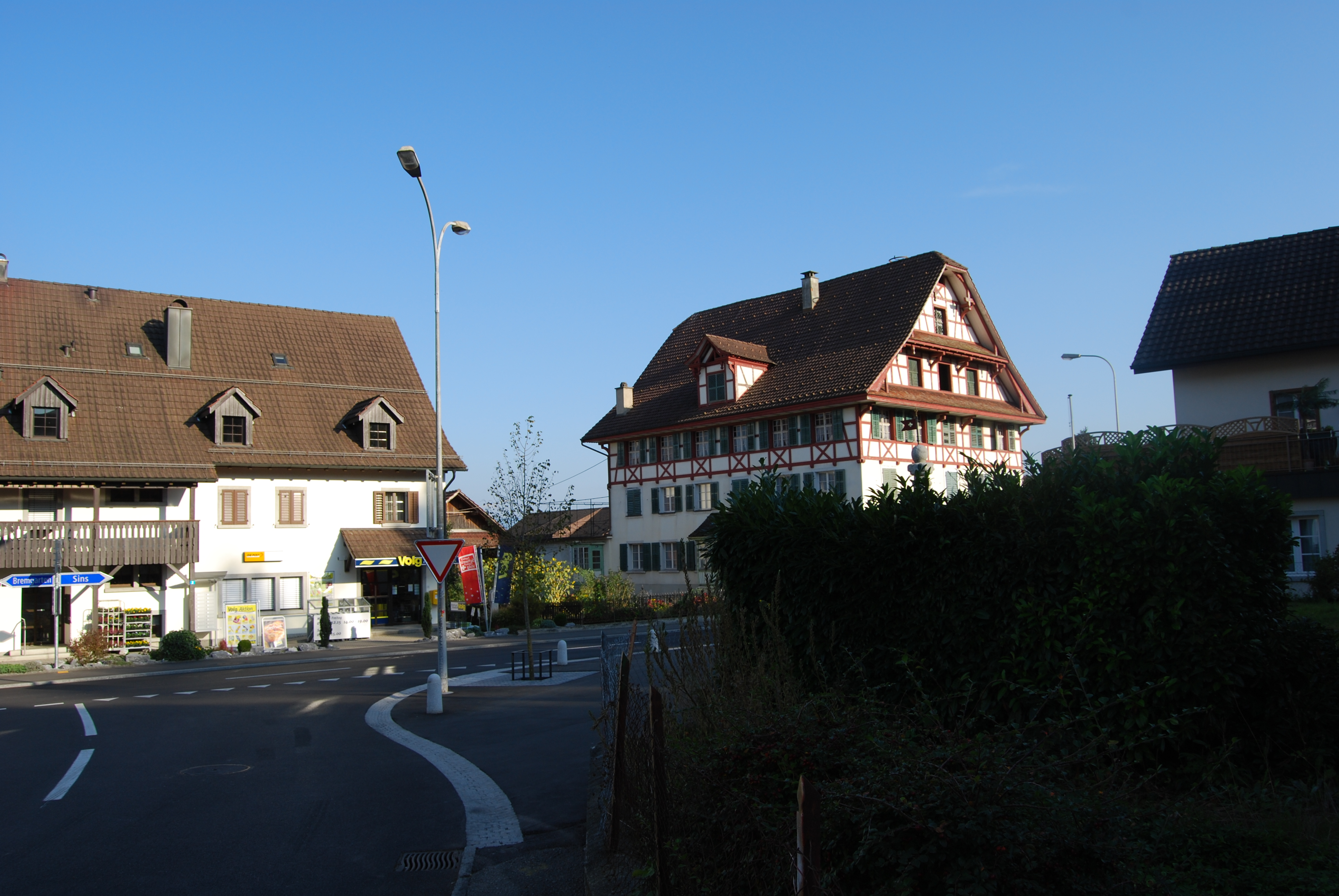

- Flag Coat of arms
- Location of Mühlau
- Location within Switzerland Location within Canton of Aargau
- Coordinates: 47°14′N 8°24′E
- Country: Switzerland
- Canton: Aargau
- District: Muri

Area
  - Total: 5.52 km^{2} (2.13 sq mi)
- Elevation: 396 m (1,299 ft)

Population (December 2006)
  - Total: 1,008
  - Density: 183/km^{2} (473/sq mi)
- Time zone: UTC+01:00 (CET)
  - Summer (DST): UTC+02:00 (CEST)
- Postal code: 5642
- SFOS number: 4235
- ISO 3166 code: CH-AG
- Surrounded by: Auw, Beinwil (Freiamt), Benzenschwil, Hünenberg (ZG), Merenschwand, Sins
- Website: www.muehlau.ch

Mühlau (German pronunciation: [ˈmyːlaʊ]) is a municipality in the district of Muri in the canton of Aargau in Switzerland.

== History ==
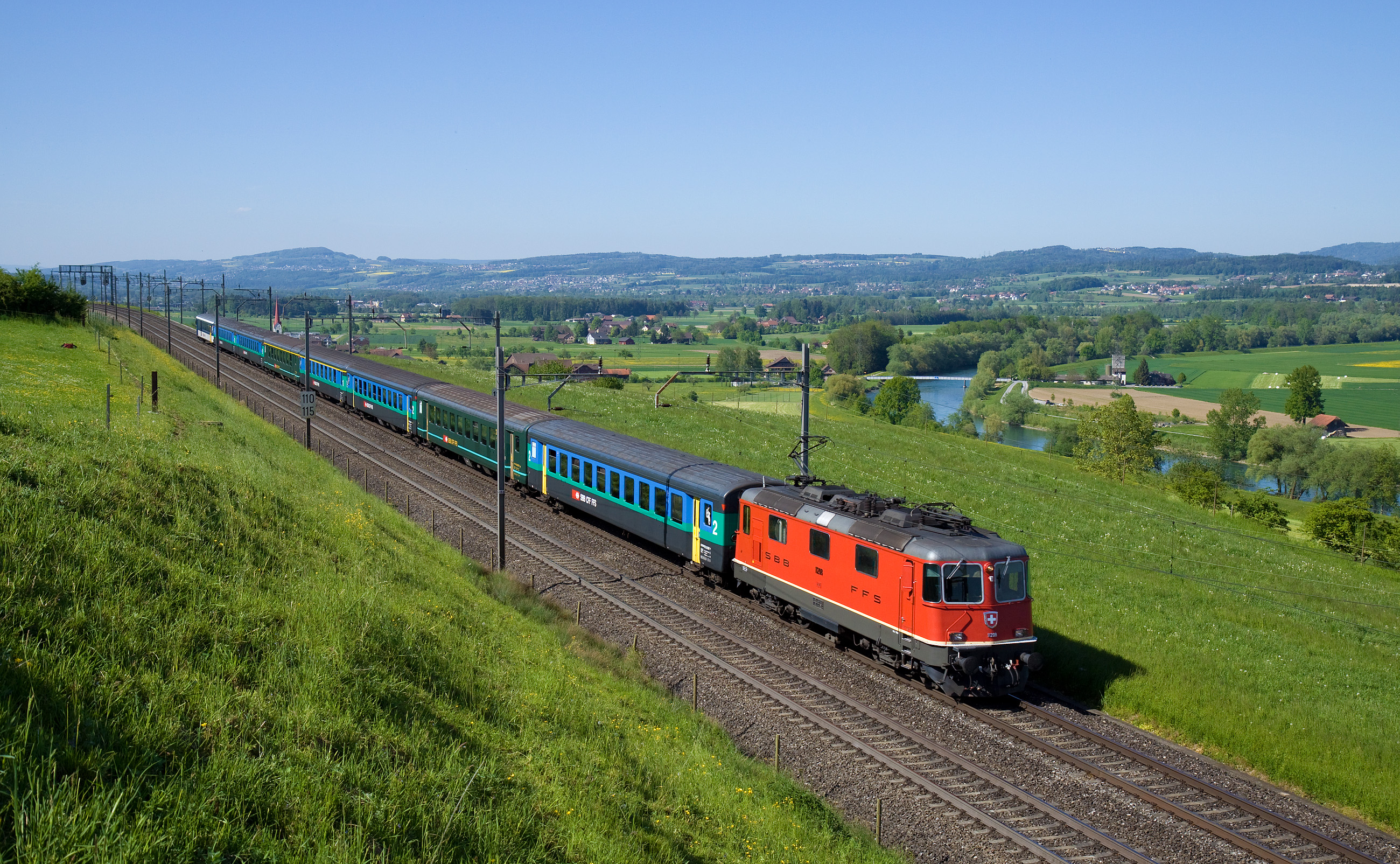
Rail line between Sins and Mühlau

Aerial view (1953)

The earliest evidence of human settlement in Mühlau is the remains of a Roman villa. The modern municipality of Mühlau is first mentioned in 1274 as Mulnowe. During the High and Late Middle Ages the major landholders in Mühlau were the Lords of Hünenberg, the Freie of Eschenbach and the Cistercian monastery at Eschenbach. From 1393/94 until 1803 it was part of the Merenschwand district. In 1810 the municipality of Mühlau was formed, containing the hamlet of Krähenbühl. In 1878 the hamlets of Schoren and Kestenberg left Merenschwand to join the municipality.

It was part of the parish of Sins, though the hamlets of Schoren and Kestenberg were part of the Merenschwand parish. In 1582, the St. Anna Chapel was consecrated. In 1852-53 the present parish church of St. Anna was constructed.

In 1881 the rail line from Muri to Rotkreuz was built through the village. Mühlau rail station was finished in 1885. In 1940 the Reuss river bridge replaced the ferry, which had been in service since 1393.

Mühlau is still a farming village. In 2005 agriculture provided almost a third of the jobs in the community.

== Geography ==
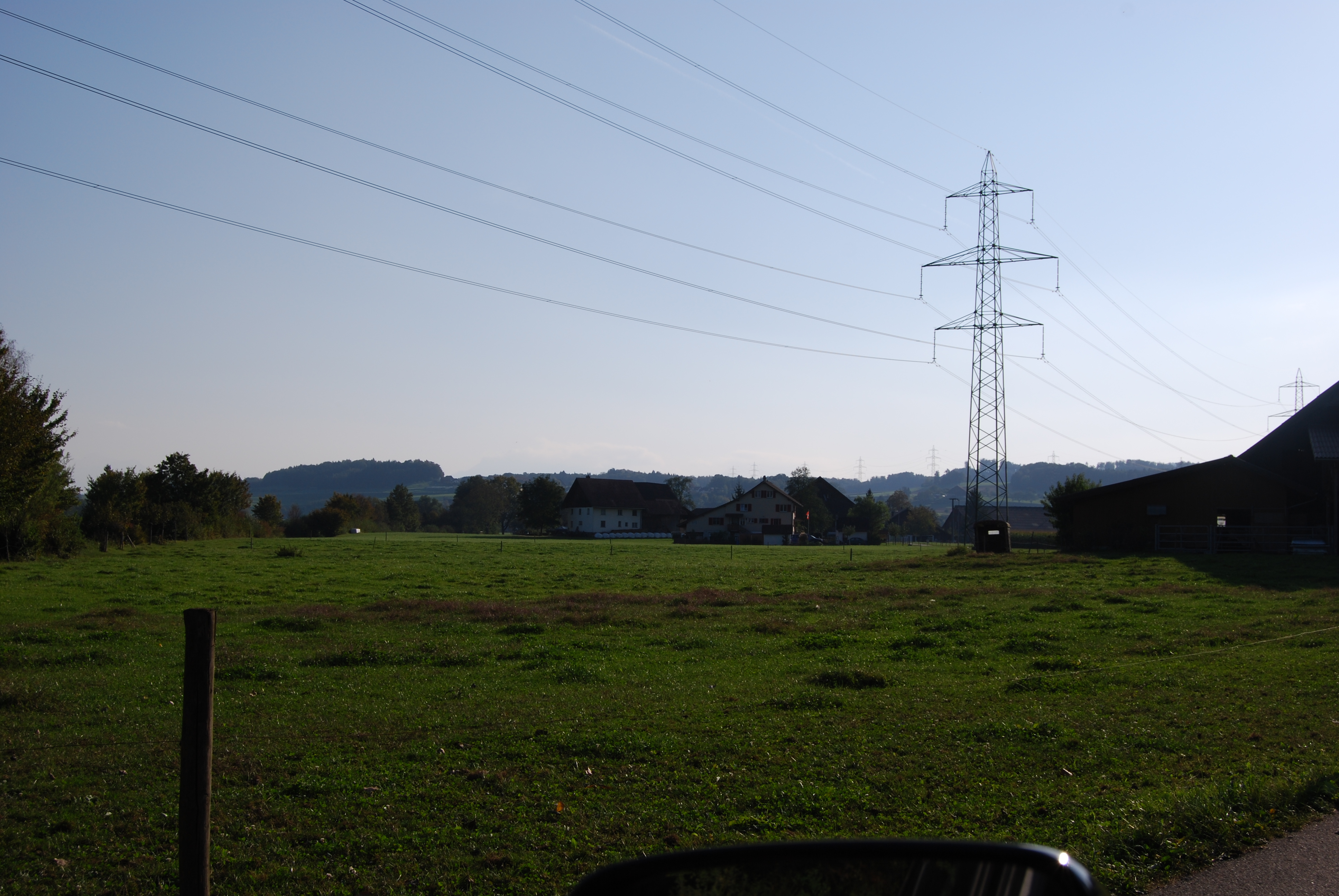
Schoren village in municipality Mühlau

Mühlau has an area, as of 2009, of 5.52 square kilometers (2.13 sq mi). Of this area, 3.86 km^{2} (1.49 sq mi) or 69.9% is used for agricultural purposes, while 0.73 km^{2} (0.28 sq mi) or 13.2% is forested. Of the rest of the land, 0.6 km^{2} (0.23 sq mi) or 10.9% is settled (buildings or roads), 0.17 km^{2} (0.066 sq mi) or 3.1% is either rivers or lakes and 0.15 km^{2} (37 acres) or 2.7% is unproductive land.

Of the built up area, housing and buildings made up 5.6% and transportation infrastructure made up 4.5%. Out of the forested land, all of the forested land area is covered with heavy forests. Of the agricultural land, 43.3% is used for growing crops and 25.5% is pastures, while 1.1% is used for orchards or vine crops. All the water in the municipality is in rivers and streams. Of the unproductive areas, 2.7% is unproductive vegetation.

The municipality is located in the Muri district, on a southern ridge of the Wagenrain above the Reuss. It consists of the linear village of Mühlau and the hamlets of Kestenberg, Schoren and Krähenbühl.

== Coat of arms ==
The blazon of the municipal coat of arms is Or a Base-Semi Mill-Wheel Sable and Coupeaux Vert.

== Demographics ==
Mühlau has a population (as of December 2020) of 1,218 As of June 2009, 9.6% of the population are foreign nationals. Over the last 10 years (1997–2007) the population has changed at a rate of 1.6%. Most of the population (as of 2000) speaks German(93.1%), with English being second most common ( 1.5%) and Albanian being third ( 1.5%).

The age distribution, as of 2008, in Mühlau is; 97 children or 9.8% of the population are between 0 and 9 years old and 146 teenagers or 14.7% are between 10 and 19. Of the adult population, 134 people or 13.5% of the population are between 20 and 29 years old. 130 people or 13.1% are between 30 and 39, 191 people or 19.3% are between 40 and 49, and 142 people or 14.3% are between 50 and 59. The senior population distribution is 67 people or 6.8% of the population are between 60 and 69 years old, 54 people or 5.4% are between 70 and 79, there are 26 people or 2.6% who are between 80 and 89, and there are 4 people or 0.4% who are 90 and older.

As of 2000 the average number of residents per living room was 0.59 which is about equal to the cantonal average of 0.57 per room. In this case, a room is defined as space of a housing unit of at least 4 m^{2} (43 sq ft) as normal bedrooms, dining rooms, living rooms, kitchens and habitable cellars and attics. About 55.2% of the total households were owner occupied, or in other words did not pay rent (though they may have a mortgage or a rent-to-own agreement).

As of 2000, there were 38 homes with 1 or 2 persons in the household, 153 homes with 3 or 4 persons in the household, and 164 homes with 5 or more persons in the household. As of 2000, there were 368 private households (homes and apartments) in the municipality, and an average of 2.6 persons per household. In 2008 there were 161 single family homes (or 39.0% of the total) out of a total of 413 homes and apartments. There were a total of 1 empty apartments for a 0.2% vacancy rate. As of 2007, the construction rate of new housing units was 8 new units per 1000 residents.

In the 2007 federal election the most popular party was the SVP which received 44.6% of the vote. The next three most popular parties were the CVP (24.5%), the FDP (10.2%) and the SP (9.5%).

The historical population is given in the following table:

Historical population
| Year | Pop. | ±% |
|---|---|---|
| 1850 | 347 | — |
| 1900 | 586 | +68.9% |
| 1950 | 580 | −1.0% |
| 1980 | 632 | +9.0% |
| 1990 | 815 | +29.0% |
| 2000 | 980 | +20.2% |

== Economy ==
As of 2007, Mühlau had an unemployment rate of 1.29%. As of 2005, there were 80 people employed in the primary economic sector and about 27 businesses involved in this sector. 81 people are employed in the secondary sector and there are 12 businesses in this sector. 87 people are employed in the tertiary sector, with 29 businesses in this sector.

In 2000 there were 513 workers who lived in the municipality. Of these, 382 or about 74.5% of the residents worked outside Mühlau while 67 people commuted into the municipality for work. There were a total of 198 jobs (of at least 6 hours per week) in the municipality. Of the working population, 9.5% used public transportation to get to work, and 57% used a private car.

== Religion ==
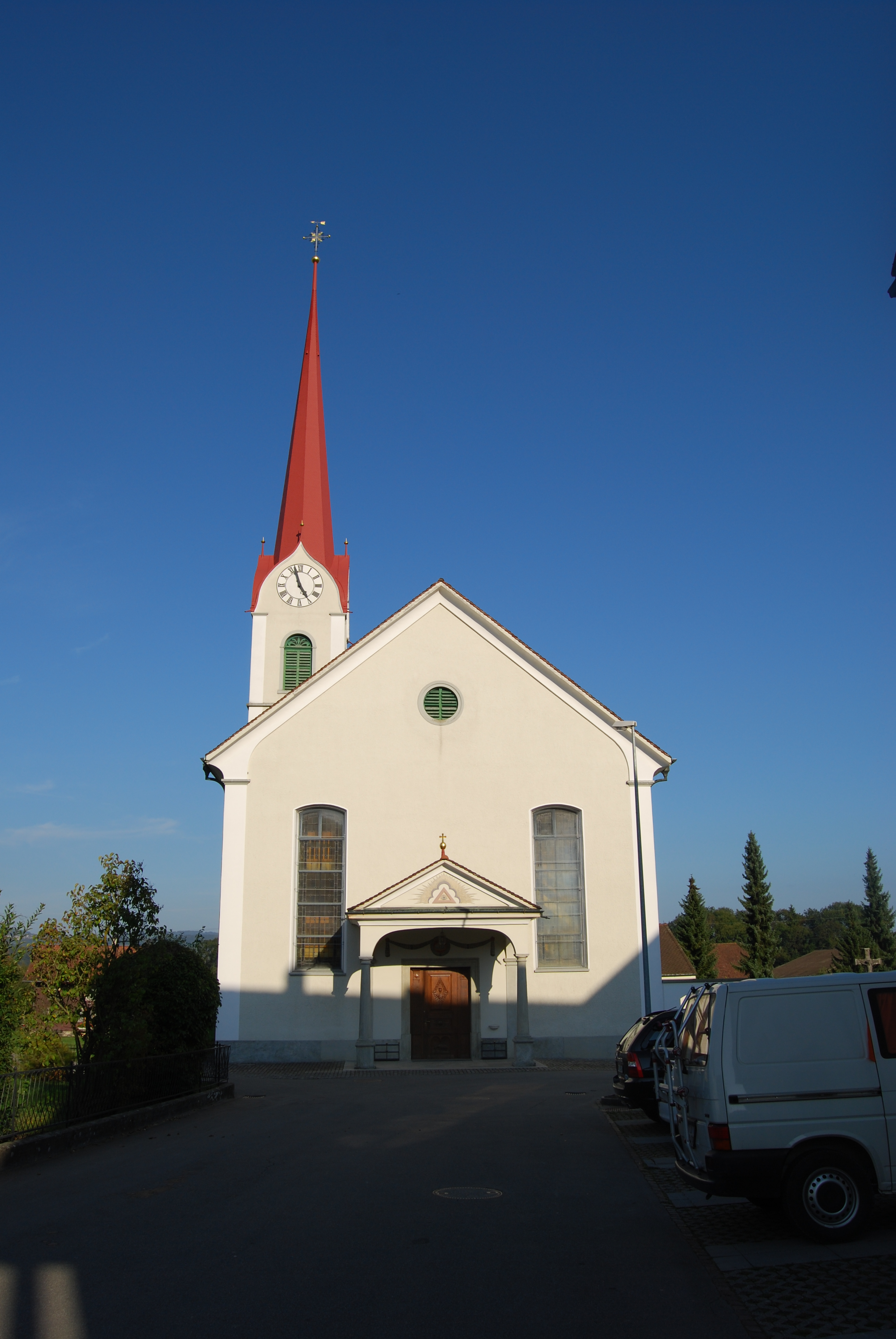
Mühlau church

From the 2000 census, 666 or 68.0% were Roman Catholic, while 165 or 16.8% belonged to the Swiss Reformed Church.

== Education ==
In Mühlau about 76.6% of the population (between age 25-64) have completed either non-mandatory upper secondary education or additional higher education (either university or a Fachhochschule). Of the school age population (in the 2008/2009 school year), there are 65 students attending primary school in the municipality. Mühlau is home to the Schul-u.Gde.Bibliothek Mühlau (school and municipal library of Mühlau). The library has (as of 2008) 4,500 books or other media, and loaned out 7,485 items in the same year. It was open a total of 36 days with average of 5 hours per week during that year.
