= Caspar Wolf =

Swiss painter

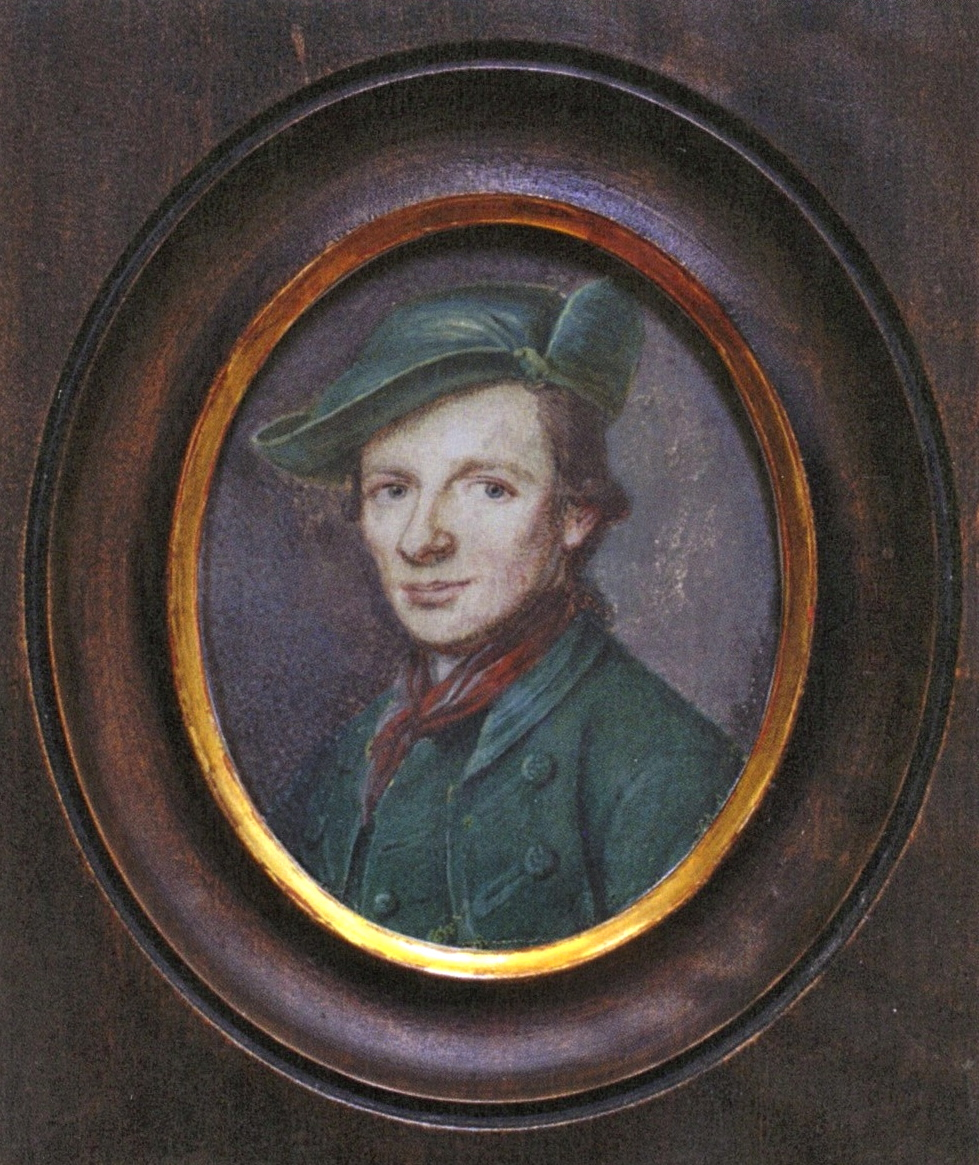
Self-portrait, 1774

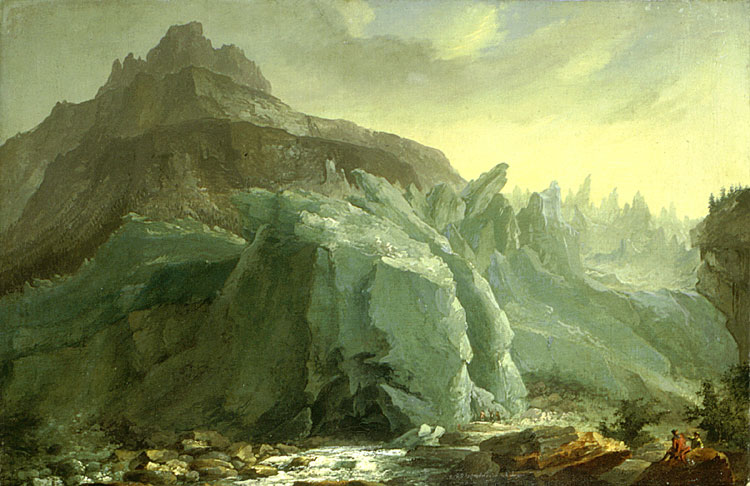
Lower Grindelwald glacier (1774–1777).

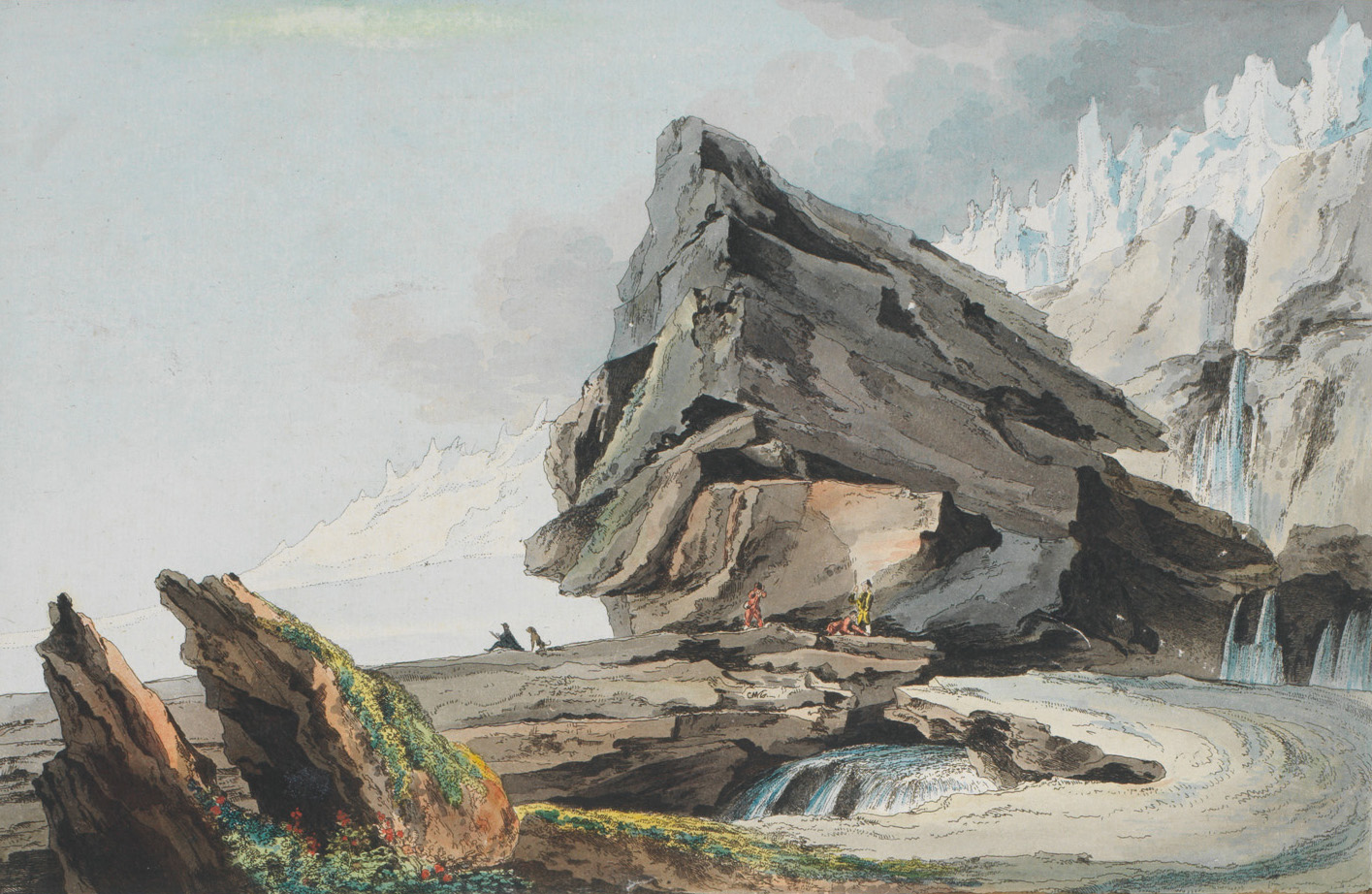
Glacier in Berner Oberland

Caspar Wolf (Muri, Aargau, 3 May 1735 – Heidelberg, 6 October 1783) was a Swiss painter, known mostly for his dramatic paintings of the Alps. He was strongly influenced by Albrecht von Haller's poems on the Alps, and the Sturm und Drang movement. After 1773 Wolf mostly painted glaciers, caves, waterfalls and gorges.

Wolf was the son of a furniture maker, who was banned from his city. Wolf was trained in Konstanz, between 1753 and 1759 he worked in Augsburg, Munich, Passau as a decoration painter. Not being able to sell his work he went disappointed back to his home town. For Horben Castle he painted by hand the wallpaper on the first floor. In 1768 Wolf lived in Basel. From 1769 till 1771 he stayed in Paris and worked with Philip James de Loutherbourg. In 1774 he moved to Bern. Wolf made a deal with the local publisher Abraham Wagner who had a geological interest, to deliver 200 paintings. He travelled with Wagner or a minister Jakob Samuel Wyttenbach in Berner Oberland and Wallis. From 1780-1781 he was working in Spa, Cologne, Aix-la-Chapelle and Düsseldorf. He died in poor circumstances in a hospital.

In 1779 his prints were exhibited in Bern but the book failed to sell. Wagner received help from a Swiss army officer in Dutch service and in 1785 thirty aquatints were published in Amsterdam. Till 1948 ninety of these aquatints were exhibited in Keukenhof Castle, but sold. Today these works can be seen in the Kunsthaus in Aarau.

His son Theodor Wolf (1770–1818) was a still life painter.
