= Merenschwand =

- Municipality
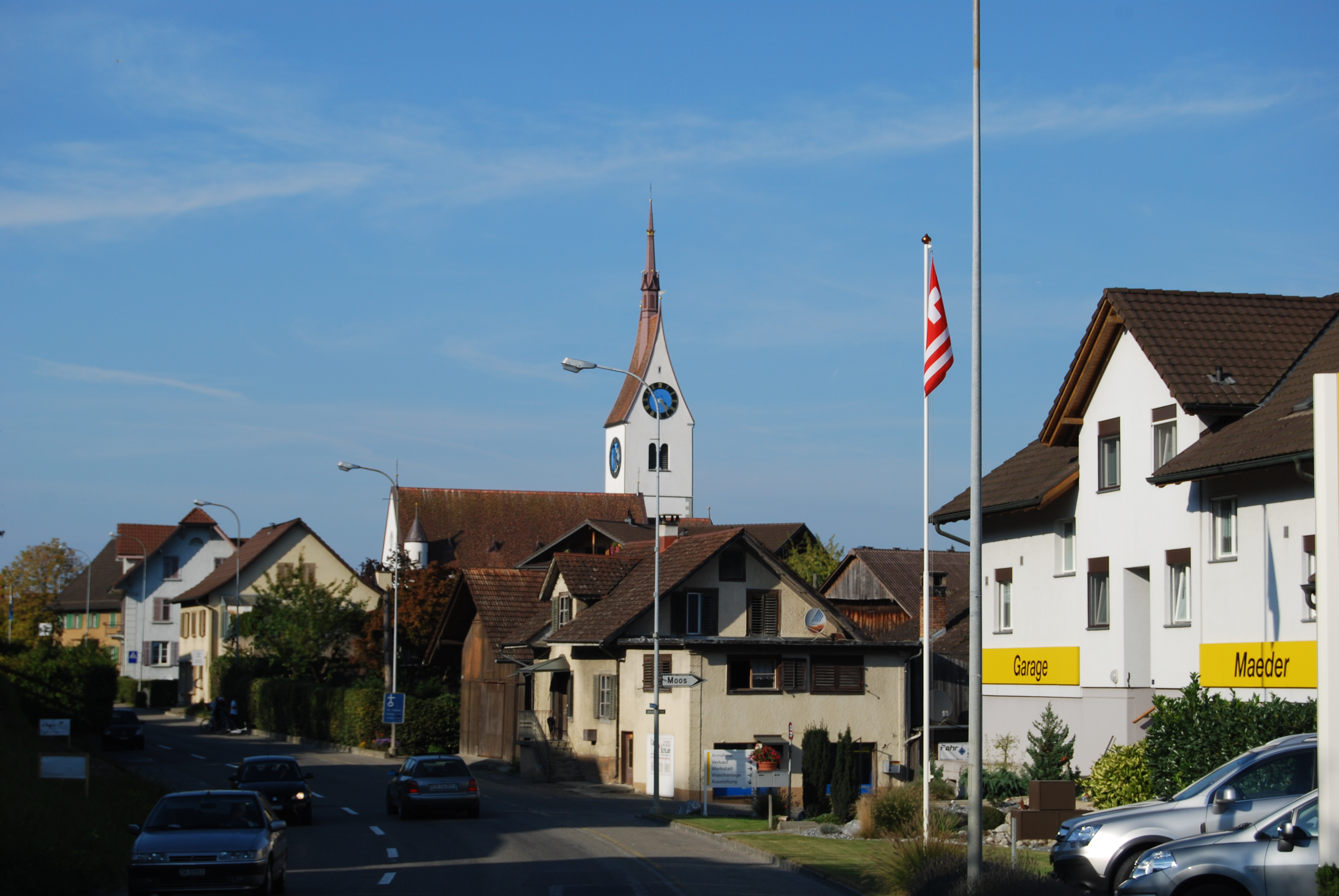

- Flag Coat of arms
- Location of Merenschwand
- Location within Switzerland Location within Canton of Aargau
- Coordinates: 47°16′N 8°23′E
- Country: Switzerland
- Canton: Aargau
- District: Muri

Area
  - Total: 13.51 km^{2} (5.22 sq mi)
- Elevation: 396 m (1,299 ft)

Population (December 2014)
  - Total: 3,406
  - Density: 252.1/km^{2} (653.0/sq mi)
- Time zone: UTC+01:00 (CET)
  - Summer (DST): UTC+02:00 (CEST)
- Postal code: 5634
- SFOS number: 4234
- ISO 3166 code: CH-AG
- Surrounded by: Aristau, Benzenschwil, Hünenberg (ZG), Mühlau, Muri, Obfelden (ZH), Ottenbach (ZH)
- Website: www.merenschwand.ch

Merenschwand is a municipality in the district of Muri in the canton of Aargau in Switzerland. The municipality of Benzenschwil merged on 1 January 2012 into Merenschwand.

== History ==
The earliest evidence of human settlement is a lake side village from the Late Bronze Age. The lake has since silted up and is now part of the Rütiweid meadow. The modern municipality of Merenschwand is first mentioned in the 12th Century as Meriswanden, though this comes from a 14th Century copy of the original. In 1263 it was mentioned as Meriswandon. There are indications of a knightly family and a castle near Merenschwand, but no definitive evidence has been found. Merenschwand was under the authority of the Homberg family until 1293, and then under the authority of the Lords of Hünenberg and Schär. In 1393 Merenschwand bought its independence with the help of a loan from Lucerne. As many of the former residents of the village had become citizens of Lucerne, in 1394 the village formally became part of the city of Lucerne and the residents were granted Lucerne citizenship. Merenschwand thus became the center of the bailiwick of Merenschwand. They chose their own vogt from among the patricians of Lucerne. In 1810 and 1813 the municipalities of Mühlau and Benzenschwil joined the bailiwick. Until 1798, the municipality enjoyed a relatively autonomous administration under a local bailiff. The gasthof (combination hotel and restaurant) Zum Schwanen (from the 17th century) served as a court and community center.

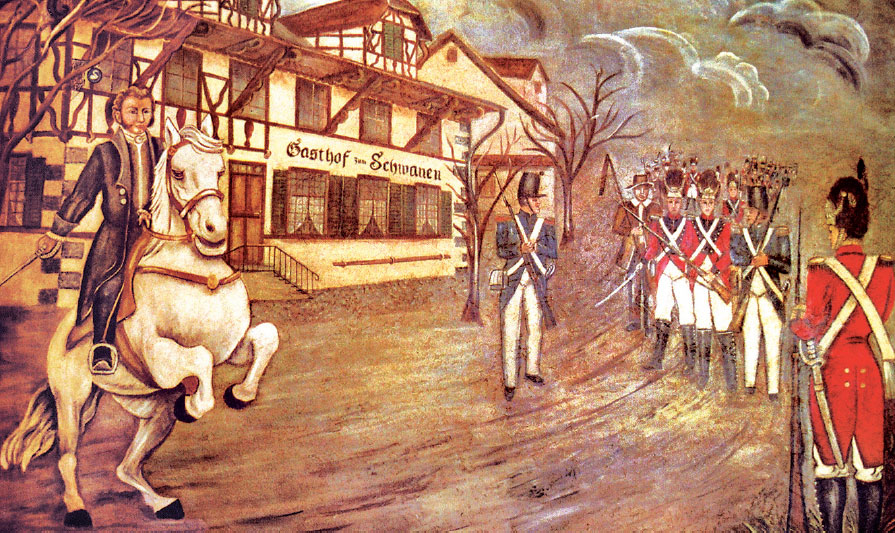
Freiämtersturm, Johann Heinrich Fischer assembles his men

The municipality was, in 1802, temporarily part of the Canton of Zug, and then in 1803 it became part of the Canton of Aargau. In 1830, the Zum Schwanen innkeeper, Johann Heinrich Fischer led some 6,000 men in the so-called Freiämtersturm to Aarau and forced the assembly to accept a new, democratic cantonal constitution.

Aerial view from 400 m by Walter Mittelholzer (1923)

The village church of St. Vitus is first mentioned in 1245. Initially it was a family church for the Homberg and later the Hünenberg families. It later became the parish church for the district. The modern church was built in 1897-99, and incorporated the late gothic choir. The municipality of Benzenschwil is still part of the parish while Mühlau now is part of the Sins parish. The church tax rights were sold in 1389 to Kappel Abbey in Kappel am Albis. In 1531 they went to the Hof monastery in Lucerne. Then, in 1856 those rights came to the Canton of Aargau.

The Hünenberg family donated the Marienkaplanei (St. Mary chapel) in 1332. The parish donated the Antoniuskaplanei (St. Anthony chapel) in 1483 and the landowners in Hagnau donated the local chapel of St. Wendelin in 1600. In 1868 the Kapelle Maria-Hilf (Chapel of Mary's Help) was built in Unterrüti.

In the 19th and 20th centuries, a major source of income in Merenschwand was the home straw plaiting for the Wohler trading houses and silk weaving for Zurich businessmen. In the last quarter of the 20th century, Merenschwand developed into a bedroom community for Zurich and Zug, leading to a corresponding increase in construction.

== Geography ==
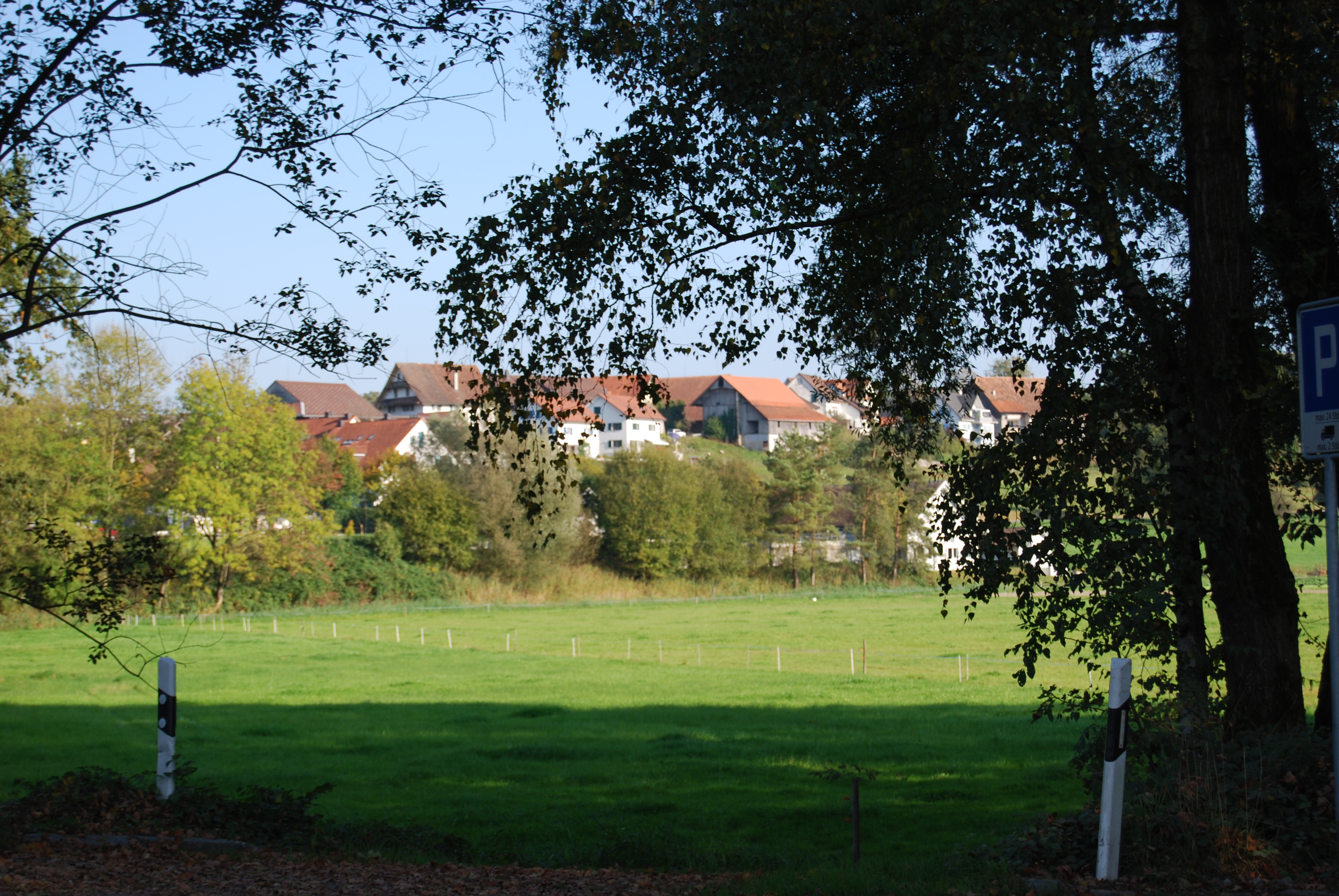
Hagnau village in Merenschwand municipality

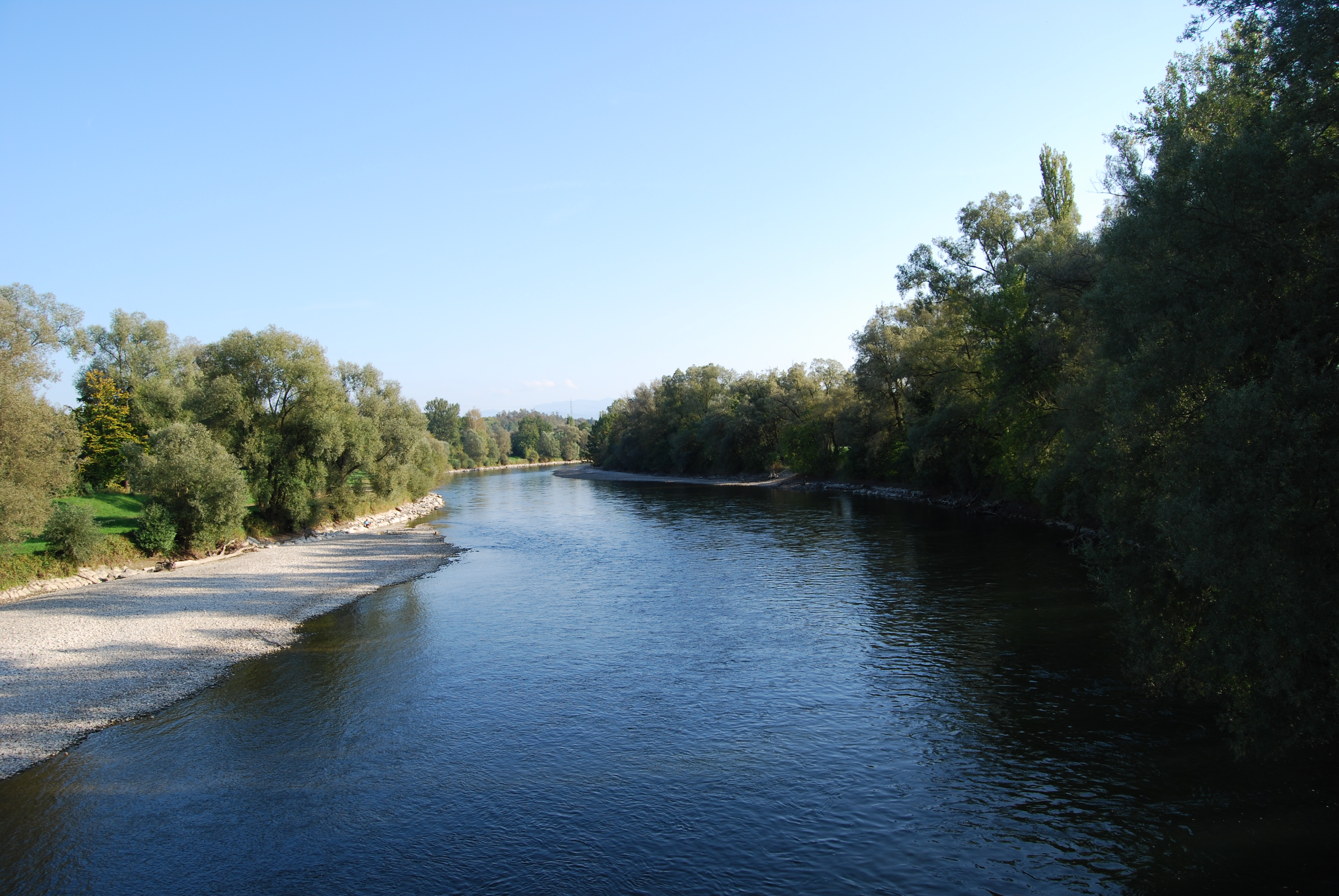
Reuss river in Rickenbach

Merenschwand has an area, as of 2009, of 11.05 square kilometers (4.27 sq mi). Of this area, 7.55 km^{2} (2.92 sq mi) or 68.3% is used for agricultural purposes, while 1.26 km^{2} (0.49 sq mi) or 11.4% is forested. Of the rest of the land, 1.25 km^{2} (0.48 sq mi) or 11.3% is settled (buildings or roads), 0.5 km^{2} (0.19 sq mi) or 4.5% is either rivers or lakes and 0.58 km^{2} (0.22 sq mi) or 5.2% is unproductive land. After the 2012 merger, Merenschwand had an area of 13.51 km^{2} (5.22 sq mi).

Of the built up area, industrial buildings made up 1.1% of the total area while housing and buildings made up 5.5% and transportation infrastructure made up 4.1%. Out of the forested land, 10.0% of the total land area is heavily forested and 1.4% is covered with orchards or small clusters of trees. Of the agricultural land, 57.7% is used for growing crops and 9.9% is pastures. All the water in the municipality is in rivers and streams. Of the unproductive areas, 5.1% is unproductive vegetation.

The municipality is located in the Muri district, on the edge of the Reuss valley. It consists of the haufendorf village (an irregular, unplanned and quite closely packed village, built around a central square) of Merenschwand and the hamlets of Unterrüti, Rickenbach and Hagnau.

The municipalities of Benzenschwil and Merenschwand are seeking approval from the Canton to merge on 1 January 2012 into a new municipality which will be known as Merenschwand.

== Coat of arms ==
The blazon of the municipal coat of arms is Azure a Swan proper standing of a Mount Vert and two Bulrush issuant. The swan (German: Schwan) makes it partly an example of canting.

== Demographics ==
Merenschwand has a population (as of December 2020) of 3,712. As of June 2009, 16.0% of the population are foreign nationals. Over the last 10 years (1997–2007) the population has changed at a rate of 27.8%. Most of the population (as of 2000) speaks German (90.4%), with Albanian being second most common ( 4.6%) and Serbo-Croatian being third ( 1.9%).

The age distribution, as of 2008, in Merenschwand is; 294 children or 11.9% of the population are between 0 and 9 years old and 396 teenagers or 16.0% are between 10 and 19. Of the adult population, 283 people or 11.4% of the population are between 20 and 29 years old. 332 people or 13.4% are between 30 and 39, 494 people or 19.9% are between 40 and 49, and 273 people or 11.0% are between 50 and 59. The senior population distribution is 226 people or 9.1% of the population are between 60 and 69 years old, 121 people or 4.9% are between 70 and 79, there are 59 people or 2.4% who are between 80 and 89, and there are 2 people or 0.1% who are 90 and older.

As of 2000 the average number of residents per living room was 0.58 which is about equal to the cantonal average of 0.57 per room. In this case, a room is defined as space of a housing unit of at least 4 m^{2} (43 sq ft) as normal bedrooms, dining rooms, living rooms, kitchens and habitable cellars and attics. About 56.3% of the total households were owner occupied, or in other words did not pay rent (though they may have a mortgage or a rent-to-own agreement).

As of 2000, there were 63 homes with 1 or 2 persons in the household, 271 homes with 3 or 4 persons in the household, and 425 homes with 5 or more persons in the household. As of 2000, there were 787 private households (homes and apartments) in the municipality, and an average of 2.7 persons per household. In 2008 there were 416 single family homes (or 44.2% of the total) out of a total of 941 homes and apartments. There were a total of 13 empty apartments for a 1.4% vacancy rate. As of 2007, the construction rate of new housing units was 2.4 new units per 1000 residents.

In the 2007 federal election the most popular party was the SVP which received 32.5% of the vote. The next three most popular parties were the CVP (31.7%), the SP (11.1%) and the FDP (10.4%).

The historical population is given in the following table:

Historical population
Year	Pop.	±%
1798	618	—
1850	1,212	+96.1%
1900	1,230	+1.5%
1950	1,196	−2.8%
1970	1,351	+13.0%
2000	2,171	+60.7%

== Heritage sites of national significance ==
The Gasthof (combination hotel and restaurant) Zum Schwanen at Bremgartenstrasse 2 and the Catholic parish church of Merenschwand are listed as Swiss heritage sites of national significance. The entire village of Merenschwand is designated as part of the Inventory of Swiss Heritage Sites.

== Economy ==
As of 2007, Merenschwand had an unemployment rate of 1.56%. As of 2005, there were 125 people employed in the primary economic sector and about 37 businesses involved in this sector. 624 people are employed in the secondary sector and there are 47 businesses in this sector. 280 people are employed in the tertiary sector, with 59 businesses in this sector.

In 2000 there were 1,134 workers who lived in the municipality. Of these, 775 or about 68.3% of the residents worked outside Merenschwand while 481 people commuted into the municipality for work. There were a total of 840 jobs (of at least 6 hours per week) in the municipality. Of the working population, 11.5% used public transportation to get to work, and 54.5% used a private car.

== Religion ==
From the 2000 census, 1,342 or 61.8% were Roman Catholic, while 416 or 19.2% belonged to the Swiss Reformed Church.

== Education ==
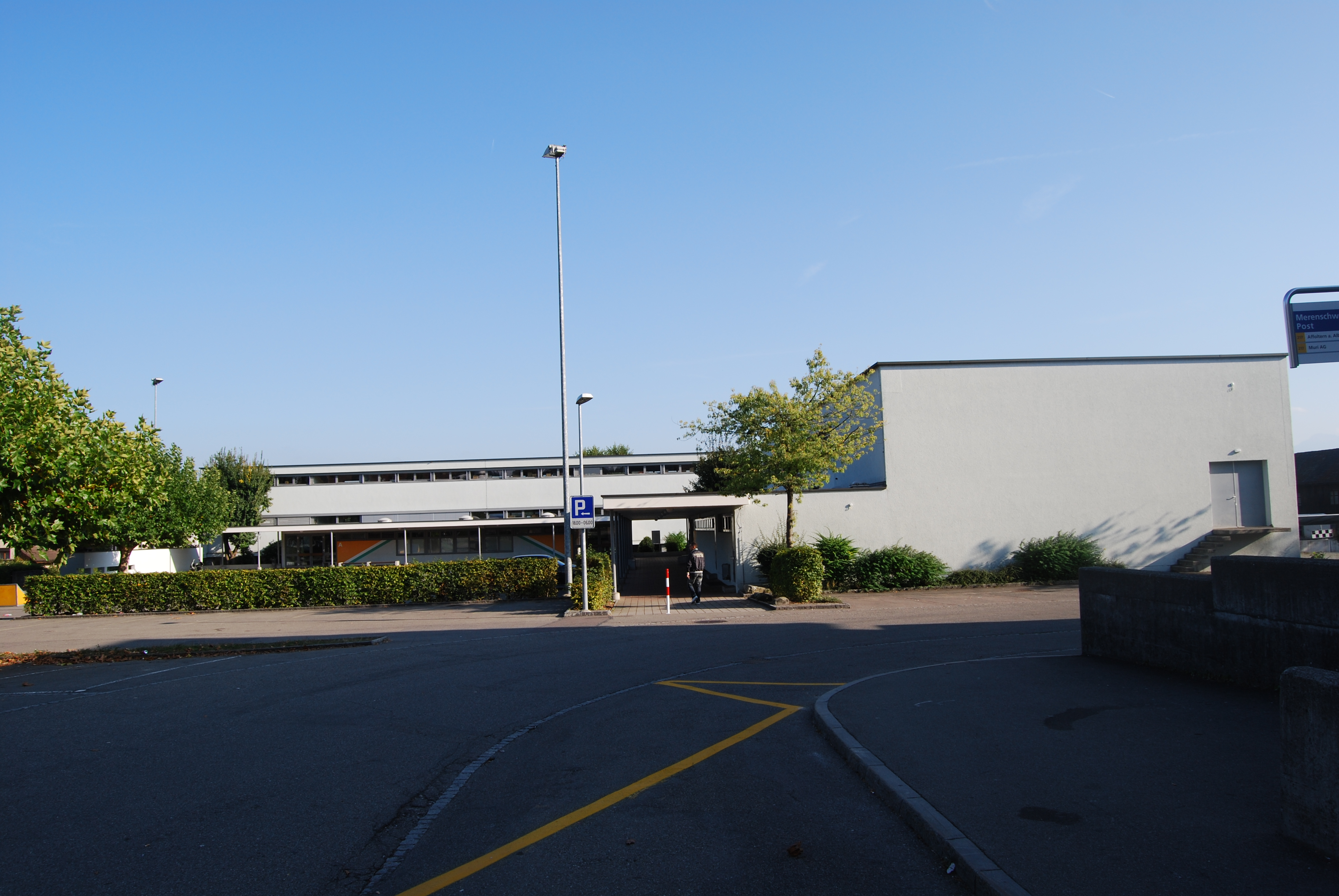
Merenschwand school

In Merenschwand about 76.5% of the population (between age 25-64) have completed either non-mandatory upper secondary education or additional higher education (either university or a Fachhochschule). Of the school age population (in the 2008/2009 school year), there are 263 students attending primary school, there are 219 students attending secondary school in the municipality. Merenschwand is home to the Schul-u.Gde.Bibliothek Merenschwand (school and municipal library of Merenschwand).
