= Conrad of Mure =

Swiss writer

Conrad of Mure, also often referred to as Conrad of Muri (c. 1210 – 30 March 1281), was rector of the diocesan school attached to the Zurich Minster and author of a number of important treatises on rhetoric and poetry. His Summa de arte prosandi (1275–1276) is one of the most learned introductions to the art of letter writing in the Middle Ages. He wrote the Fabularius, the first western encyclopedia in alphabetical order.

== Edition ==
- Kronbichler, Walter, ed. (1968). Die Summa de arte prosandi des Konrad von Mure. Geist und Werk der Zeiten. Vol. 17. Zürich: Fretz & Wasmuth.
