= Buttwil =

- Municipality
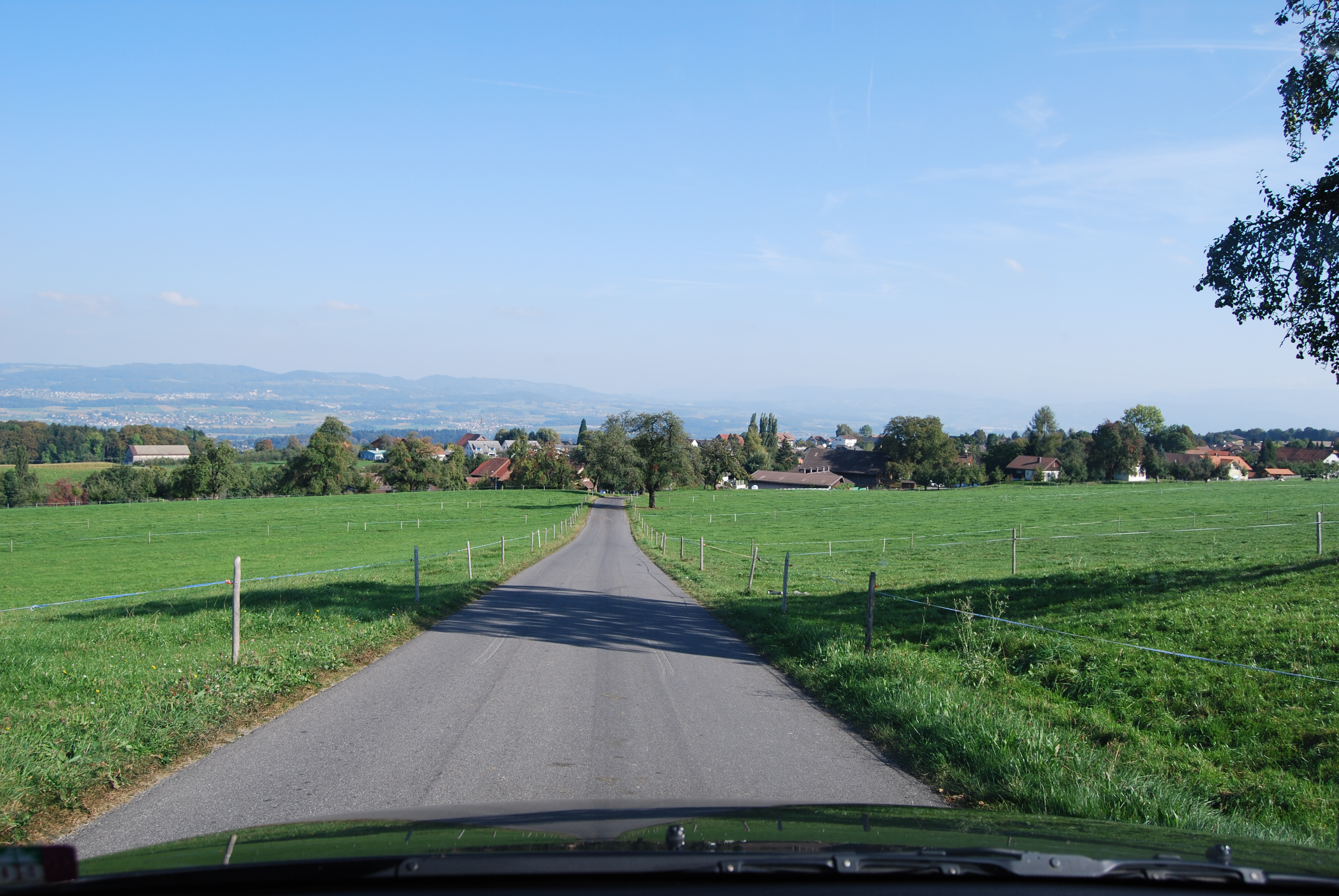

- Flag Coat of arms
- Location of Buttwil
- Location within Switzerland Location within Canton of Aargau
- Coordinates: 47°16′N 8°19′E
- Country: Switzerland
- Canton: Aargau
- District: Muri

Area
  - Total: 4.52 km^{2} (1.75 sq mi)
- Elevation: 641 m (2,103 ft)

Population (December 2020)
  - Total: 1,234
  - Density: 273/km^{2} (707/sq mi)
- Time zone: UTC+01:00 (CET)
  - Summer (DST): UTC+02:00 (CEST)
- Postal code: 5632
- SFOS number: 4230
- ISO 3166 code: CH-AG
- Surrounded by: Bettwil, Boswil, Geltwil, Hämikon (LU), Muri, Müswangen (LU), Schongau (LU)
- Website: www.buttwil.ch

Buttwil is a municipality in the district of Muri in the canton of Aargau in Switzerland.

The village is 2 kilometers (1.2 mi) west of Muri.

== History ==
Buttwil is first mentioned in 1160 as Butwile. From its founding the Benedictine Muri Abbey possessed extensive real estate in the village. With the conquest of Aargau in 1415, the high court right, which had been held by the Habsburgs, went to the Swiss Confederation. The low court right remained at the Abbey.

The chapel of St. James was built in 1666 and was a chapel of ease in the Muri parish.

This former farming village showed a steady population decline around 1950. This was followed by a sharp increase since 1970, due to the virtually fog-free area and the short commutes on the train to Zürich and Lucerne. Since 1984, there has been a bus connection to Muri.

== Geography ==
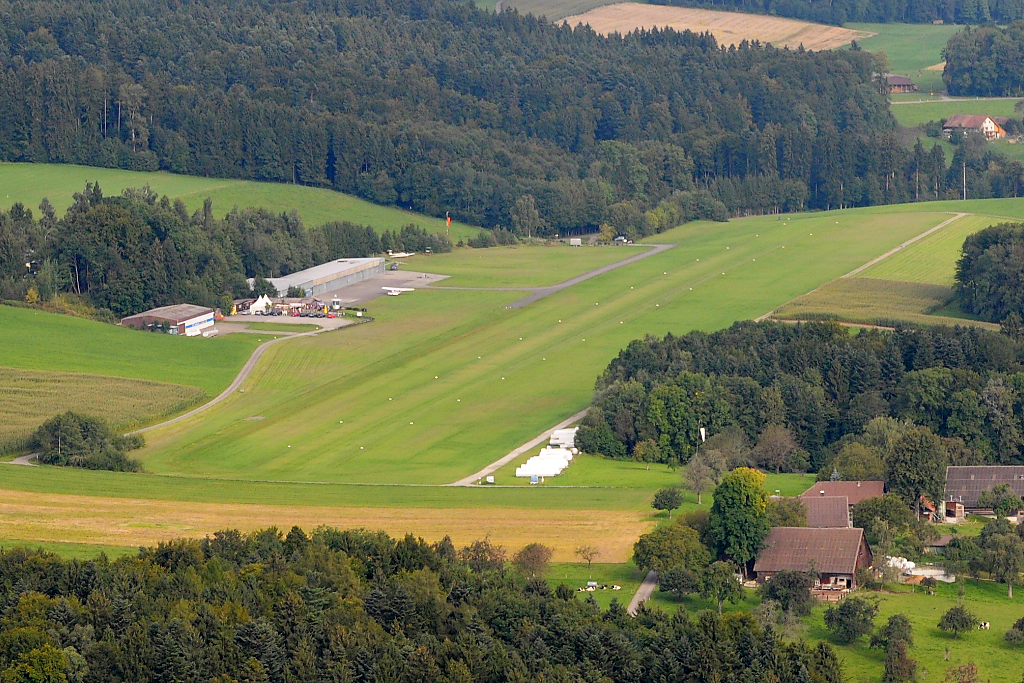
Buttwil Airfield

Aerial view (1953)

Buttwil has an area, as of 2009, of 4.52 square kilometers (1.75 sq mi). Of this area, 2.92 km^{2} (1.13 sq mi) or 64.6% is used for agricultural purposes, while 1.03 km^{2} (0.40 sq mi) or 22.8% is forested. Of the rest of the land, 0.56 km^{2} (0.22 sq mi) or 12.4% is settled (buildings or roads).

Of the built up area, housing and buildings made up 6.2% and transportation infrastructure made up 5.5%. Out of the forested land, 21.2% of the total land area is heavily forested and 1.5% is covered with orchards or small clusters of trees. Of the agricultural land, 38.7% is used for growing crops and 22.6% is pastures, while 3.3% is used for orchards or vine crops.

The municipality is located in the Muri district on the eastern edge of the Lindenberg. It consists of the village of Buttwil.

== Coat of arms ==
The blazon of the municipal coat of arms is Gules an Escallop Argent.

== Demographics ==
Buttwil has a population (as of December 2020) of 1,234 As of June 2009, 5.5% of the population are foreign nationals. Over the last 10 years (1997–2007) the population has changed at a rate of 5.9%. Most of the population (as of 2000) speaks German (95.6%), with French being second most common ( 0.7%) and Italian being third ( 0.6%).

The age distribution, as of 2008, in Buttwil is; 138 children or 11.8% of the population are between 0 and 9 years old and 188 teenagers or 16.0% are between 10 and 19. Of the adult population, 108 people or 9.2% of the population are between 20 and 29 years old. 145 people or 12.4% are between 30 and 39, 229 people or 19.5% are between 40 and 49, and 171 people or 14.6% are between 50 and 59. The senior population distribution is 121 people or 10.3% of the population are between 60 and 69 years old, 50 people or 4.3% are between 70 and 79, there are 20 people or 1.7% who are between 80 and 89, and there are 2 people or 0.2% who are 90 and older.

As of 2000 the average number of residents per living room was 0.58 which is about equal to the cantonal average of 0.57 per room. In this case, a room is defined as space of a housing unit of at least 4 m^{2} (43 sq ft) as normal bedrooms, dining rooms, living rooms, kitchens and habitable cellars and attics. About 73.5% of the total households were owner occupied, or in other words did not pay rent (though they may have a mortgage or a rent-to-own agreement).

As of 2000, there were 22 homes with 1 or 2 persons in the household, 125 homes with 3 or 4 persons in the household, and 231 homes with 5 or more persons in the household. As of 2000, there were 391 private households (homes and apartments) in the municipality, and an average of 2.8 persons per household. In 2008 there were 268 single family homes (or 56.9% of the total) out of a total of 471 homes and apartments. There were a total of 0 empty apartments for a 0.0% vacancy rate. As of 2007, the construction rate of new housing units was 8.6 new units per 1000 residents.

In the 2007 federal election the most popular party was the SVP which received 36.6% of the vote. The next three most popular parties were the CVP (21.8%), the SP (13.6%) and the FDP (9.7%).

The historical population is given in the following table:

Historical population
Year	Pop.	±%
1850	551	—
1900	375	−31.9%
1950	342	−8.8%
1970	344	+0.6%
1980	593	+72.4%
1990	877	+47.9%
2000	1,105	+26.0%

== Economy ==
As of 2007, Buttwil had an unemployment rate of 1.39%. As of 2005, there were 39 people employed in the primary economic sector and about 14 businesses involved in this sector. 47 people are employed in the secondary sector and there are 14 businesses in this sector. 119 people are employed in the tertiary sector, with 31 businesses in this sector.

In 2000 there were 574 workers who lived in the municipality. Of these, 456 or about 79.4% of the residents worked outside Buttwil while 86 people commuted into the municipality for work. There were a total of 204 jobs (of at least 6 hours per week) in the municipality. Of the working population, 8.3% used public transportation to get to work, and 61.4% used a private car.

== Religion ==
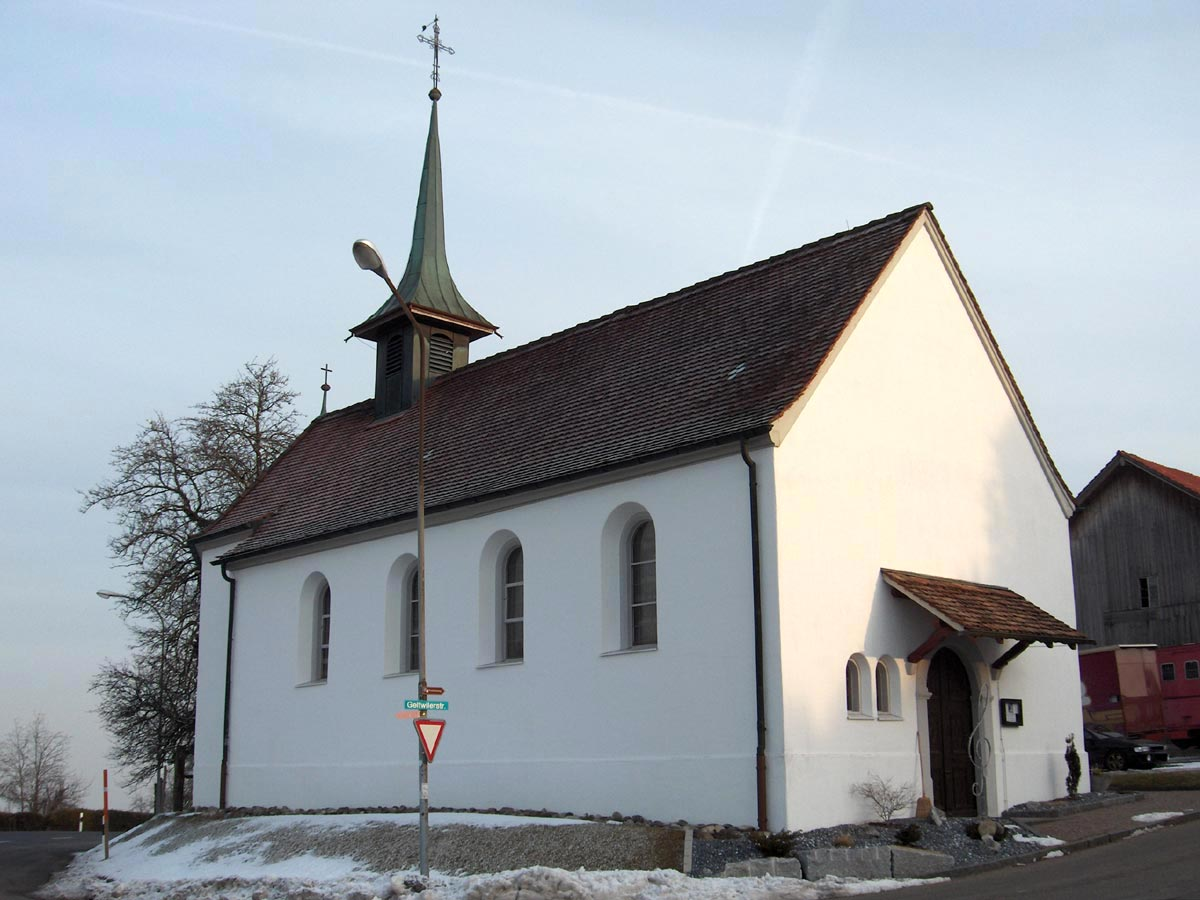
Church of Buttwil

From the 2000 census, 618 or 55.9% were Roman Catholic, while 332 or 30.0% belonged to the Swiss Reformed Church. Of the rest of the population, there was 1 individual who belonged to the Christian Catholic faith.

== Education ==
In Buttwil about 82% of the population (between age 25-64) have completed either non-mandatory upper secondary education or additional higher education (either University or a Fachhochschule). Of the school age population (in the 2008/2009 school year), there are 128 students attending primary school in the municipality.
