= Muri District =

Coordinates: 47°16′N 8°20′E

Muri District Bezirk Muri
- District
- Country: Switzerland
- Canton: Aargau
- Capital: Muri

Area
  - Total: 138.96 km^{2} (53.65 sq mi)

Population (2020)
  - Total: 37,379
  - Density: 268.99/km^{2} (696.68/sq mi)
- Time zone: UTC+1 (CET)
  - Summer (DST): UTC+2 (CEST)
- Municipalities: 19

Muri District is a district in the Swiss Canton of Aargau with the administrative capital of Muri. It covers the central and southern part of Freiamt and has a population of 37,379 (as of 31 December 2020).

== Geography ==
The Muri district has an area, as of 2009, of 138.96 square kilometers (53.65 sq mi). Of this area, 95.6 km^{2} (36.9 sq mi) or 68.8% is used for agricultural purposes, while 26.76 km^{2} (10.33 sq mi) or 19.3% is forested. Of the rest of the land, 13.62 km^{2} (5.26 sq mi) or 9.8% is settled (buildings or roads).

== Coat of arms ==
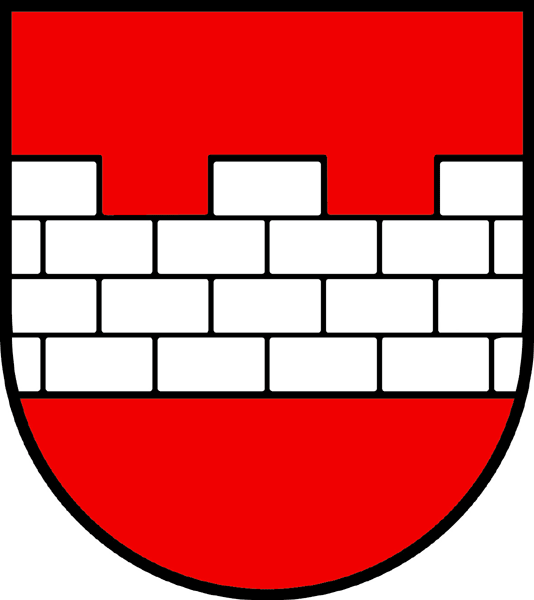

The blazon of the district coat of arms is Gules a Wall in fess embattled Argent masoned Sable..

== Demographics ==
The Muri district has a population (as of December 2020) of 37,379. As of June 2009, 13.2% of the population are foreign nationals.

== Economy ==
In 2000 there were 15,053 workers who lived in the district. Of these, 10,391 or about 69.0% of the residents worked outside the Muri district while 4,675 people commuted into the district for work. There were a total of 9,337 jobs (of at least 6 hours per week) in the district.

== Religion ==
From the 2000 census, 18,897 or 66.9% were Roman Catholic, while 4,960 or 17.6% belonged to the Swiss Reformed Church. Of the rest of the population, there were 18 individuals (or about 0.06% of the population) who belonged to the Christian Catholic faith.

== Education ==
Of the school age population (in the 2008/2009 school year), there are 2,724 students attending primary school, there are 935 students attending secondary school, there are 569 students attending tertiary or university level schooling, and there are 14 students who are seeking a job after school in the municipality.

== Municipalities ==
Population

Coat of arms	Municipality	Population (31 December 2020)	Area, km^{2}
Abtwil	Abtwil	954	4.14
Aristau	Aristau	1,512	8.64
Auw	Auw	2,203	8.61
Beinwil	Beinwil	1,183	11.29
Besenbüren	Besenbüren	632	2.38
Bettwil	Bettwil	654	4.25
Boswil	Boswil	2,923	11.78
Bünzen	Bünzen	1,128	5.77
Buttwil	Buttwil	1,234	4.61
Dietwil	Dietwil	1,355	5.49
Geltwil	Geltwil	221	3.28
Kallern	Kallern	399	2.67
Merenschwand	Merenschwand	3,712	13.51
Mühlau	Mühlau	1,218	5.52
Muri	Muri	8,244	12.34
Oberrüti	Oberrüti	1,544	5.37
Rottenschwil	Rottenschwil	911	4.49
Sins	Sins	4,299	20.28
Waltenschwil	Waltenschwil	3,053	4.54
Total		37,379	138.96

=== Mergers ===
The following changes to the district's municipalities have occurred since 2000:

- On 1 January 2012 the municipality of Benzenschwil merged into Merenschwand.
