= Muri, Aargau =

Municipality in Switzerland

Muri
- Municipality
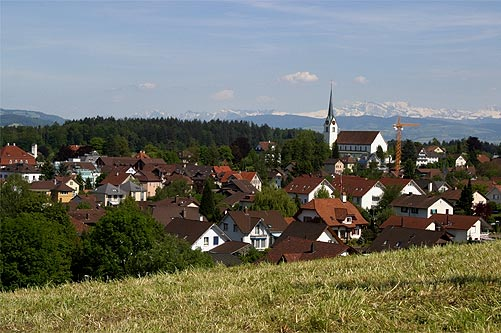

- Flag Coat of arms
- Location of Muri
- Location within Switzerland Location within Canton of Aargau
- Coordinates: 47°17′N 8°21′E
- Country: Switzerland
- Canton: Aargau
- District: Muri

Area
  - Total: 12.34 km^{2} (4.76 sq mi)
- Elevation: 460 m (1,510 ft)

Population (December 2006)
  - Total: 6,605
  - Density: 535.3/km^{2} (1,386/sq mi)
- Time zone: UTC+01:00 (CET)
  - Summer (DST): UTC+02:00 (CEST)
- Postal code: 5630
- SFOS number: 4236
- ISO 3166 code: CH-AG
- Surrounded by: Aristau, Benzenschwil, Boswil, Buttwil, Geltwil, Merenschwand
- Website: www.muri.ch

Muri, formerly known as Muri (Freiamt), is a municipality in southeastern Swiss Canton Aargau and is the capital of same district. The present municipality of Muri was created in 1816 from the merging of the four municipalities Langdorf, Egg, Hasli and Wey.

== Geography ==
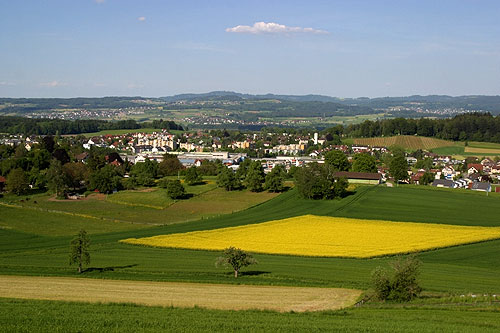
View of Muri-Langdorf, with Albis and Üetliberg in the background

The community consists of three districts. Immediately west of the monastery lies the community of Wey, slightly more than a kilometer south of the district Langdorf (formerly known as Dorfmuri). East of the railway line, at a distance of half a kilometer of the village is Egg. There are also several hamlets: Hasli is located one kilometer north of the monastery, Vili one kilometer in a northwesterly direction, and Langenmatt one kilometer to the west. Türmelen, a hamlet, which lies directly on the eastern boundary of the municipality, is now merged with Egg. There are also numerous isolated farms scattered throughout the area.

Muri is located in the upper end of the Bünztal at the foot of Lindenberg, Covering all districts, with one exception lie in a plane at an altitude from 450 to 480 meters (1,480 to 1,570 ft). In the west the slope rises evenly, where Langenmatt lies at an altitude of 570 meters (1,870 ft). Toward the south, the terrain is undulating and is divided by two river valleys. The Sörikerbach flows through Wey, and the Rüeribach by Langdorf and Egg.

Muri has an area, as of 2009, of 12.34 square kilometers (4.76 sq mi). Of this area, 7.17 km^{2} (2.77 sq mi) or 58.1% is used for agricultural purposes, while 2.57 km^{2} (0.99 sq mi) or 20.8% is forested. Of the rest of the land, 2.49 km^{2} (0.96 sq mi) or 20.2% is settled (buildings or roads), 0.04 km^{2} (9.9 acres) or 0.3% is either rivers or lakes and 0.03 km^{2} (7.4 acres) or 0.2% is unproductive land.

Of the built up area, industrial buildings made up 2.6% of the total area while housing and buildings made up 11.3% and transportation infrastructure made up 4.4%. while parks, green belts and sports fields made up 1.3%. Out of the forested land, 19.5% of the total land area is heavily forested and 1.3% is covered with orchards or small clusters of trees. Of the agricultural land, 39.5% is used for growing crops and 16.1% is pastures, while 2.4% is used for orchards or vine crops. All the water in the municipality is in rivers and streams.

The highest point is located at 635 meters (2,083 ft) above the ravine on Sörikerbach, the lowest point lies at 432 meters (1,417 ft) in Büelmoos on the eastern boundary of the municipality.

The neighboring communities are Aristau in the Northeast, Merenschwand in the east, Benzenschwil in the southeast, Geltwil in the southwest, Buttwil in the west and Boswil in the northwest.

== History ==
Several findings suggest that colonisation of the area happened during the Neolithic and Bronze Ages. Close to Hallstatt Era is one Mound, which was discovered in 1929 near the southern boundary of the municipality. From the 1st century AD, smaller Roman settlements existed, but these were destroyed by the Alamanni by 260. This allowed them to settle here in the 8th or 9th century, calling their settlement Murah, from the Latin murus after the many Roman low walls they found. It was first mentioned in 924 as Murahe.

The history is closely linked to that of the Benedictines of Muri. Radbot, Count of Habsburg and Ida of Lorraine founded Muri Abbey in 1027. With the backing of the Habsburgs, it became more powerful over time, and acquired an extensive estate in the Swiss Plateau before rising to become an important spiritual and cultural center. In the 12th century, today's municipality was split into the vicus superior and the vicus inferior, which included the monastery domain. From parts of that domain arose around 1082 the other settlements and isolated farms. Egg, Hasli, and Wey evolved over time into independent communities.

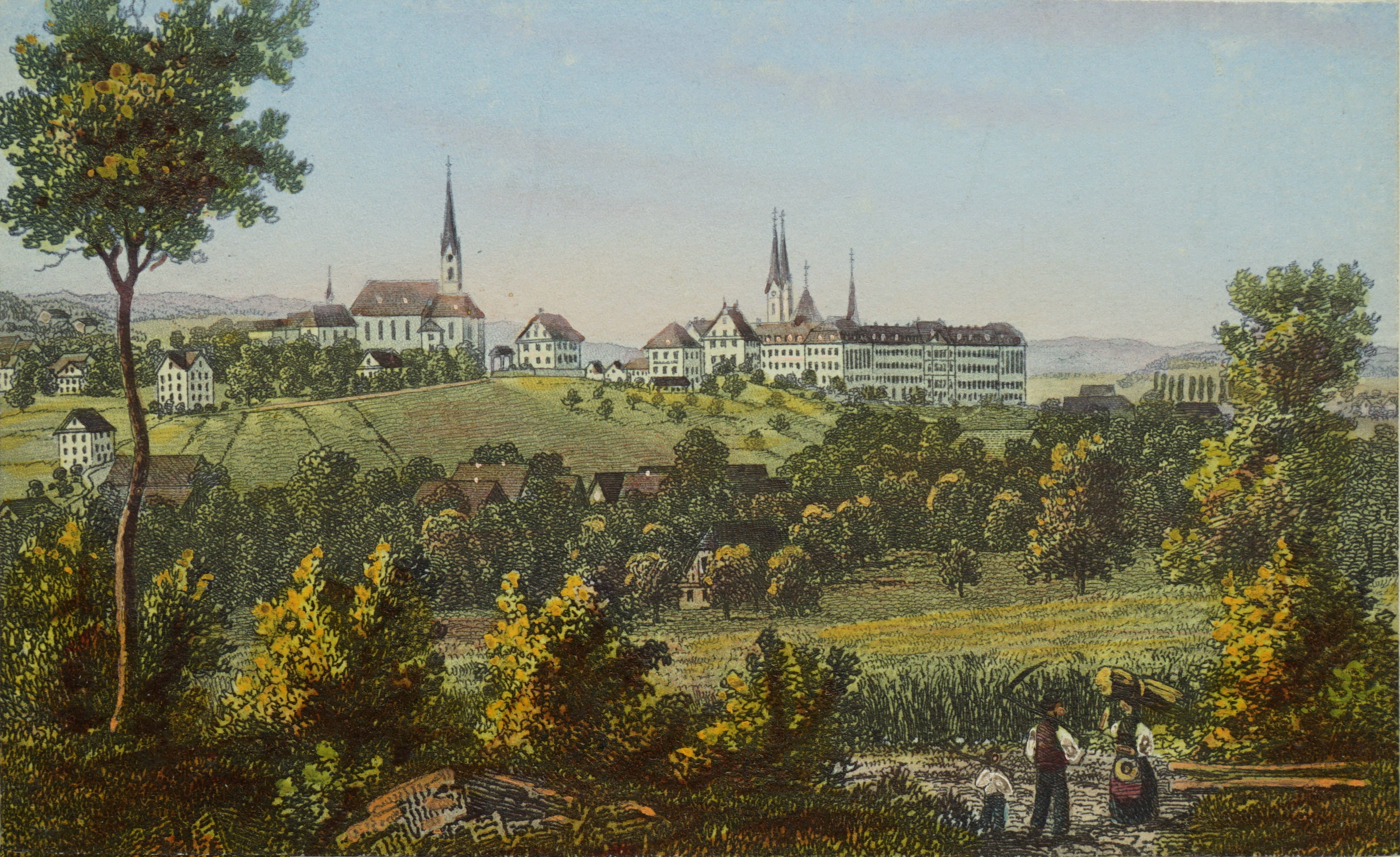
Muri c. 1870. Etching by Heinrich Müller

The parish included not only the present day Muri, but also Aristau, Buttwil and Geltwil. The monastery also encompassed parts of Beinwil and Besenbüren. The provincial government and the right of high justice were held by the counts of Habsburg. A large minority of the population of Muri became Protestants in 1529, but were re-Catholicised after the Second War of Kappel (1531). The monastery became increasingly important after 1701, and was for many years the wealthiest in Switzerland.

Religious riots broke out in early January 1841 in the Freiamt, directed against the state government. The conflict, which was brought under control within a few days, served the district as an excuse on 13 January to decide that the monastery of Muri would be stripped of its power; the last monks left the monastery on 27 January. This hit the town by surprise, since they now had to take on tasks which had previously been settled by the monastery, such as education. The buildings were subsequently put to a variety of purposes.

Aerial view by Walter Mittelholzer (1923)

In March 1798, Napoleon I abolished the Old Swiss Confederacy and proclaimed the Helvetic Republic. Muri was the administrative seat of a district of the canton of Baden. The current municipality of Muri was created in 1816 after the dissolution of the district municipality and the merger of Egg, Hasli, Langdorf, and Wey; the community of Hasli had meanwhile been driven to bankruptcy. On 21 August 1889, part of the monastery burned down, and the complete restoration of the east wing was completed only in 1989. Since 1960, a small group of monks have been living in a wing of the monastery. The remaining rooms now belong to the county and municipality, as well as some classrooms.

On 1 June 1875, the town became connected to the railway network when the Wohlen–Muri section of the Aargau Southern Railway was opened. The continuation after Rotkreuz (with connection to the Gotthardbahn) was delayed for financial reasons and only took place on 1 December 1881. For a while there was much tourism because from 1868 to 1917 there was a spa and bathhouse.

== Heritage sites of national significance ==
The former Benedictine Muri Abbey, the Leontiusbrunnen (fountain) at Leontiusplatz, the so-called Klosterscheune near the Abbey at Klosterhof 197 and the granary at Hasli 233 are all listed as Swiss heritage sites of national significance. The entire hamlet of Hasli is designated as part of the Inventory of Swiss Heritage Sites.

=== Muri Abbey ===
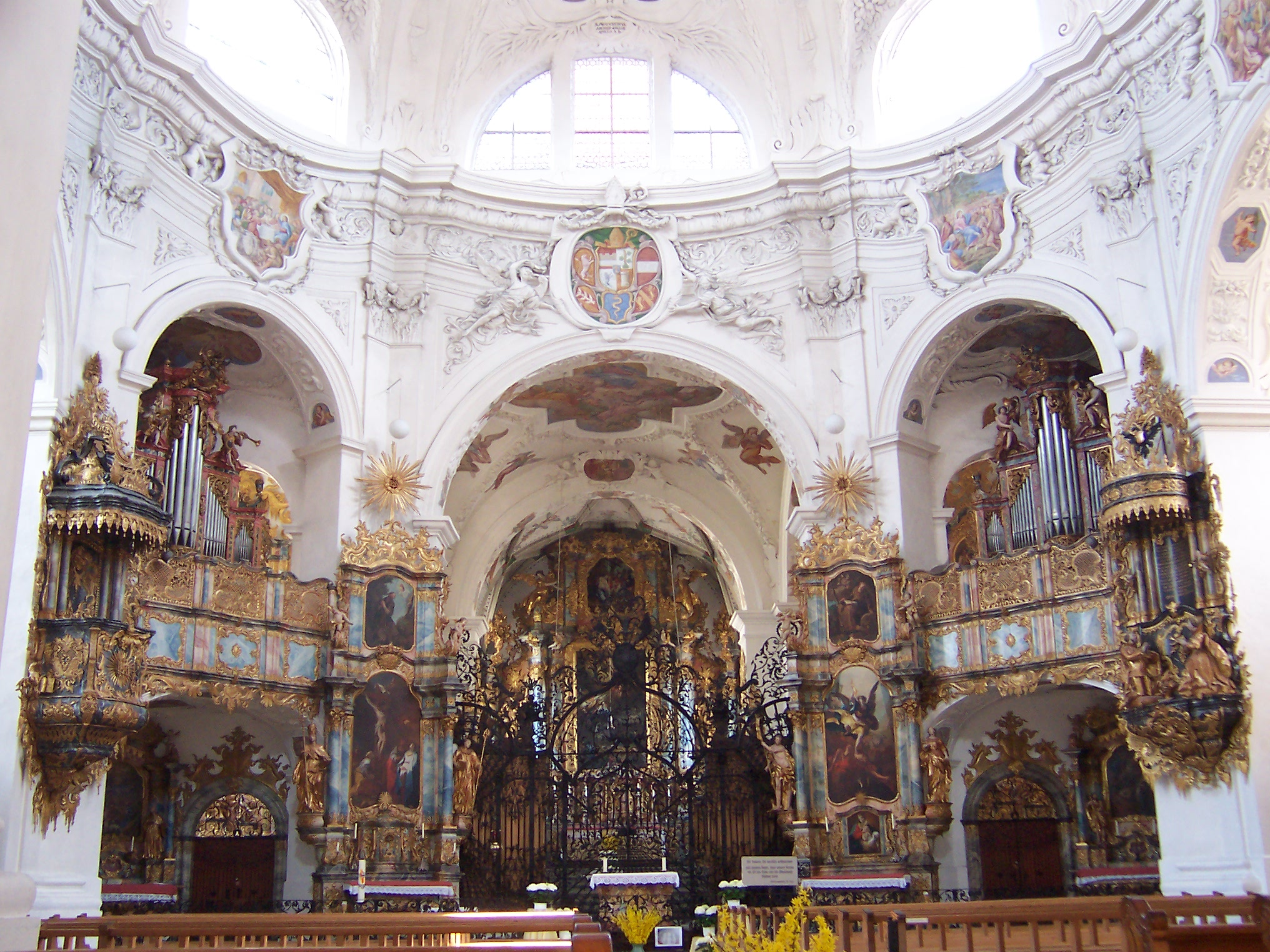
Muri Abbey from the inside

The dominant landmark of Muri is Muri Abbey. This is a nearly 1000-year-old Benedictine. Its centerpiece is an in Baroque constructed, octagonal central building (Octagon) from the 17th Century. The central building is enclosed by one from the 11th -Century Romance Church. Even elements of the Gothic Architectural style are represented. The church is rich with Frescoes and carvings.

In the Cloister with the valuable Glass painting cycle of the 16th Century is the Habsburg crypt. It contains the hearts of the last rulers of the Austrian Monarchy Emperor Charles I and Empress Zita of Bourbon-Parma and the hearts of other members of the Habsburg family. The bodies of the couple's sons Randolph and Felix are buried here.

The monastery museum houses valuable treasures of the monastery. There is also a permanent exhibition of the painter Caspar Wolf. The monastery church owns five organs.

=== Other structures ===
The parish church of St. Goar is from the period around 1030th to about 1335 and parts have survived from this period, however, only the foundations of the church tower remain. In 1583, the tower was rebuilt. From 1640 to 1644, it was rebuilt in the baroque style from scratch. In 1677 the choir altar was taken away, and was replaced 1837/38. The last major renovation took place 1987/88. North of the parish is the parish house which was built in 1747.

Halfway between the parish and monastery church is the courthouse. It was built in 1660 and was initially commissioned by the monastery as a guesthouse. Today it is used by the district court.

== Crest ==
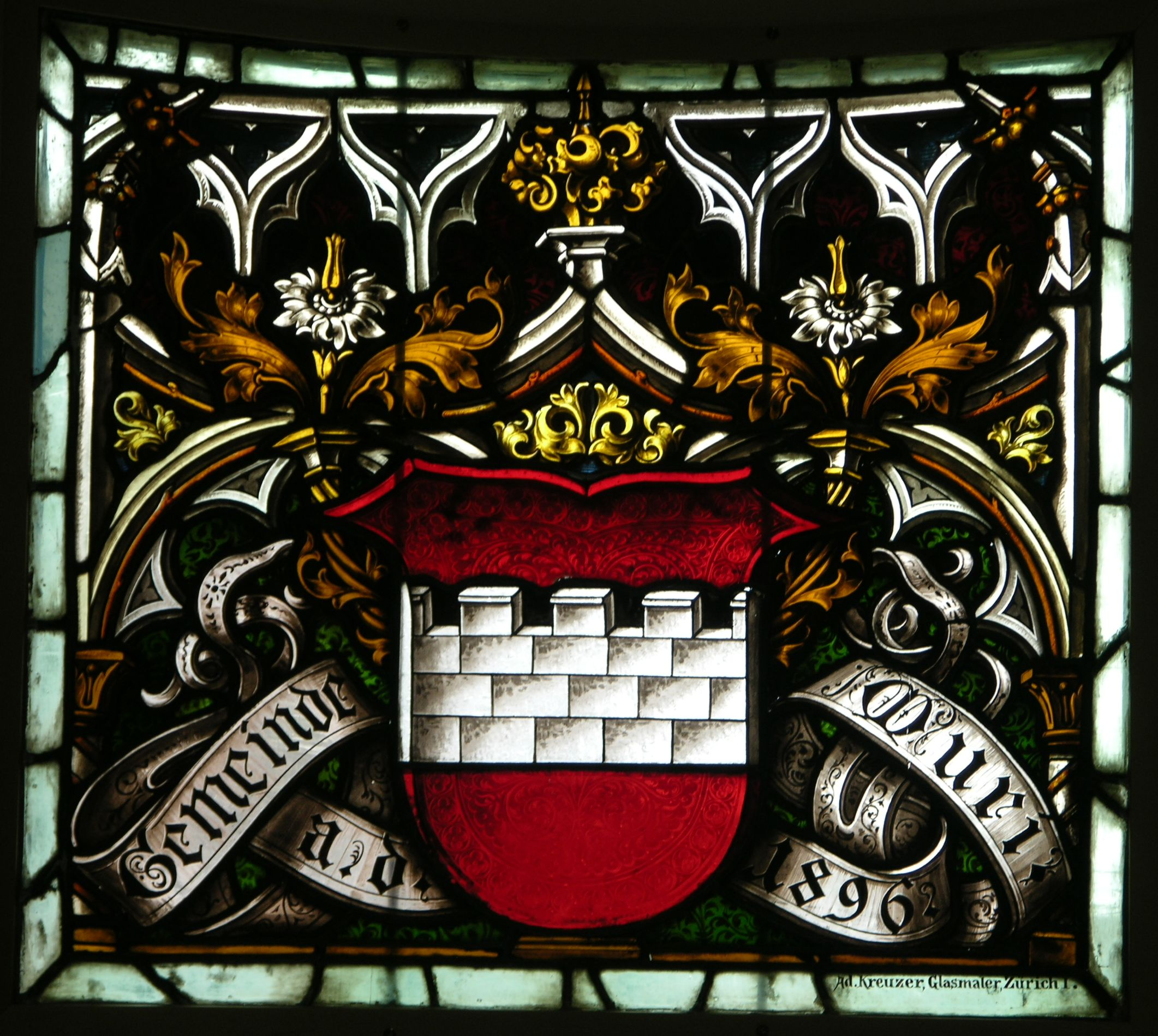
Shield of Muri

The blazon of the municipal coat of arms is Gules a Wall Argent embattled or "In red double-breasted, black Grooved white wall with three towers." In 1930, they adopted the arms of the former monastery, which the abbot John Feierabend imposed in 1508. The wall was first three rows, but since 1972 it has only two rows. The District crest, however, remained unchanged.

== Demographics ==
Muri has a population (as of December 2020) of 8,244. As of June 2009, 20.8% of the population are foreign nationals. Over the last 10 years (1997–2007) the population has changed at a rate of 11%. Most of the population (as of 2000) speaks German (86.4%), with Albanian being second most common ( 4.2%) and Italian being third (2.7%). Serbo-Croatian was fourth with 2.2%, and fifth at 1.1% was Portuguese.

The age distribution, as of 2008, in Muri is; 788 children or 11.6% of the population are between 0 and 9 years old and 853 teenagers or 12.6% are between 10 and 19. Of the adult population, 946 people or 14.0% of the population are between 20 and 29 years old. 909 people or 13.4% are between 30 and 39, 1,085 people or 16.0% are between 40 and 49, and 849 people or 12.5% are between 50 and 59. The senior population distribution is 698 people or 10.3% of the population are between 60 and 69 years old, 413 people or 6.1% are between 70 and 79, there are 213 people or 3.1% who are between 80 and 89, and there are 24 people or 0.4% who are 90 and older.

As of 2000, there were 279 homes with 1 or 2 persons in the household, 1,218 homes with 3 or 4 persons in the household, and 871 homes with 5 or more persons in the household. As of 2000, there were 2,436 private households (homes and apartments) in the municipality, and an average of 2.5 persons per household. In 2008 there were 934 single family homes (or 32.6% of the total) out of a total of 2,865 homes and apartments. There were a total of 13 empty apartments for a 0.5% vacancy rate. As of 2007, the construction rate of new housing units was 7.2 new units per 1000 residents.

In the 2007 federal election the most popular party was the SVP which received 34.6% of the vote. The next three most popular parties were the CVP (24.5%), the SP (16.1%) and the FDP (10.3%).

The historical population is given in the following table:

Historical population
Year	Pop.	±%
1755	1,966	—
1799	1,397	−28.9%
1850	1,966	+40.7%
1900	2,073	+5.4%
1950	3,680	+77.5%
1970	4,853	+31.9%
2000	6,545	+34.9%

== Religion ==
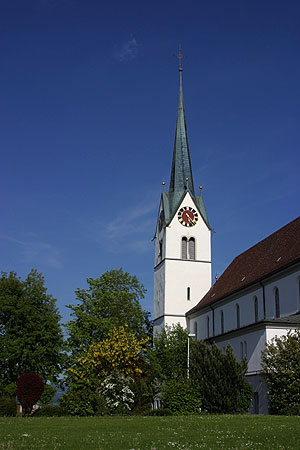
Church in Muri

From the 2000 census, 4,172 or 63.7% were Roman Catholic, while 1,088 or 16.6% belonged to the Swiss Reformed Church. Of the rest of the population, there were 8 individuals (or about 0.12% of the population) who belonged to the Christian Catholic faith. In the same census, 6.9% of the population was Muslim and 1.0% belonged to other faiths.

== Politics and Law ==
The Congregational assembly of electors exercises the legislative power. The executive body is the five-member Municipal. His term of office is four years and he is elected by the people with a majority vote. He leads and represents the community. In addition, he implements the decisions of the municipal assembly and the tasks that were assigned to him by the canton and the Confederation. Mayor of the term 2006-2009 is Joseph Etterlin (CVP).

Muri is the seat of the District Court and the Peace of the district Muri.

== Economy ==
As of 2007, Muri had an unemployment rate of 2.22%. As of 2005, there were 176 people employed in the primary economic sector and about 47 businesses involved in this sector. 1,645 people are employed in the secondary sector and there are 92 businesses in this sector. 2,209 people are employed in the tertiary sector, with 271 businesses in this sector.

In 2000 there were 3,453 workers who lived in the municipality. Of these, 1,905 or about 55.2% of the residents worked outside Muri while 1,918 people commuted into the municipality for work. There were a total of 3,466 jobs (of at least 6 hours per week) in the municipality. Of the working population, 10.3% used public transportation to get to work, and 49.6% used a private car.

The main manufacturing sectors are metal processing, chemicals, plastics processing, production of fruit juices, and the manufacture of appliances, precision instruments and electronic devices.

Muri houses the District Hospital for the Freiamt. This regional hospital is for the whole region of Freiamt jurisdiction and covers a catchment area from more than 100,000 inhabitants.

== Transport ==
Muri has its own railway station, which is located on the Aargau Southern Railway line. The station is served by services of the Aargau S-Bahn and the S42 of the Zurich S-Bahn, which is a rush-hour service.

== Education ==
In Muri about 67.9% of the population (between age 25-64) have completed either non-mandatory upper secondary education or additional higher education (either university or a Fachhochschule). Of the school age population (in the 2008/2009 school year), there are 518 students attending primary school, there are 303 students attending secondary school, there are 349 students attending tertiary or university level schooling, and there are 14 students who are seeking a job after school in the municipality.

There are five educational centers in Muri (Bachmatten, Badweiher, the monastery, and Rösslimattstrasse). Some classes of Primary school are housed in a wing of the monastery. The closest School District (High School) is located in Wohlen.

== Notable people ==
- Conrad of Mure (c. 1210-1281), author of Latin didactic
- John Feierabend (c. 1440-1508), John II as Abbot of Muri 1500-1508
- Silvio Galizia (1925-1989), architect
- Caspar Wolf (1735–1783), painter
- Theodore Wolf (1770–1818), painter
- Roland Koch (born 1959), actor
- Walter Thurnherr (born 1963), Federal Chancellor of Switzerland (2016-present)
