= Geltwil =

- Municipality
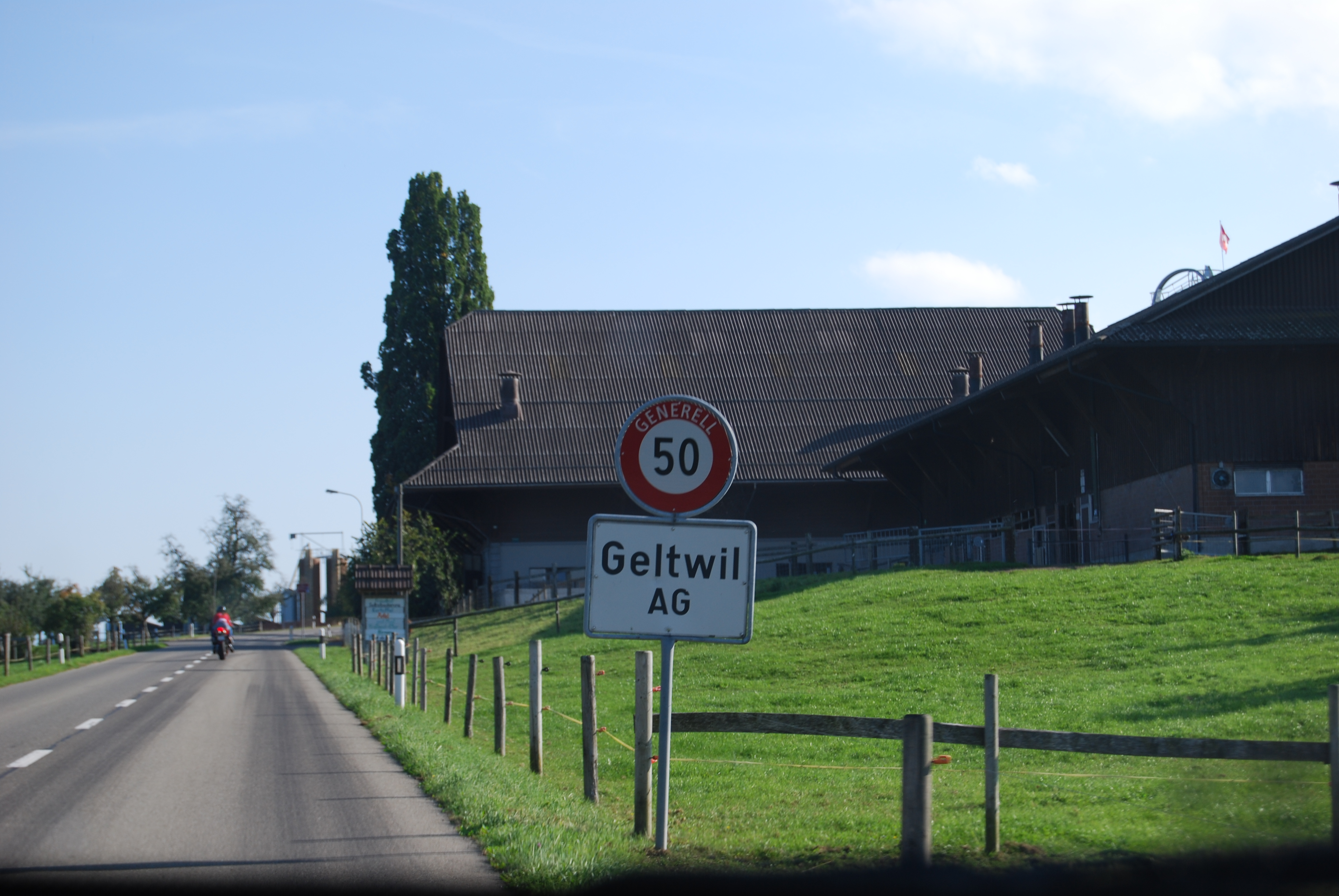

- Flag Coat of arms
- Location of Geltwil
- Location within Switzerland Location within Canton of Aargau
- Coordinates: 47°15′N 8°20′E
- Country: Switzerland
- Canton: Aargau
- District: Muri

Area
  - Total: 3.28 km^{2} (1.27 sq mi)
- Elevation: 681 m (2,234 ft)

Population (December 2006)
  - Total: 180
  - Density: 55/km^{2} (140/sq mi)
- Time zone: UTC+01:00 (CET)
  - Summer (DST): UTC+02:00 (CEST)
- Postal code: 5637
- SFOS number: 4232
- ISO 3166 code: CH-AG
- Surrounded by: Beinwil (Freiamt), Benzenschwil, Buttwil, Muri, Müswangen (LU)
- Website: www.geltwil.ch

Geltwil is a municipality in the district of Muri in the canton of Aargau in Switzerland.

== History ==
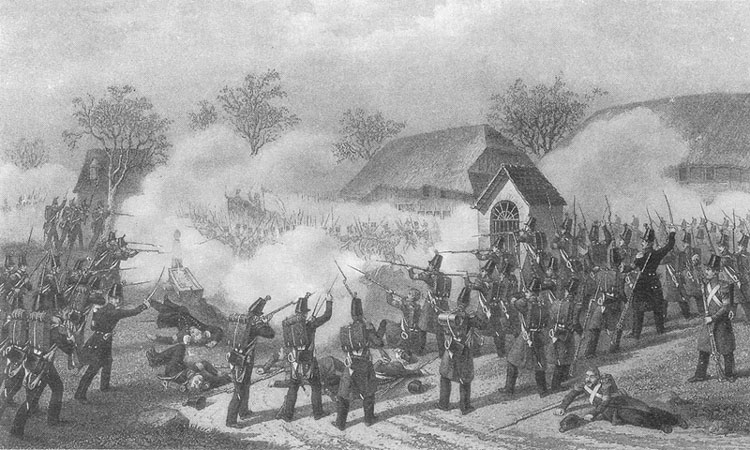
Battle of Geltwil during the Sonderbund War

The earliest trace of human settlement near Geltwil is a Roman era villa. The modern municipality of Geltwil is first mentioned in 1160 as Geltwile. The history of Geltwil was always closely connected with Muri Abbey. In the 13th century the main part of the land was given by Habsburgs to the abbey. Even after the conquest of the Aargau in 1415 the village belonged the Muri district.

Geltwil is also part of the Muri parish. Between 1798 and 1803, Geltwil, Isenbergschwil and Winterschwil formed a collective community. In 1816, a reorganization of the district of Muri, led to creation of today's community.

With a nearly constant population, Geltwil has remained a purely farming village. In the center is the school house was built in 1972 and the memorial to the battle that took place during the Sonderbund War in Geltwil in 1847. In 1942, the municipality refused to bow to Axis pressure and introduce Daylight saving time.

== Geography ==
Geltwil has an area, as of 2009, of 3.3 square kilometers (1.3 sq mi). Of this area, 2.65 km^{2} (1.02 sq mi) or 80.3% is used for agricultural purposes, while 0.5 km^{2} (0.19 sq mi) or 15.2% is forested. Of the rest of the land, 0.16 km^{2} (0.062 sq mi) or 4.8% is settled (buildings or roads).

Of the built up area, housing and buildings made up 2.4% and transportation infrastructure made up 2.4%. Out of the forested land, 13.6% of the total land area is heavily forested and 1.5% is covered with orchards or small clusters of trees. Of the agricultural land, 48.8% is used for growing crops and 28.8% is pastures, while 2.7% is used for orchards or vine crops.

The municipality is located in the Muri district on the eastern slope of the Lindenberg. It consists of the villages of Geltwil and Isenbergschwil.

== Coat of arms ==
The blazon of the municipal coat of arms is Gules a Bath-Tub Or and in chief a Coin of the same bearing a Cross recercelée Sable and Coupeaux Vert.

== Demographics ==
Geltwil has a population (as of December 2020) of 221 As of June 2009, 8.7% of the population are foreign nationals. Over the last 10 years (1997–2007) the population has changed at a rate of 24.3%. Most of the population (as of 2000) speaks German(94.2%), with French being second most common ( 2.9%) and Italian being third ( 0.7%).

The age distribution, as of 2008, in Geltwil is; 27 children or 14.1% of the population are between 0 and 9 years old and 33 teenagers or 17.2% are between 10 and 19. Of the adult population, 29 people or 15.1% of the population are between 20 and 29 years old. 21 people or 10.9% are between 30 and 39, 32 people or 16.7% are between 40 and 49, and 29 people or 15.1% are between 50 and 59. The senior population distribution is 16 people or 8.3% of the population are between 60 and 69 years old, 1 person is between 70 and 79, there are 2 people or 1.0% who are between 80 and 89, and there are 2 people or 1.0% who are 90 and older.

As of 2000 the average number of residents per living room was 0.57 which is about equal to the cantonal average of 0.57 per room. In this case, a room is defined as space of a housing unit of at least 4 m^{2} (43 sq ft) as normal bedrooms, dining rooms, living rooms, kitchens and habitable cellars and attics. About 71.4% of the total households were owner occupied, or in other words did not pay rent (though they may have a mortgage or a rent-to-own agreement).

As of 2000, there were 1 homes with 1 or 2 persons in the household, 8 homes with 3 or 4 persons in the household, and 33 homes with 5 or more persons in the household. As of 2000, there were 42 private households (homes and apartments) in the municipality, and an average of 3.3 persons per household. In 2008 there were 29 single family homes (or 42.6% of the total) out of a total of 68 homes and apartments. There were a total of 0 empty apartments for a 0.0% vacancy rate. As of 2007, the construction rate of new housing units was 10.6 new units per 1000 residents.

In the 2007 federal election the most popular party was the SVP which received 34.8% of the vote. The next three most popular parties were the CVP (26.4%), the FDP (16.7%) and the SP (14.2%).

The historical population is given in the following table:

Historical population
Year	Pop.	±%
1850	207	—
1900	154	−25.6%
1950	158	+2.6%
2000	137	−13.3%

== Heritage sites of national significance ==
The house at Isenbergschwilerstrasse 37 is listed as a Swiss heritage site of national significance.

== Economy ==
As of 2007, Geltwil had an unemployment rate of 1.52%. As of 2005, there were 32 people employed in the primary economic sector and about 12 businesses involved in this sector. 1 person is employed in the secondary sector and there is 1 business in this sector. 18 people are employed in the tertiary sector, with 5 businesses in this sector.

In 2000 there were 75 workers who lived in the municipality. Of these, 49 or about 65.3% of the residents worked outside Geltwil while 11 people commuted into the municipality for work. There were a total of 37 jobs (of at least 6 hours per week) in the municipality. Of the working population, 7.8% used public transportation to get to work, and 40.3% used a private car.

== Religion ==
From the 2000 census, 95 or 69.3% were Roman Catholic, while 21 or 15.3% belonged to the Swiss Reformed Church. Of the rest of the population, there was 1 individual who belonged to the Christian Catholic faith.

== Education ==
The entire Swiss population is generally well educated. In Geltwil about 80% of the population (between age 25 and 64) have completed either non-mandatory upper secondary education or additional higher education (either university or a Fachhochschule). Of the school age population (in the 2008/2009 school year), there are 18 students attending primary school in the municipality.
