= Benzenschwil =

- Former municipality
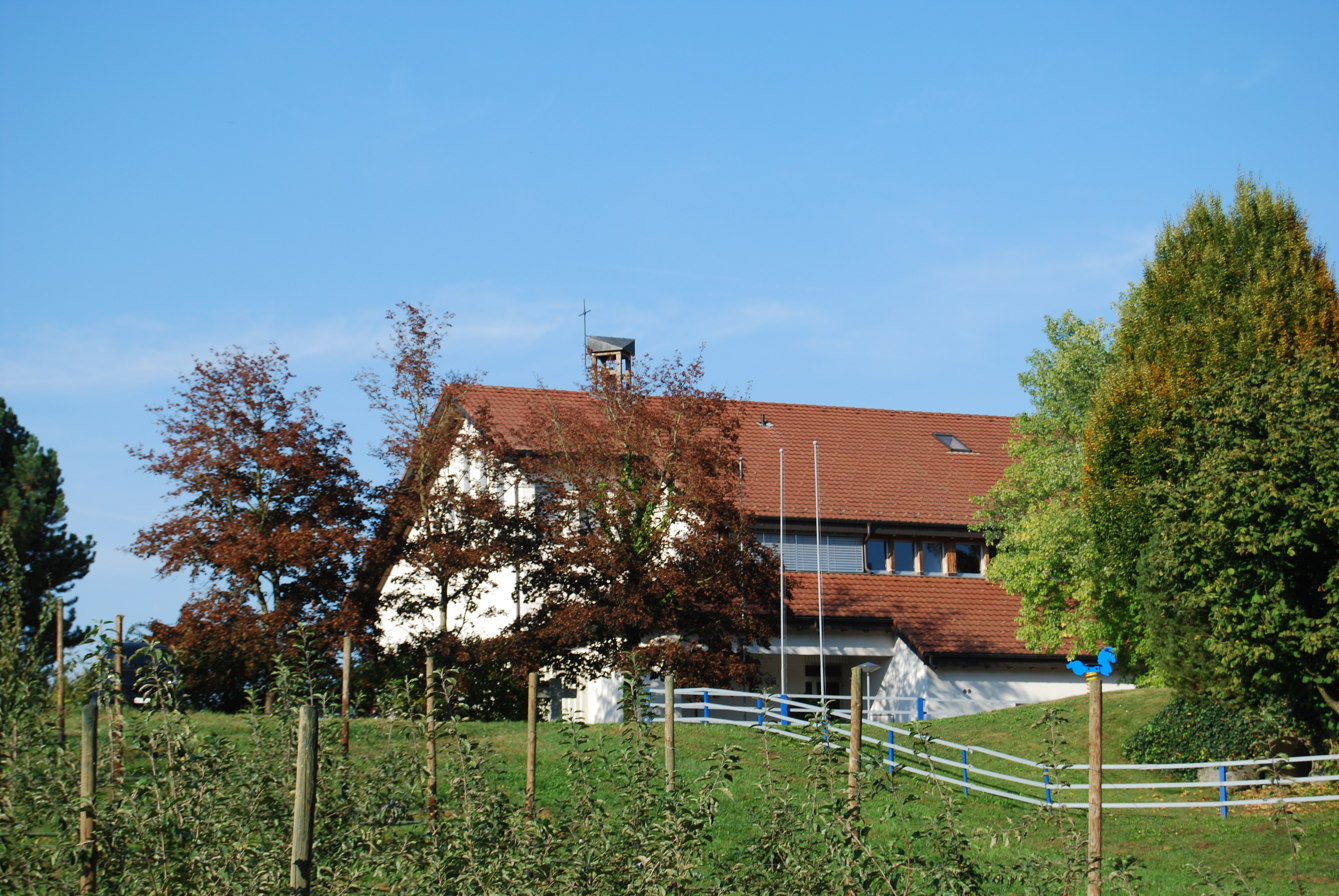

- Flag Coat of arms
- Location of Benzenschwil
- Location within Switzerland Location within Canton of Aargau
- Coordinates: 47°14′N 8°24′E
- Country: Switzerland
- Canton: Aargau
- District: Muri

Area
  - Total: 2.46 km^{2} (0.95 sq mi)
- Elevation: 459 m (1,506 ft)

Population (December 2010)
  - Total: 548
  - Density: 223/km^{2} (577/sq mi)
- Time zone: UTC+01:00 (CET)
  - Summer (DST): UTC+02:00 (CEST)
- Postal code: 5636
- SFOS number: 4225
- ISO 3166 code: CH-AG
- Surrounded by: Beinwil (Freiamt), Geltwil, Merenschwand, Mühlau, Muri
- Website: SFSO statistics

Benzenschwil is a former municipality in the district of Muri in the canton of Aargau in Switzerland. The municipality of Benzenschwil merged on 1 January 2012 into the municipality of Merenschwand.

== History ==
Benzenschwil is first mentioned in 1189 as Penziswile. In the Middle Ages, the major landholders included the Lords of Hünenberg (owner of the high and low justice rights) and the Frauenthal and Muri monasteries. The monasteries bought their rights in 1267 from Johannes von Schnabelburg. In 1394 the Merenschwand district, which included Benzenschwil, bought its freedom and placed itself under the city of Lucerne. Until the end of the Helvetic Republic it remained as part of Lucerne. In 1803, Benzenschwil, and the rest of the Merenschwand district, became part of the newly formed Canton of Aargau. In 1813, Benzenschwil separated from Merenschwand and became an independent municipality. Village fires destroyed 13 households in 1799 and 19 in 1803.

The population of Benzenschwil belongs to the Merenschwand parish, but since 1972 have a chapel that is integrated into the village school.

Economically, agriculture is one of major sources of income in the village. In 1990, 37% of the workers in Benzenschwil worked in agriculture. From the mid-19th Century to 1985 the straw industry provided a few jobs. Despite the railway station that opened in 1881, there are very few other jobs in the village. By 1990, 74% of the workers commuted outside the village for work.

== Geography ==
Benzenschwil has an area, as of 2009, of 2.46 square kilometers (0.95 sq mi). Of this area, 1.46 km^{2} (0.56 sq mi) or 59.3% is used for agricultural purposes, while 0.68 km^{2} (0.26 sq mi) or 27.6% is forested. Of the rest of the land, 0.27 km^{2} (0.10 sq mi) or 11.0% is settled (buildings or roads).

Of the built up area, housing and buildings made up 6.5% and transportation infrastructure made up 3.7%. Out of the forested land, 26.4% of the total land area is heavily forested and 1.2% is covered with orchards or small clusters of trees. Of the agricultural land, 40.7% is used for growing crops and 16.7% is pastures, while 2.0% is used for orchards or vine crops.

The municipality is located in the Muri district, on the eastern foot of the Lindenberg in the upper Freiamt. It consists of the village of Benzenschwil. The municipalities of Benzenschwil and Merenschwand are seeking approval from the Canton to merge on 1 January 2012 into a new municipality which will be known as Merenschwand.

== Coat of arms ==
The blazon of the municipal coat of arms is Azure an Arm proper issuant from sinister clad in shirt Argent and overcoat Or holding an Auger of the second with a handle of the third.

== Demographics ==
Benzenschwil has a population (as of 2010) of 548. As of June 2009, 10.7% of the population are foreign nationals. Over the last 10 years (1997–2007) the population has changed at a rate of 4%. Most of the population (as of 2000) speaks German (95.9%), with French being second most common ( 0.8%) and Italian being third ( 0.8%).

The age distribution, as of 2008, in Benzenschwil is; 49 children or 8.8% of the population are between 0 and 9 years old and 97 teenagers or 17.5% are between 10 and 19. Of the adult population, 68 people or 12.3% of the population are between 20 and 29 years old. 55 people or 9.9% are between 30 and 39, 130 people or 23.4% are between 40 and 49, and 79 people or 14.2% are between 50 and 59. The senior population distribution is 32 people or 5.8% of the population are between 60 and 69 years old, 29 people or 5.2% are between 70 and 79, there are 13 people or 2.3% who are between 80 and 89, and there are 3 people or 0.5% who are 90 and older.

As of 2000 the average number of residents per living room was 0.58 which is about equal to the cantonal average of 0.57 per room. In this case, a room is defined as space of a housing unit of at least 4 m^{2} (43 sq ft) as normal bedrooms, dining rooms, living rooms, kitchens and habitable cellars and attics. About 67.8% of the total households were owner occupied, or in other words did not pay rent (though they may have a mortgage or a rent-to-own agreement).

As of 2000, there were 10 homes with 1 or 2 persons in the household, 62 homes with 3 or 4 persons in the household, and 108 homes with 5 or more persons in the household. As of 2000, there were 185 private households (homes and apartments) in the municipality, and an average of 2.8 persons per household. In 2008 there were 129 single family homes (or 59.2% of the total) out of a total of 218 homes and apartments. There were a total of 0 empty apartments for a 0.0% vacancy rate. As of 2007, the construction rate of new housing units was 7.3 new units per 1000 residents.

In the 2007 federal election the most popular party was the SVP which received 43.1% of the vote. The next three most popular parties were the CVP (22.9%), the SP (13.4%) and the Green Party (9.3%).

The historical population is given in the following table:

year	population
1850	324
1880	378
1900	308
1950	346
2000	518

== Economy ==
As of 2007, Benzenschwil had an unemployment rate of 2.83%. As of 2005, there were 38 people employed in the primary economic sector and about 13 businesses involved in this sector. 64 people are employed in the secondary sector and there are 8 businesses in this sector. 19 people are employed in the tertiary sector, with 10 businesses in this sector.

In 2000 there were 265 workers who lived in the municipality. Of these, 218 or about 82.3% of the residents worked outside Benzenschwil while 37 people commuted into the municipality for work. There were a total of 84 jobs (of at least 6 hours per week) in the municipality. Of the working population, 10% used public transportation to get to work, and 59.6% used a private car.

== Religion ==
From the 2000 census, 355 or 68.5% were Roman Catholic, while 97 or 18.7% belonged to the Swiss Reformed Church.

== Education ==
The entire Swiss population is generally well educated. In Benzenschwil about 77.8% of the population (between age 25-64) have completed either non-mandatory upper secondary education or additional higher education (either University or a Fachhochschule). Of the school age population (in the 2008/2009 school year), there are 53 students attending primary school in the municipality.
