= Beinwil (Freiamt) =

- Municipality
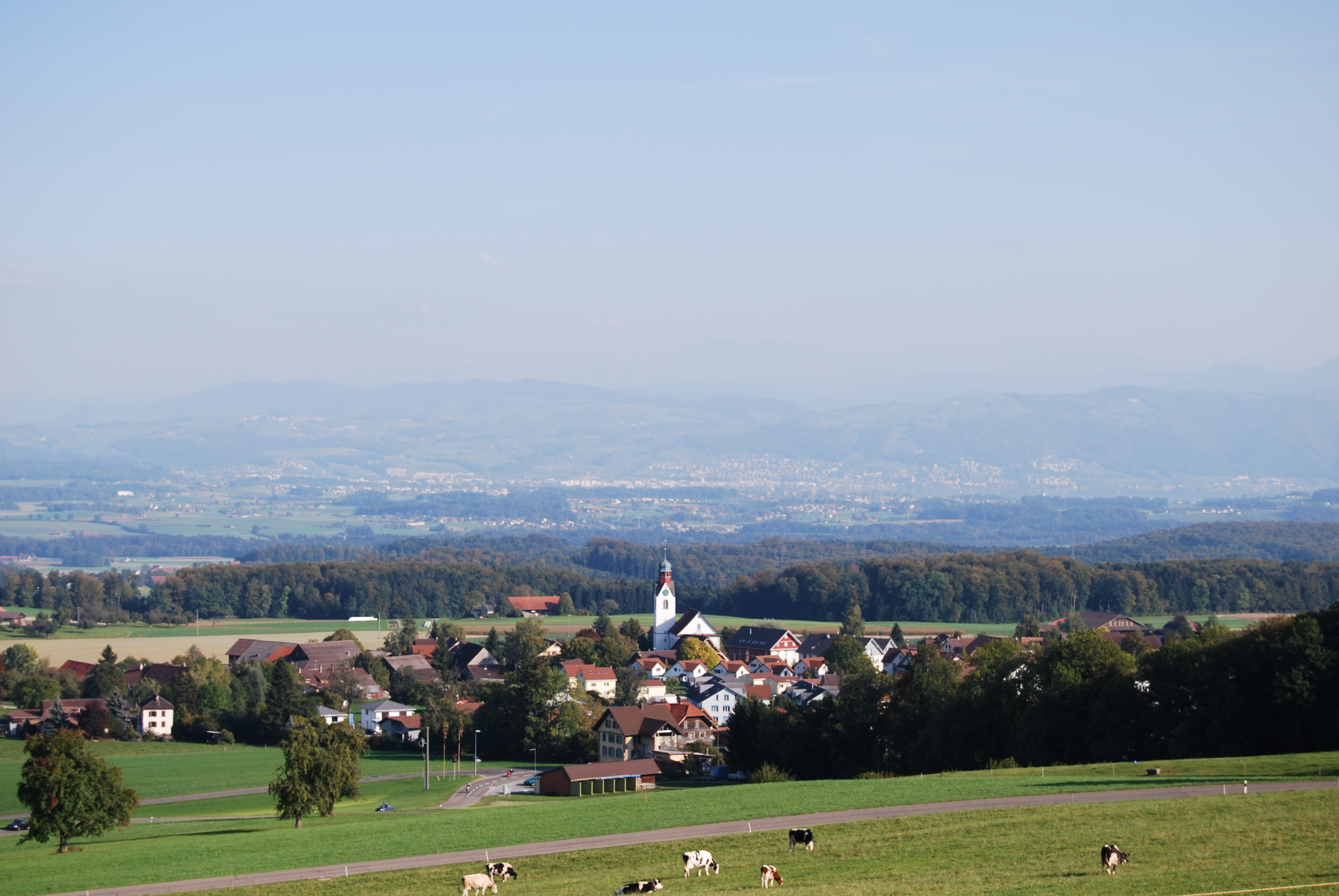

- Flag Coat of arms
- Location of Beinwil (Freiamt)
- Location within Switzerland Location within Canton of Aargau
- Coordinates: 47°14′N 8°21′E
- Country: Switzerland
- Canton: Aargau
- District: Muri

Area
  - Total: 11.28 km^{2} (4.36 sq mi)
- Elevation: 580 m (1,900 ft)

Population (December 2020)
  - Total: 1,183
  - Density: 104.9/km^{2} (271.6/sq mi)
- Time zone: UTC+01:00 (CET)
  - Summer (DST): UTC+02:00 (CEST)
- Postal code: 5637
- SFOS number: 4224
- ISO 3166 code: CH-AG
- Surrounded by: Auw, Benzenschwil, Geltwil, Hohenrain (LU), Lieli (LU), Mühlau, Müswangen (LU), Sulz (LU)
- Website: www.beinwil.ch

Beinwil (Freiamt) is a municipality in the district of Muri in the canton of Aargau in Switzerland.

== History ==
Aerial view (1952)

The earliest evidence of human settlement are scattered Roman era items. The modern municipality of Beinwil is first mentioned in 1153 as Beinwilare. Until 1950 it was known as Beinwil bei Muri. Originally, much of the property in the village was owned by Muri Abbey. In 1239 Hartmann Visilere granted all his possessions and rights in Beinwil to the Cistercian Kappel Abbey in Kappel am Albis. This property went to the city of Zurich in 1415. In 1527, Zurich also acquired the rights to the low courts in the municipality. In 1586 these rights went to the family of Holder Meyer in Lucerne, who sold them in 1614 to Muri Abbey. The Vogtei of Wiggwil was held by a Habsburg vassal, the Ministerialis (unfree knights) family of Gessler, until 1412.

The history of the parish is inextricably linked to the pilgrimage to the grave of St. Burkard of Beinwil, who died 18 May 1192(?) Burkard was the first pastor in Beinwil. His cult is documented by the 13th Century and he was canonized in 1817. The Church of Saint Peter and Paul is first mentioned in 1239. It was totally rebuilt in 1619-21. Since 1808 it has also been the Church of St. Burkhard. The Chapel of St. Lawrence, in the hamlet of Wallenschwil, was part of the Muri parish until 1856.

Economically, village life has always been dominated by agriculture. In 1990, 46% of the workers in the village were involved in agriculture.

== Geography ==
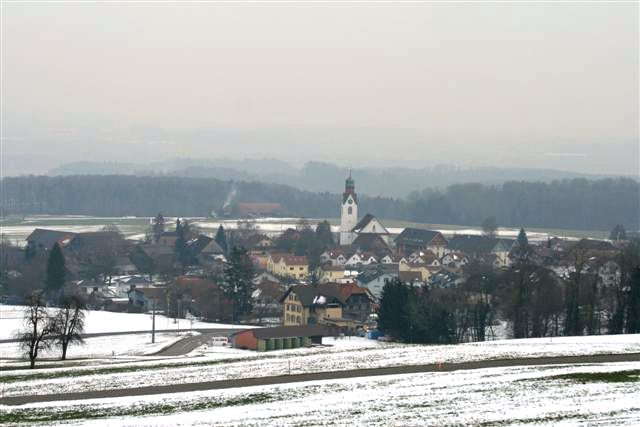
Beinwil

Beinwil (Freiamt) has an area, as of 2009, of 11.28 square kilometers (4.36 sq mi). Of this area, 8.53 km^{2} (3.29 sq mi) or 75.6% is used for agricultural purposes, while 2.02 km^{2} (0.78 sq mi) or 17.9% is forested. Of the rest of the land, 0.75 km^{2} (0.29 sq mi) or 6.6% is settled (buildings or roads), 0.02 km^{2} (4.9 acres) or 0.2% is either rivers or lakes.

Of the built up area, housing and buildings made up 3.3% and transportation infrastructure made up 2.4%. Out of the forested land, 16.4% of the total land area is heavily forested and 1.5% is covered with orchards or small clusters of trees. Of the agricultural land, 40.4% is used for growing crops and 32.9% is pastures, while 2.3% is used for orchards or vine crops. All the water in the municipality is in rivers and streams.

The municipality is located in the Muri district on the east slope of the Lindenberg. It consists of the village of Beinwil and the hamlets of Wiggwil, Brunnwil, Winterschwil and Wallenschwil, as well as Schloss Horben and the chapel in Horben.

== Coat of arms ==
The blazon of the municipal coat of arms is Or a Linden-tree eradicated Vert.

== Demographics ==
Beinwil (Freiamt) has a population (as of December 2020) of 1,183 As of June 2009, 8.8% of the population are foreign nationals. Over the last 10 years (1997–2007) the population has changed at a rate of 3.5%. Most of the population (as of 2000) speaks German (98.4%), with Albanian being second most common ( 0.5%) and Italian being third ( 0.2%).

The age distribution, as of 2008, in Beinwil (Freiamt) is; 132 children or 12.8% of the population are between 0 and 9 years old and 144 teenagers or 14.0% are between 10 and 19. Of the adult population, 152 people or 14.8% of the population are between 20 and 29 years old. 134 people or 13.0% are between 30 and 39, 162 people or 15.7% are between 40 and 49, and 138 people or 13.4% are between 50 and 59. The senior population distribution is 91 people or 8.8% of the population are between 60 and 69 years old, 42 people or 4.1% are between 70 and 79, there are 29 people or 2.8% who are between 80 and 89, and there are 5 people or 0.5% who are 90 and older.

As of 2000 the average number of residents per living room was 0.58 which is about equal to the cantonal average of 0.57 per room. In this case, a room is defined as space of a housing unit of at least 4 m^{2} (43 sq ft) as normal bedrooms, dining rooms, living rooms, kitchens and habitable cellars and attics. About 55.8% of the total households were owner occupied, or in other words did not pay rent (though they may have a mortgage or a rent-to-own agreement).

As of 2000, there were 28 homes with 1 or 2 persons in the household, 126 homes with 3 or 4 persons in the household, and 163 homes with 5 or more persons in the household. As of 2000, there were 324 private households (homes and apartments) in the municipality, and an average of 2.9 persons per household. In 2008 there were 140 single family homes (or 34.3% of the total) out of a total of 408 homes and apartments. There were a total of 1 empty apartments for a 0.2% vacancy rate. As of 2007, the construction rate of new housing units was 29.6 new units per 1000 residents.

In the 2007 federal election the most popular party was the SVP which received 41.7% of the vote. The next three most popular parties were the CVP (31%), the FDP (10.1%) and the SP (6.3%).

The historical population is given in the following table:

Historical population
Year	Pop.	±%
1850	871	—
1900	701	−19.5%
1950	759	+8.3%
2000	942	+24.1%

== Heritage sites of national significance ==
The farm house at Winterschwil 8, the Catholic church of St. Burkard in the Unterdorf and Horban Castle are listed as Swiss heritage sites of national significance. The entire hamlets of Wiggwil and Winterschwil are designated as part of the Inventory of Swiss Heritage Sites.

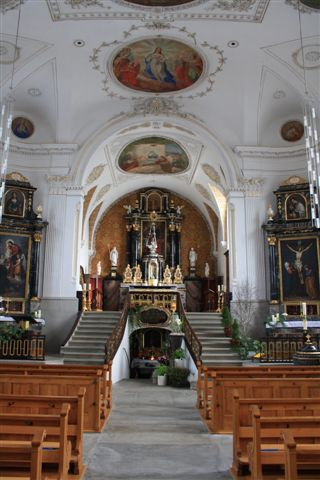
Interior of the church of St. Burkard

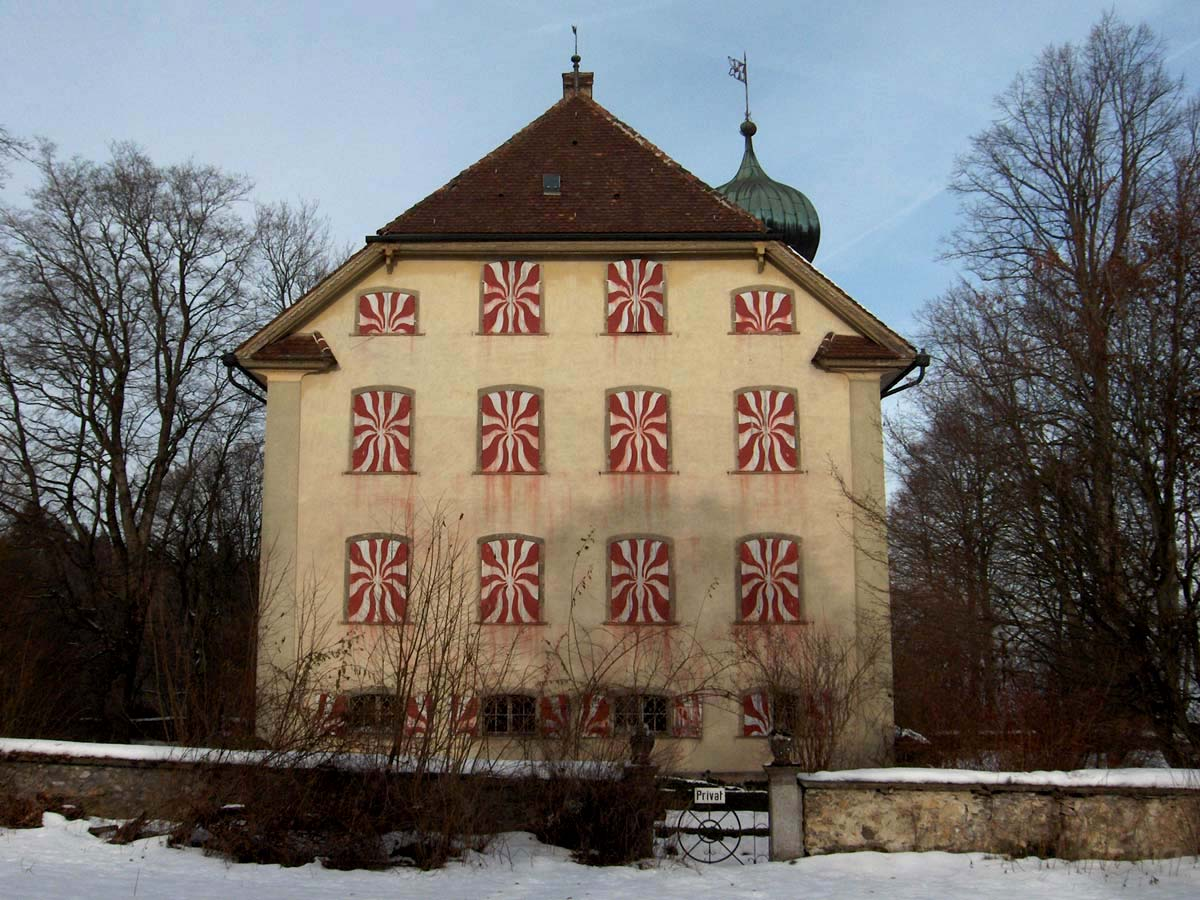
Castle Horben

== Economy ==
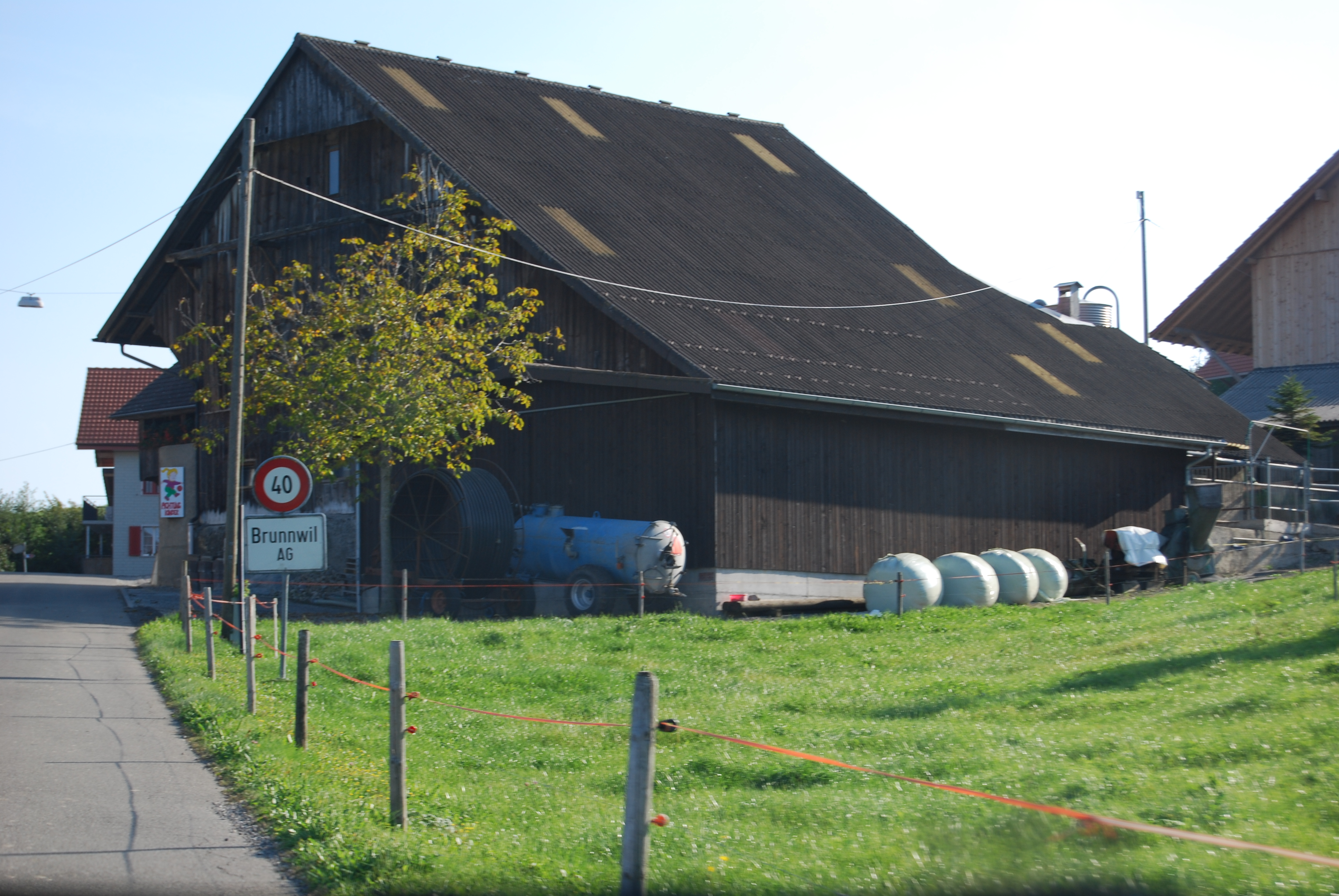
Farm house in Brunnwil hamlet. Farming makes up nearly half of the jobs in Beinwil

As of 2007, Beinwil (Freiamt) had an unemployment rate of 1.29%. As of 2005, there were 141 people employed in the primary economic sector and about 47 businesses involved in this sector. 103 people are employed in the secondary sector and there are 17 businesses in this sector. 82 people are employed in the tertiary sector, with 24 businesses in this sector.

In 2000 there were 518 workers who lived in the municipality. Of these, 359 or about 69.3% of the residents worked outside Beinwil (Freiamt) while 58 people commuted into the municipality for work. There were a total of 217 jobs (of at least 6 hours per week) in the municipality. Of the working population, 6% used public transportation to get to work, and 53.4% used a private car.

== Religion ==
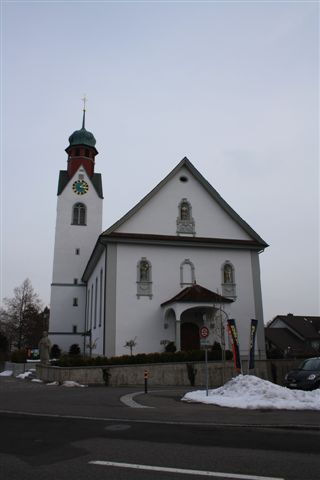
Pilgrimage church of Beinwil

From the 2000 census, 774 or 82.2% were Roman Catholic, while 94 or 10.0% belonged to the Swiss Reformed Church.

== Education ==
The entire Swiss population is generally well educated. In Beinwil (Freiamt) about 80% of the population (between age 25-64) have completed either non-mandatory upper secondary education or additional higher education (either university or a Fachhochschule). Of the school age population (in the 2008/2009 school year), there are 107 students attending primary school in the municipality.
