= Horben Castle =

Castle in Aargau, Switzerland

- Beinwil (Freiamt)
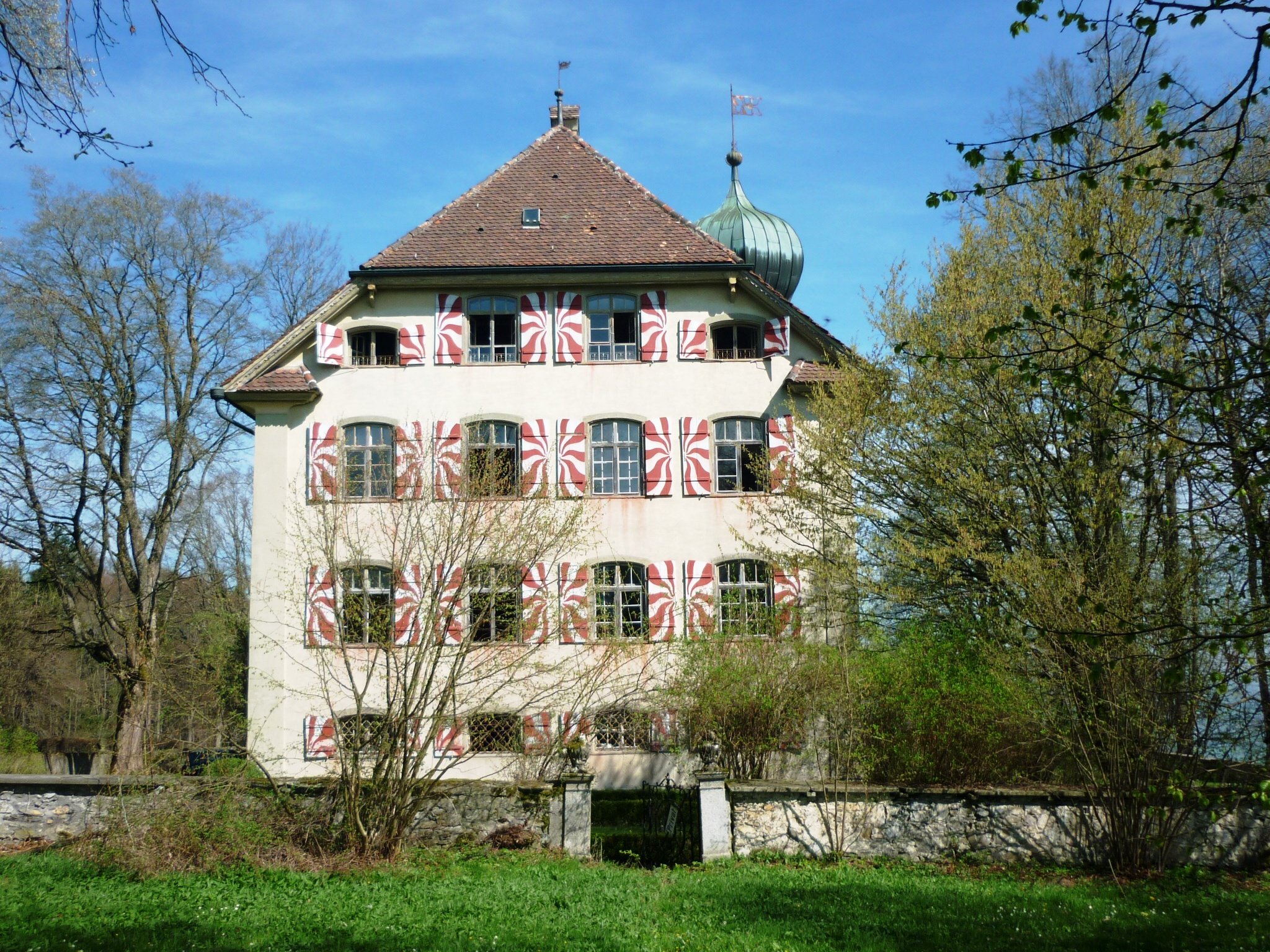
- Horben Castle

Site information
- Code: CH-AG
- Condition: preserved

Location
- Coordinates: 47°13′12.29″N 8°19′36.34″E
- Height: 818 m above the sea

Site history
- Built: 1700

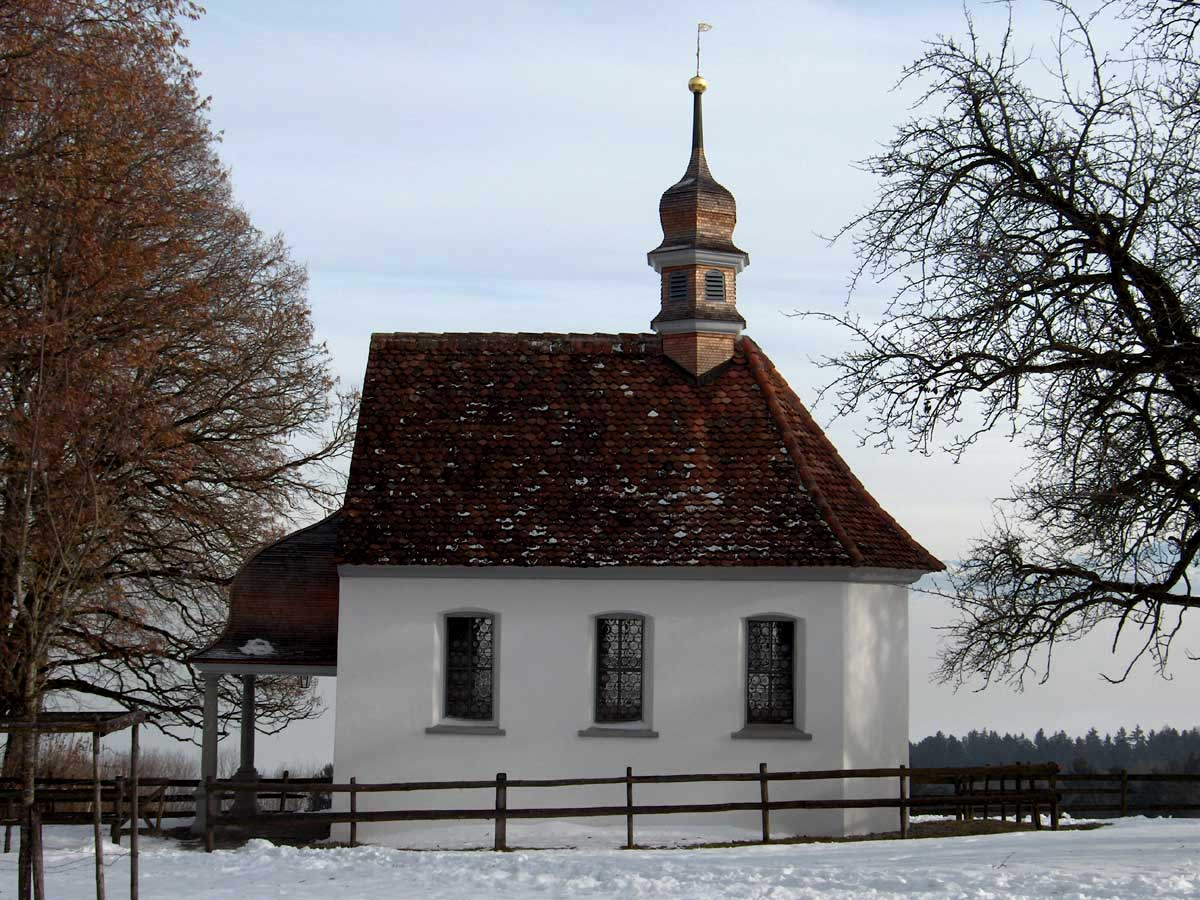
Horben chapel

Horben Castle (German: Schloss Horben) is a castle in the municipality of Beinwil (Freiamt) in the canton of Aargau. It is located at an elevation of 818 meters (2,684 ft) in the Horben-Hochebene near the border with the Canton of Lucerne.

In the 12th century Muri Abbey owned a farm on the Horben hill. Then, in 1700 Abbot Placidus Zurlauben build a rest home for the sacristan on the hill. The lower Prince-Abbot Gerold Haimb had the Chapel of St. Wendelin and Ubaldus built in 1730 near the home. Between 1752 and 1776, during Abbot Bonaventure Bucher's term of office, the house and chapel were rebuilt into their present form. In 1762 the interior was furnished with wall paintings and rococo statues by Caspar Wolf. After the dissolution of the monasteries in the Aargau in 1841, Horgen Castle was acquired by the Canton. In 1842 it was sold to a private purchaser. Initially it belonged, together with the nearby monastery, to the National Councilman Peter Suter from Sins. From 1885 to 1913 it was owned by District Officer Kaspar Weber of Muri, and since 1913 by the family Borsing. In 1979–80 the castle underwent a total restoration.

== See also ==
- List of castles and fortresses in Switzerland
