= Boswil =

- Municipality
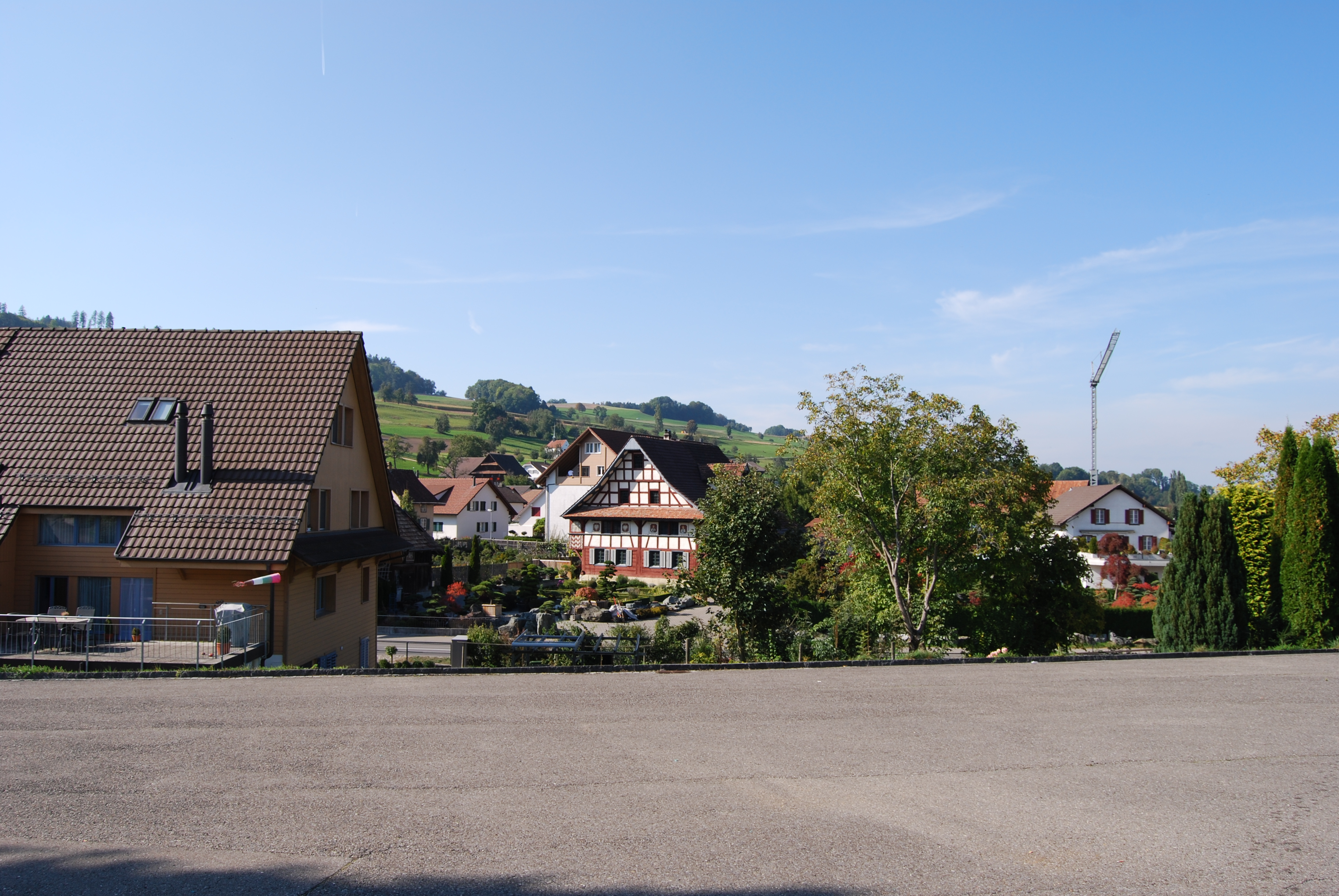

- Flag Coat of arms
- Location of Boswil
- Location within Switzerland Location within Canton of Aargau
- Coordinates: 47°18′N 8°19′E
- Country: Switzerland
- Canton: Aargau
- District: Muri

Government
  - Mayor: Michael Weber

Area
  - Total: 11.78 km^{2} (4.55 sq mi)
- Elevation: 456 m (1,496 ft)

Population (December 2020)
  - Total: 2,923
  - Density: 248.1/km^{2} (642.7/sq mi)
- Time zone: UTC+01:00 (CET)
  - Summer (DST): UTC+02:00 (CEST)
- Postal code: 5623
- SFOS number: 4228
- ISO 3166 code: CH-AG
- Surrounded by: Aristau, Besenbüren, Bettwil, Bünzen, Buttwil, Kallern, Muri, Waltenschwil
- Website: www.boswil.ch

Boswil is a municipality in the district of Muri in the canton of Aargau in Switzerland.

The village lies in the Bünztal valley at the foot of the Lindenberg mountain. The hamlet Wissenbach and Sentenhof (a former estate of the Benedictine Muri Abbey) belong to the municipality.

== History ==
During Neolithic times, between 10000 and 8000 BCE, settlements were first established near the fish-rich Bünzersee (a small lake). In 1930, a cemetery, dated to have been from between 350 and 325 BCE, was discovered north of Boswil, and is seen as evidence that the area was occupied by Celtic peoples during the same time period. Various wall remains of farm estates and mansions from Roman times lie nearby.

Boswil was first mentioned as Bozuuila in a document found in the Grossmünster church in Zürich. Although this document is not dated, recent research places the document's origin between 874 and 887 CE.

Boswil and the surrounding regions were ruled by successions of counts and dukes of the Habsburgs up until 1379, when they began losing territories to the expanding Swiss Confederates. The lords of Hallwyl maintained control over Boswil from 1380, until it was handed over to the ministrations of Muri Abbey in 1483. Meanwhile, the eight Old Cantons of the Old Swiss Confederacy had unified and taken control in 1415, and jointly exercised power in all external affairs.

In 1649, a third of the village was destroyed in a fire. After the Second War of Villmerger of 1712, the lands of the Freie Ämter were divided into two parts. One section of the new boundary line, extending west from the church in Oberlunkhofen to the Hochgericht in Fahrwangen, passed directly through Boswil, with the northern section under control of the Protestant cantons Zürich, Bern and Glarus, and the southern section under control of the catholic cantons. Because of its unique position under the domain of two separate jurisdictions, Boswil's development was constrained. Even with the formation of the Helvetic Republic in 1798, Boswil remained divided between the canton of Baden and the newly formed canton of Aargau, until the two cantons were merged in 1803 as the canton of Aargau. Since then, Boswil has been a part of the Muri district.

Industrialization began in 1874, when Boswil became a stop on the Aargauische Südbahn line from Aarau to Muri. From 1870, peat was dug from the Bünzmoos swampland which had resulted from the silting-up of the Bünzersee. In the 1930s and the 1940s, several peat mining companies came into prominence, and an area comprising over 2 square kilometers was cleared, to a depth of 6 meters. As more factories were built, Boswil developed to an industrial site.

== Geography ==
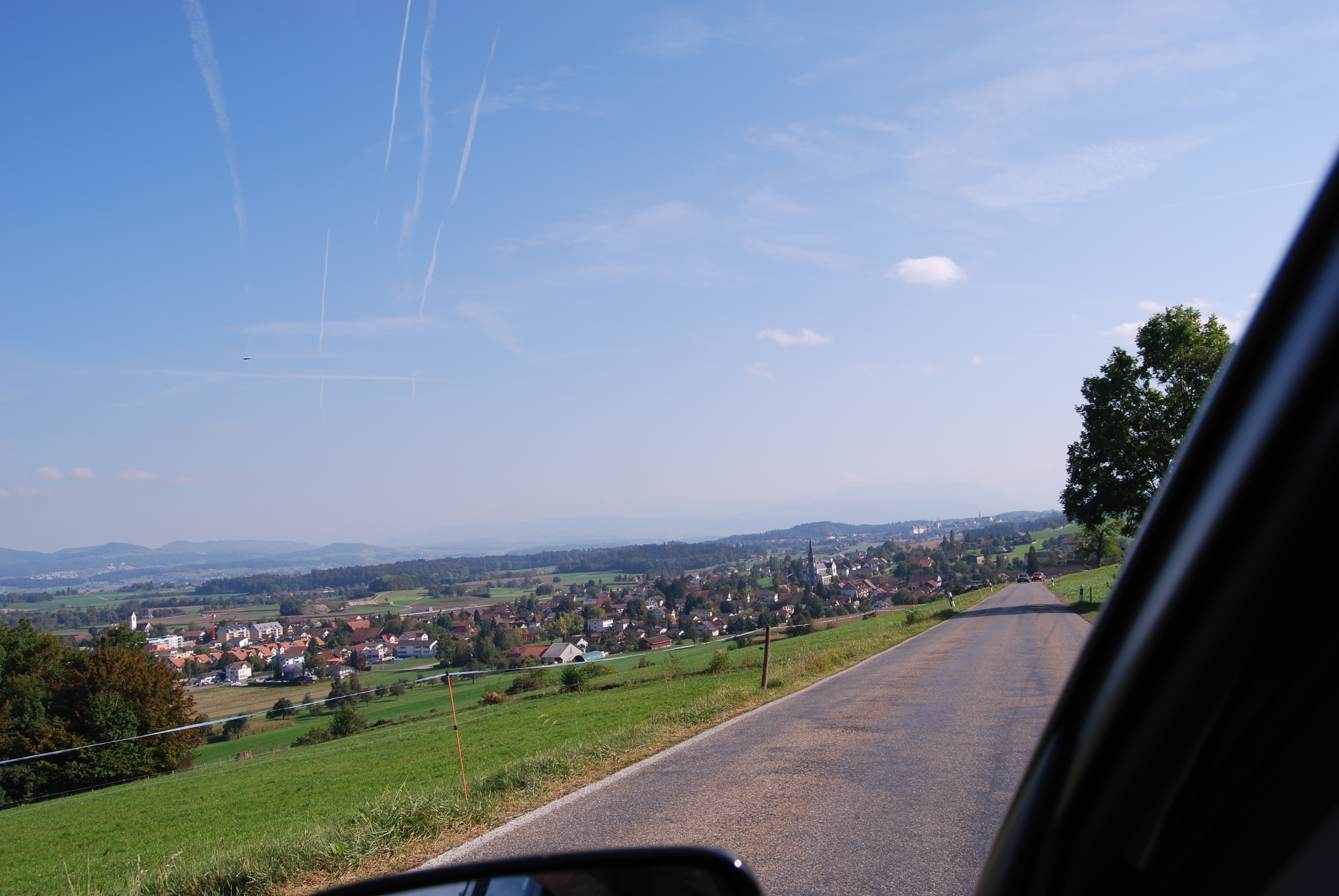
Boswil

Boswil has an area, as of 2009, of 11.77 square kilometers (4.54 sq mi). Of this area, 7.75 km^{2} (2.99 sq mi) or 65.8% is used for agricultural purposes, while 2.58 km^{2} (1.00 sq mi) or 21.9% is forested. Of the rest of the land, 1.28 km^{2} (0.49 sq mi) or 10.9% is settled (buildings or roads), 0.09 km^{2} (22 acres) or 0.8% is either rivers or lakes and 0.05 km^{2} (12 acres) or 0.4% is unproductive land.

Of the built up area, industrial buildings made up 1.2% of the total area while housing and buildings made up 5.4% and transportation infrastructure made up 3.7%. Out of the forested land, all of the forested land area is covered with heavy forests. Of the agricultural land, 48.3% is used for growing crops and 16.3% is pastures, while 1.2% is used for orchards or vine crops. All the water in the municipality is in rivers and streams.

The municipality is located in the Muri district, on the eastern slope of the Lindenberg in the Bünz river valley. It consists of the village of Boswil.

== Coat of arms ==
The blazon of the municipal coat of arms is Azure a Moon Or increscent with human face.

== Demographics ==
Boswil has a population (as of December 2020) of 2,923 As of June 2009, 12.9% of the population are foreign nationals. Over the last 10 years (1997–2007) the population has changed at a rate of 1.5%. Most of the population (as of 2000) speaks German (92.2%), with Italian being second most common ( 2.2%) and Albanian being third ( 1.4%).

The age distribution, as of 2008, in Boswil is; 213 children or 9.0% of the population are between 0 and 9 years old and 284 teenagers or 12.0% are between 10 and 19. Of the adult population, 361 people or 15.2% of the population are between 20 and 29 years old. 310 people or 13.1% are between 30 and 39, 416 people or 17.5% are between 40 and 49, and 333 people or 14.0% are between 50 and 59. The senior population distribution is 223 people or 9.4% of the population are between 60 and 69 years old, 147 people or 6.2% are between 70 and 79, there are 70 people or 3.0% who are between 80 and 89, and there are 14 people or 0.6% who are 90 and older.

As of 2000 the average number of residents per living room was 0.55 which is about equal to the cantonal average of 0.57 per room. In this case, a room is defined as space of a housing unit of at least 4 m^{2} (43 sq ft) as normal bedrooms, dining rooms, living rooms, kitchens and habitable cellars and attics. About 53.6% of the total households were owner occupied, or in other words did not pay rent (though they may have a mortgage or a rent-to-own agreement).

As of 2000, there were 76 homes with 1 or 2 persons in the household, 364 homes with 3 or 4 persons in the household, and 413 homes with 5 or more persons in the household. As of 2000, there were 882 private households (homes and apartments) in the municipality, and an average of 2.5 persons per household. In 2008 there were 395 single family homes (or 38.5% of the total) out of a total of 1,027 homes and apartments. There were a total of 70 empty apartments for a 6.8% vacancy rate. As of 2007, the construction rate of new housing units was 8.1 new units per 1000 residents.

In the 2007 federal election the most popular party was the SVP which received 44.1% of the vote. The next three most popular parties were the CVP (24.3%), the SP (10.6%) and the Green Party (7%).

The historical population is given in the following table:

Historical population
Year	Pop.	±%
1765	709	—
1850	1,249	+76.2%
1900	1,246	−0.2%
1950	1,463	+17.4%
2000	2,308	+57.8%

== Administration ==
Legislation is exercised by municipality meetings. Implementing this authority is the local council. Its term of office lasts four years, and then the majority choice candidate is selected by the people. The council leads and represents the town. In addition, it carries out the resolutions and tasks of the municipality meetings.

The 5 local councillors are:

- Alois Huber
- Ruedi Return
- Othmar Stoeckli
- Roger Wiesli
- Elmar Mueller

Four levels of law exist, with the district court of Muri being locally responsible. A justice of the peace is shared between the municipalities of Besenbueren, Bettwil, Bünzen, Kallern, Rottenschwil and Waltenschwil.

== Heritage sites of national significance ==
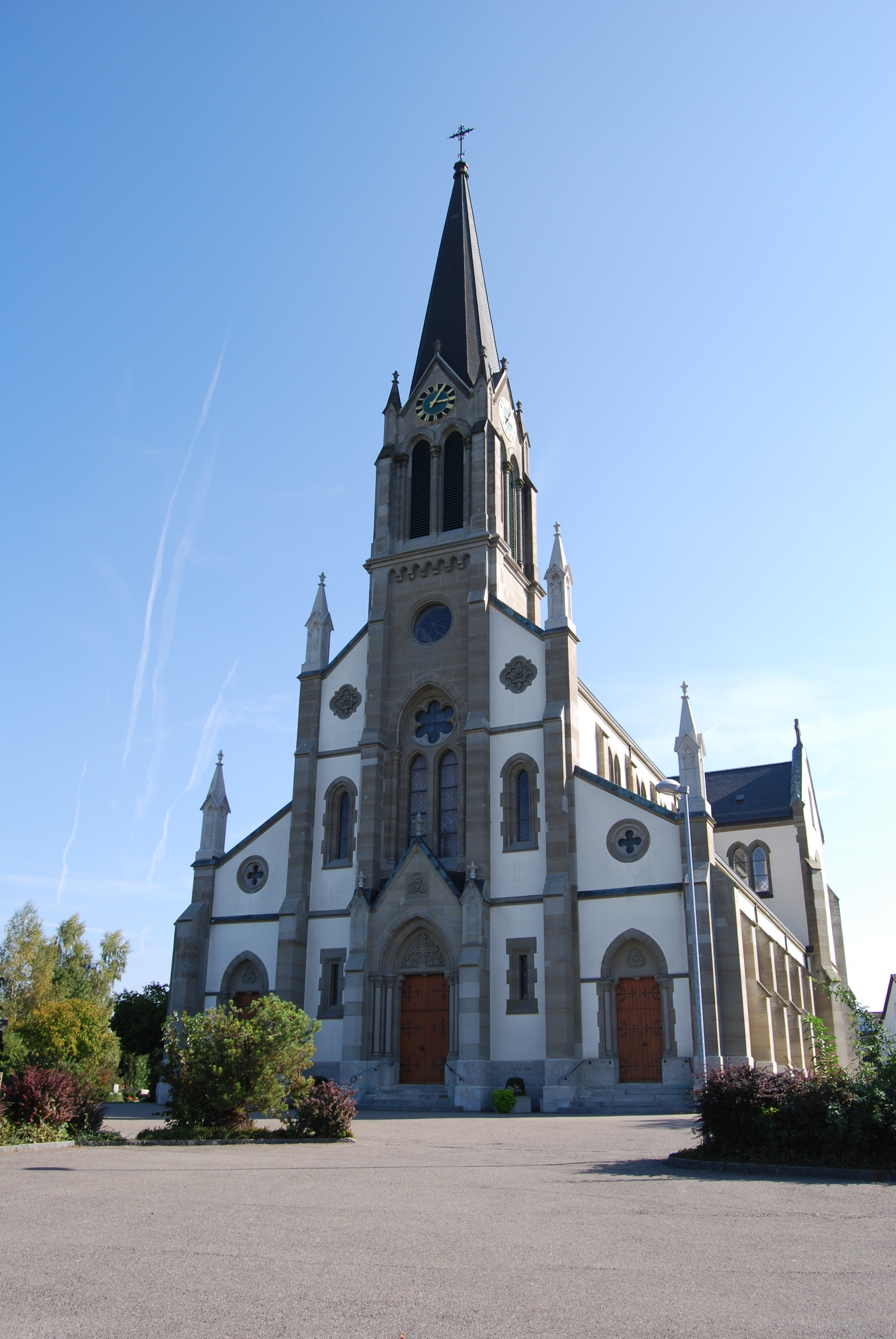
Church of St. Pankraz

The Catholic church of St. Pankraz, the Säge Weissenbach at Weissenbach 301 and House Nr. 169 on Niesenbergstrasse 6 are listed as Swiss heritage sites of national significance. The entire village of Boswil is designated as part of the Inventory of Swiss Heritage Sites.

The former parish church of St. Pankraz was built in the 17th century around a late-gothic tower. In the 18th century the exterior and interior were redecorated. In 1913 the church was put to profane use and since 1953 has served as a concert hall."

== Economy ==
As of 2007, Boswil had an unemployment rate of 1.21%. As of 2005, there were 145 people employed in the primary economic sector and about 43 businesses involved in this sector. 334 people are employed in the secondary sector and there are 45 businesses in this sector. 497 people are employed in the tertiary sector, with 77 businesses in this sector.

In 2000 there were 1,260 workers who lived in the municipality. Of these, 875 or about 69.4% of the residents worked outside Boswil while 505 people commuted into the municipality for work. There were a total of 890 jobs (of at least 6 hours per week) in the municipality. Of the working population, 9.5% used public transportation to get to work, and 52% used a private car.

The municipality possesses a considerable number of industrial companies, which are particularly active in the construction and transportation industries. This is beside several trade and service enterprises.

== Transportation ==
The main road of Lenzburg-Luzern passes through the middle of the village, and serves as a public traffic route. The Swiss Federal Railways have a station, Boswil-Bünzen, on the railway line connecting Aarau and Arth-Goldau. The station is served by services of the Aargau S-Bahn and the S42 of the Zurich S-Bahn, which is a rush-hour service.

== Schools ==
Bosvil has a primary and secondary school. The district school is in Muri and the Cantonal school is in Wohlen. The entire Swiss population is generally well educated. In Boswil about 72.5% of the population (between age 25 and 64) have completed either non-mandatory upper secondary education or additional higher education (either university or a Fachhochschule). Of the school age population (in the 2008/2009 school year), there are 147 students attending primary school, there are 126 students attending secondary school in the municipality.

== Religion ==
From the 2000 census, 1,609 or 69.7% were Roman Catholic, while 326 or 14.1% belonged to the Swiss Reformed Church. Of the rest of the population, there was 1 individual who belonged to the Christian Catholic faith.

== Culture ==
At the end of the 1880s a new church was established, inaugurated on August 24, 1890. The old church, which had become too small, was later sold including the parsonage building. Since that time the old church has, at regular intervals, held cultural high level meetings, some of which received worldwide attention.

The old parsonage building served first as a home for elderly artists, then later as an area for creative art class participants.
