= Bünzen =

Bünzen may refer to the following places:

in Switzerland

- Bünzen, Aargau, in the Canton of Aargau

in Germany

- Bünzen, Germany, a locality of Aukrug, Schleswig-Holstein
