= Waltenschwil =

- Municipality
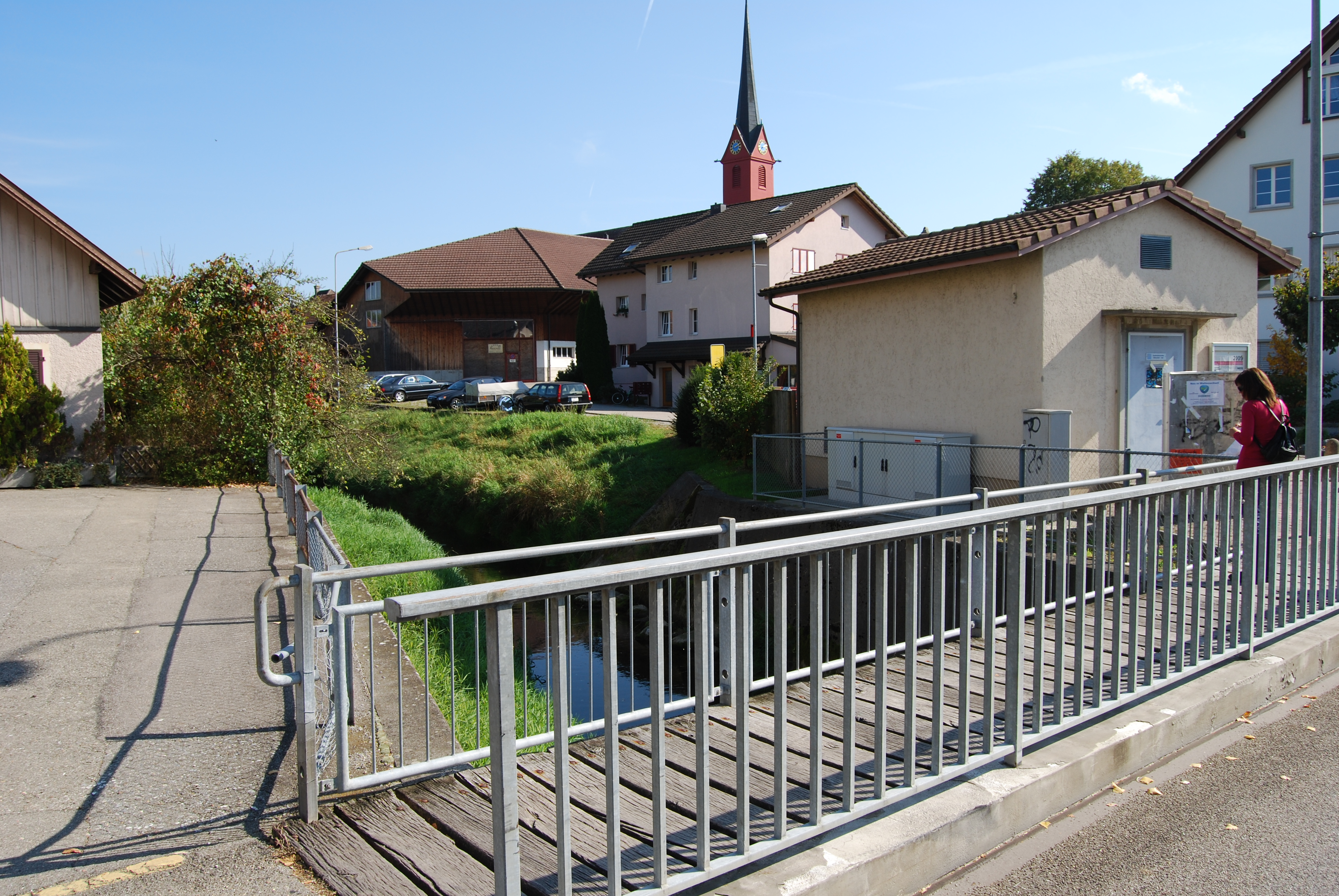

- Flag Coat of arms
- Location of Waltenschwil
- Location within Switzerland Location within Canton of Aargau
- Coordinates: 47°20′N 8°18′E
- Country: Switzerland
- Canton: Aargau
- District: Muri

Area
  - Total: 4.54 km^{2} (1.75 sq mi)
- Elevation: 427 m (1,401 ft)

Population (December 2006)
  - Total: 2,212
  - Density: 487/km^{2} (1,260/sq mi)
- Time zone: UTC+01:00 (CET)
  - Summer (DST): UTC+02:00 (CEST)
- Postal code: 5622
- SFOS number: 4240
- ISO 3166 code: CH-AG
- Surrounded by: Boswil, Bremgarten, Bünzen, Büttikon, Hermetschwil-Staffeln, Kallern, Uezwil, Wohlen
- Website: www.waltenschwil.ch

Waltenschwil is a municipality in the district of Muri in the canton of Aargau in Switzerland.

== Geography ==
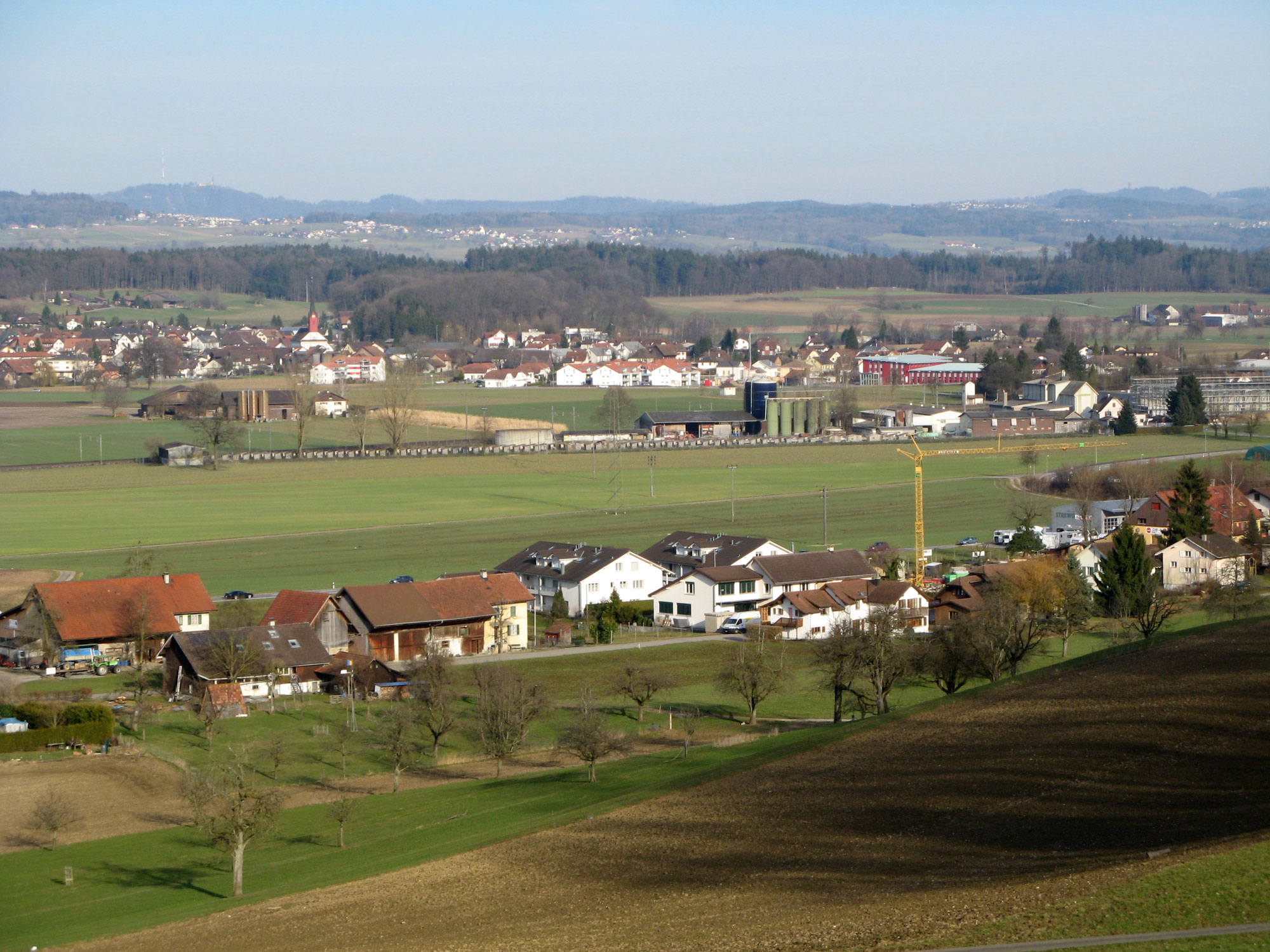
Waltenschwil with the hamlet of Büelisacher in the foreground

Aerial view (1954)

Waltenschwil has an area, as of 2009, of 4.56 square kilometers (1.76 sq mi). Of this area, 2.58 km^{2} (1.00 sq mi) or 56.6% is used for agricultural purposes, while 0.95 km^{2} (0.37 sq mi) or 20.8% is forested. Of the rest of the land, 1.03 km^{2} (0.40 sq mi) or 22.6% is settled (buildings or roads), 0.02 km^{2} (4.9 acres) or 0.4% is either rivers or lakes.

Of the built up area, industrial buildings made up 3.1% of the total area while housing and buildings made up 12.5% and transportation infrastructure made up 4.8%. while parks, green belts and sports fields made up 1.3%. Out of the forested land, 19.5% of the total land area is heavily forested and 1.3% is covered with orchards or small clusters of trees. Of the agricultural land, 45.4% is used for growing crops and 11.0% is pastures. All the water in the municipality is in rivers and streams.

== Coat of arms ==
The blazon of the municipal coat of arms is Azure a Crescent increscent between four Mullets of Five Argent one in dexter and three in sinister in pale.

== Demographics ==
Waltenschwil has a population (as of December 2020) of 3,053. As of June 2009, 9.5% of the population are foreign nationals. Over the last 10 years (1997–2007) the population has changed at a rate of 13.4%. Most of the population (as of 2000) speaks German (95.7%), with Italian being second most common (0.9%) and Albanian being third (0.7%).

The age distribution, as of 2008, in Waltenschwil is; 288 children or 12.1% of the population are between 0 and 9 years old and 335 teenagers or 14.0% are between 10 and 19. Of the adult population, 261 people or 10.9% of the population are between 20 and 29 years old. 313 people or 13.1% are between 30 and 39, 462 people or 19.4% are between 40 and 49, and 339 people or 14.2% are between 50 and 59. The senior population distribution is 207 people or 8.7% of the population are between 60 and 69 years old, 130 people or 5.4% are between 70 and 79, there are 49 people or 2.1% who are between 80 and 89, and there are 2 people or 0.1% who are 90 and older.

As of 2000, there were 49 homes with 1 or 2 persons in the household, 327 homes with 3 or 4 persons in the household, and 389 homes with 5 or more persons in the household. As of 2000, there were 775 private households (homes and apartments) in the municipality, and an average of 2.6 persons per household. In 2008 there were 501 single family homes (or 49.5% of the total) out of a total of 1,013 homes and apartments. There were a total of 16 empty apartments for a 1.6% vacancy rate. As of 2007, the construction rate of new housing units was 15.4 new units per 1000 residents.

In the 2007 federal election the most popular party was the SVP which received 36% of the vote. The next three most popular parties were the CVP (22.2%), the SP (17.2%) and the FDP (9.9%).

The historical population is given in the following table:

Historical population
Year	Pop.	±%
1975	1,166	—
1980	1,207	+3.5%
1990	1,727	+43.1%
2000	2,038	+18.0%

== Economy ==
As of 2007, Waltenschwil had an unemployment rate of 1.82%. As of 2005, there were 59 people employed in the primary economic sector and about 19 businesses involved in this sector. 66 people are employed in the secondary sector and there are 21 businesses in this sector. 379 people are employed in the tertiary sector, with 76 businesses in this sector.

In 2000 there were 1,130 workers who lived in the municipality. Of these, 907 or about 80.3% of the residents worked outside Waltenschwil while 183 people commuted into the municipality for work. There were a total of 406 jobs (of at least 6 hours per week) in the municipality. Of the working population, 8.8% used public transportation to get to work, and 65.8% used a private car.

== Religion ==
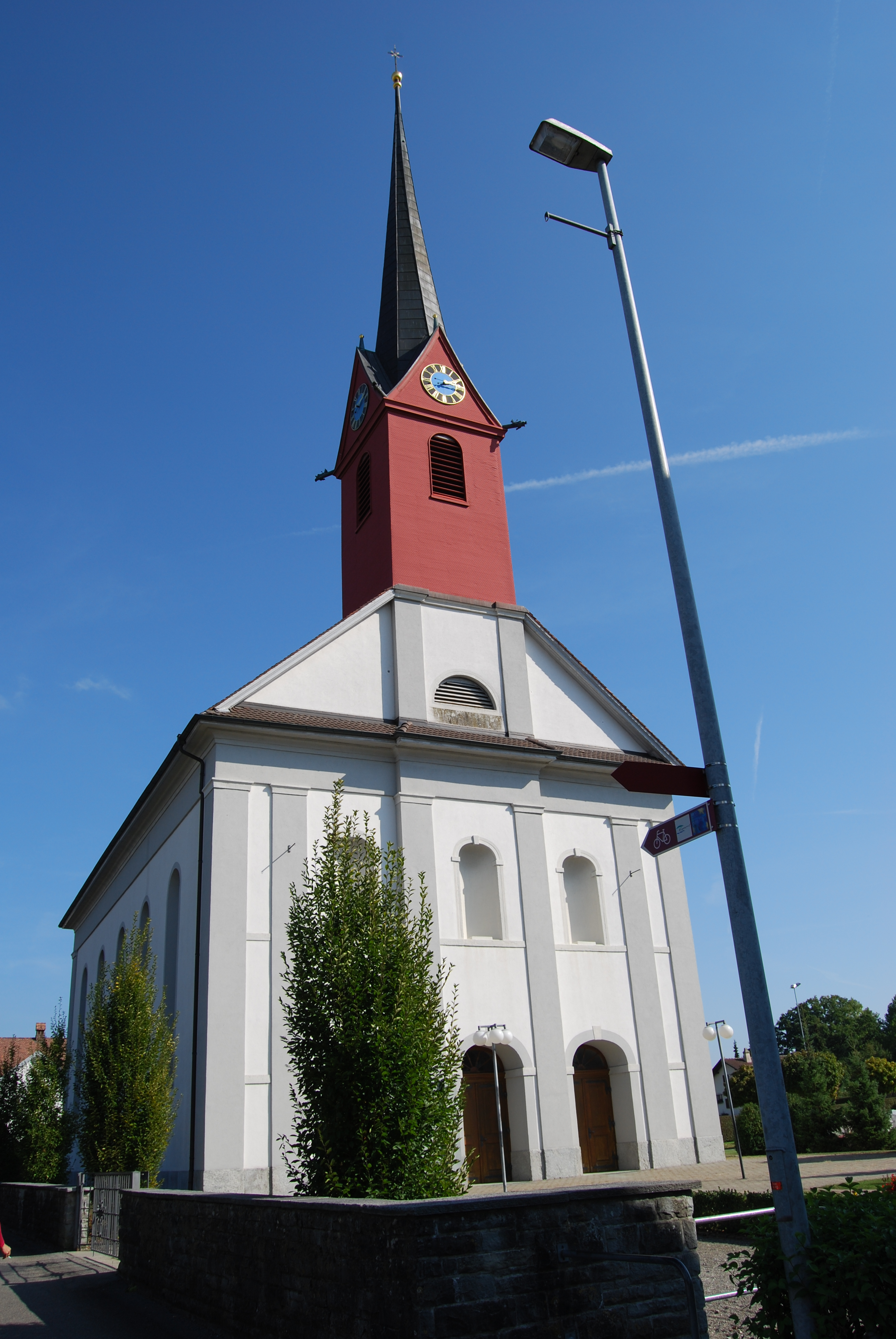
Village church of Waltenschwil

From the 2000 census, 1,273 or 62.7% were Roman Catholic, while 478 or 23.6% belonged to the Swiss Reformed Church. Of the rest of the population, there was 1 individual who belonged to the Christian Catholic faith.

== Education ==
In Waltenschwil about 82.3% of the population (between age 25–64) have completed either non-mandatory upper secondary education or additional higher education (either university or a Fachhochschule). Of the school age population (in the 2008/2009 school year), there are 227 students attending primary school in the municipality.
