= Bettwil =

- Municipality
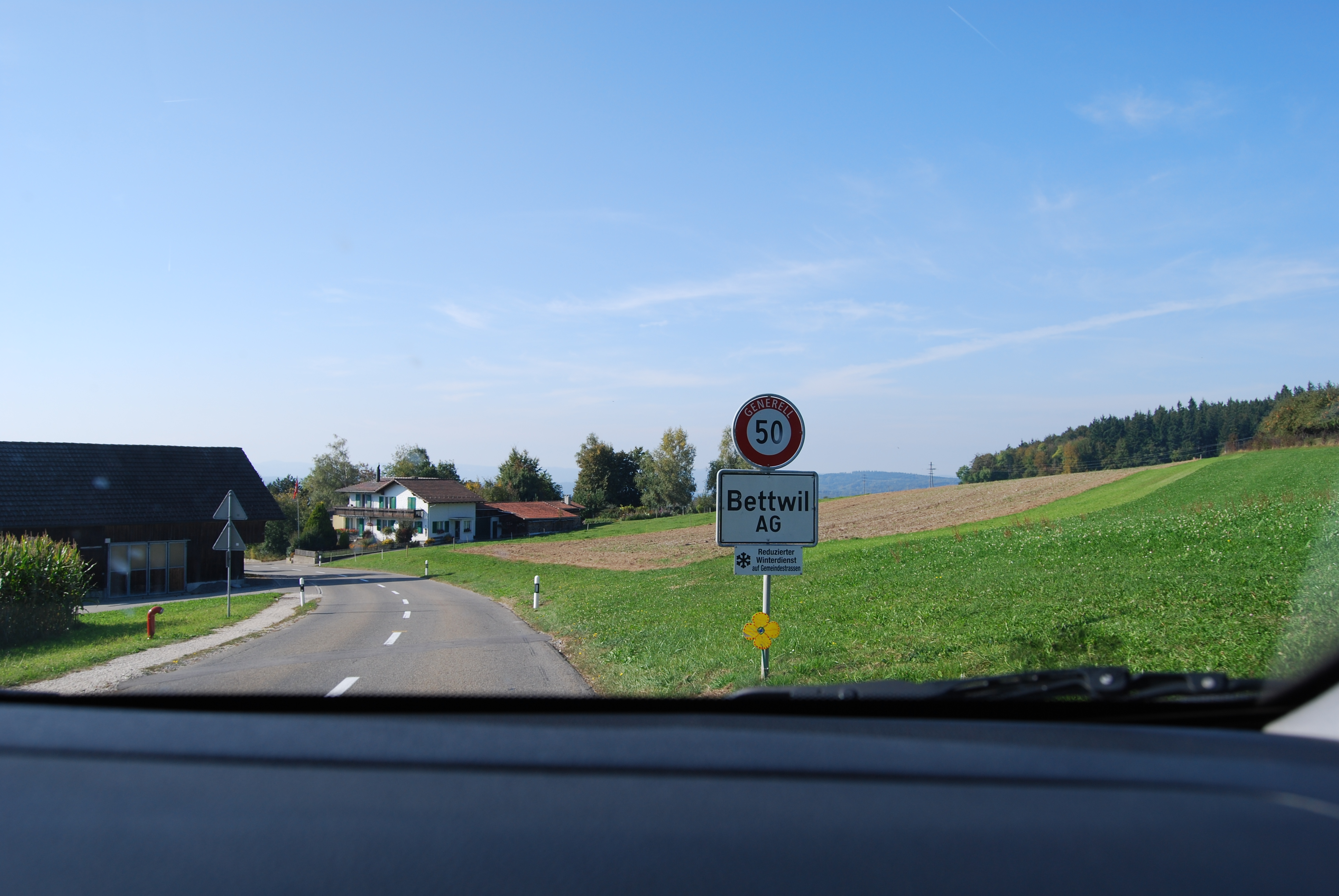

- Flag Coat of arms
- Location of Bettwil
- Location within Switzerland Location within Canton of Aargau
- Coordinates: 47°18′N 8°16′E
- Country: Switzerland
- Canton: Aargau
- District: Muri

Area
  - Total: 4.25 km^{2} (1.64 sq mi)
- Elevation: 688 m (2,257 ft)

Population (December 2020)
  - Total: 654
  - Density: 154/km^{2} (399/sq mi)
- Time zone: UTC+01:00 (CET)
  - Summer (DST): UTC+02:00 (CEST)
- Postal code: 5618
- SFOS number: 4227
- ISO 3166 code: CH-AG
- Surrounded by: Boswil, Buttwil, Fahrwangen, Kallern, Sarmenstorf, Schongau (LU)
- Website: https://www.bettwil.ch SFSO statistics

Bettwil (German pronunciation: [ˈbɛtˌviːl]) is a municipality in the district of Muri in the canton of Aargau in Switzerland.

== History ==
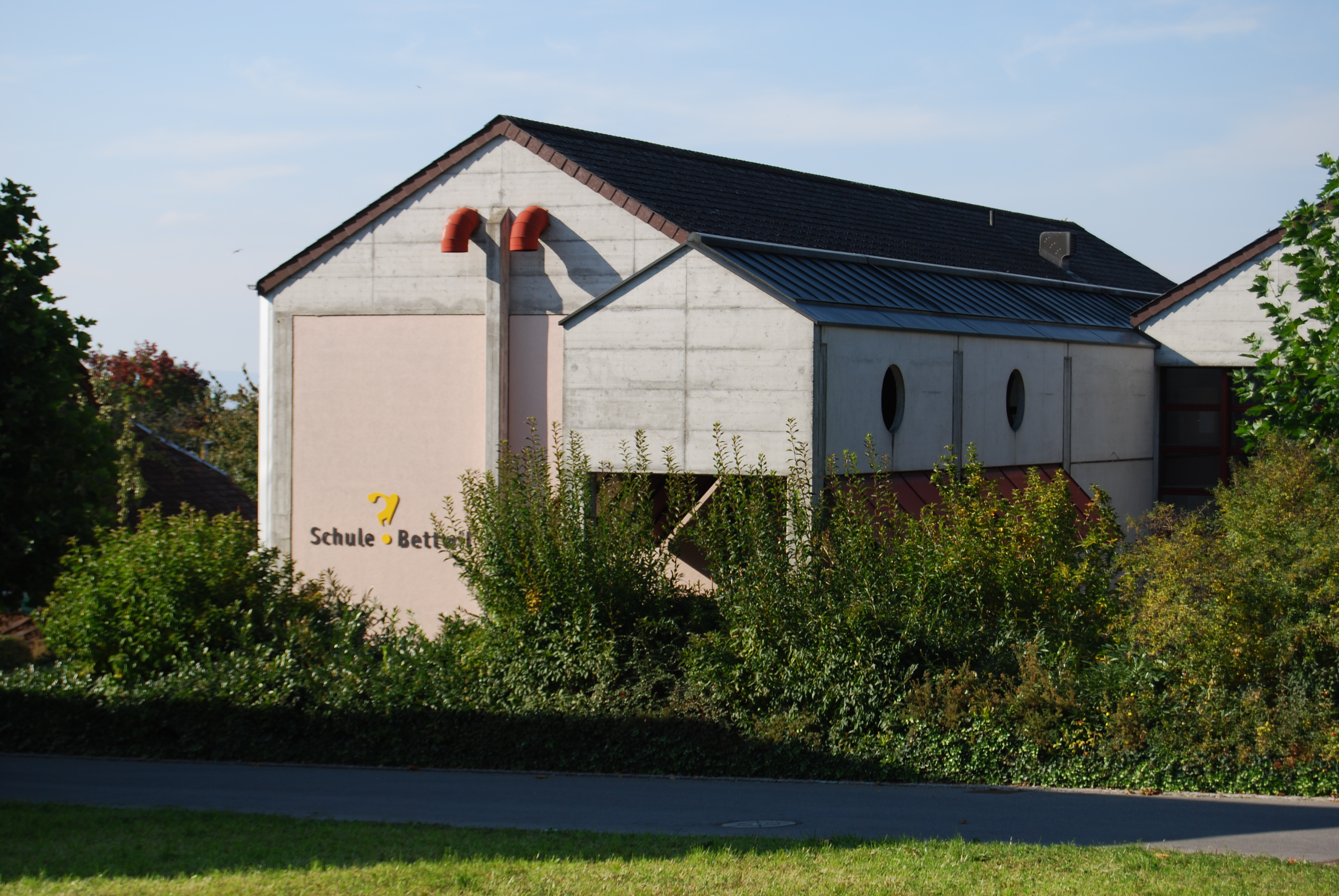
Village school

Aerial view (1949)

The first traces of human settlement are some scattered, Roman era artifacts. The modern municipality of Bettwil is first mentioned in 924 as Petiwilare. The tithes of the village were split between Einsiedeln Abbey and the hospital in Bremgarten. From 1200 until 1412, when it was used to pay a ransom, it was in the possession of the Lords of Heidegg. The current municipal borders were set in 1415 when it came under Swiss Confederation control. The village of law of 1547 confirmed the right of free choice of deputy vogt and all the village officials. Since 1770 there is a village school.

Until 1799 it was part of the Sarmenstorf church parish, then it became an independent parish. The Chapel of St. Othmar, was inaugurated in 1496 and demolished in 1789. It was replaced by the Church of St. Joseph.

Agriculture remains important (in 1990, 35% of the local workers were employed in agriculture). The opening up of land in 1981 led to an increase in the population. In 1988, a regional bus connection was established, and by 1990, 61% of the working population commuted outside the municipality.

== Geography ==
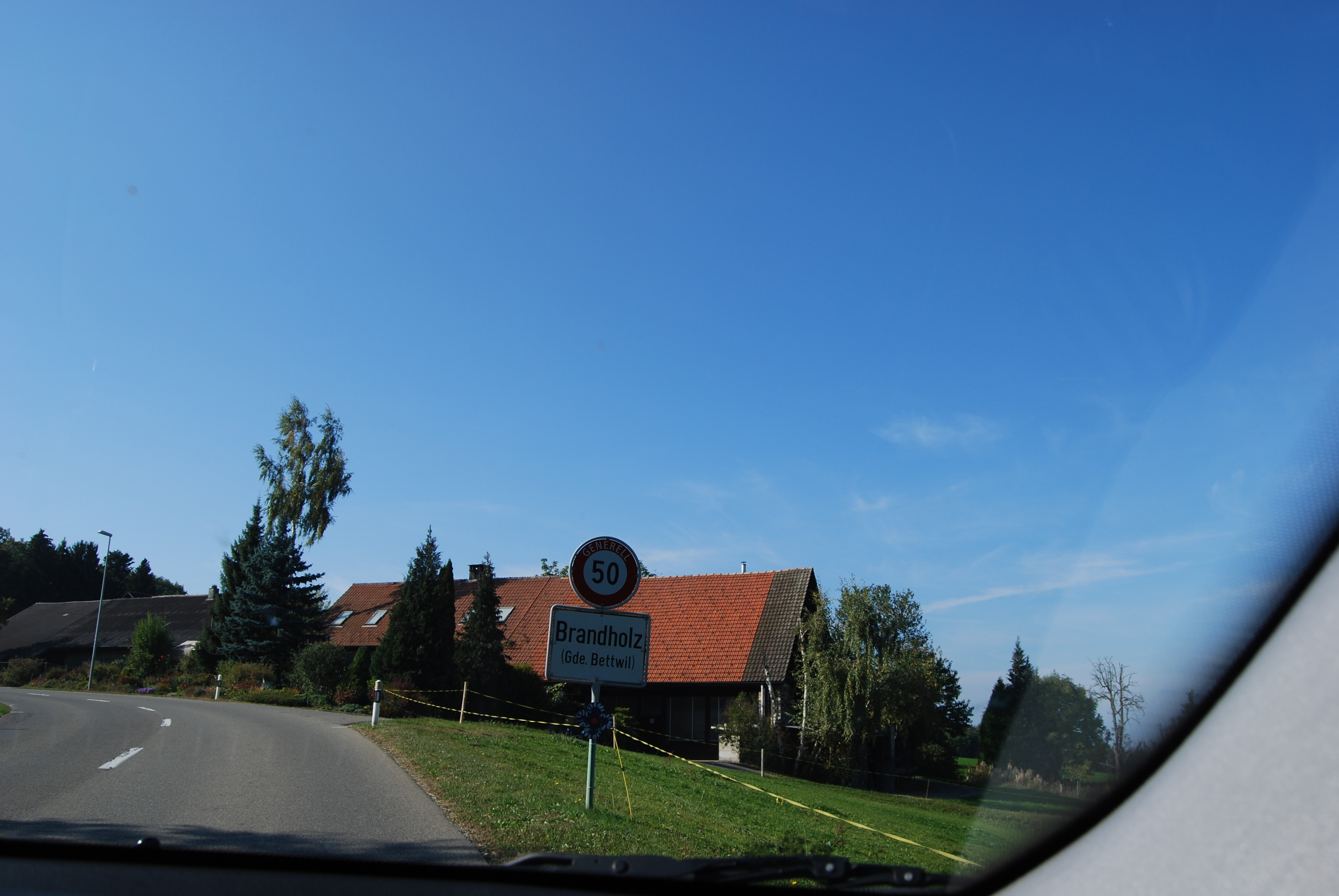
Brandholz village in Bettwil

Bettwil has an area, as of 2009, of 4.25 square kilometers (1.64 sq mi). Of this area, 2.93 km^{2} (1.13 sq mi) or 68.9% is used for agricultural purposes, while 0.91 km^{2} (0.35 sq mi) or 21.4% is forested. Of the rest of the land, 0.41 km^{2} (0.16 sq mi) or 9.6% is settled (buildings or roads) and 0.01 km^{2} (2.5 acres) or 0.2% is unproductive land.

Of the built up area, housing and buildings made up 5.4% and transportation infrastructure made up 4.0%. Out of the forested land, all of the forested land area is covered with heavy forests. Of the agricultural land, 51.1% is used for growing crops and 15.8% is pastures, while 2.1% is used for orchards or vine crops.

The municipality is located in the Muri district, on the western slope of the Lindenberg. It consists of the linear village of Bettwil and the hamlets of Brandholz, Guggibad and Königsberg.

== Coat of arms ==
The blazon of the municipal coat of arms is Argent three Pine-trees Vert trunked Gules issuant from Coupeaux of the second.

== Demographics ==
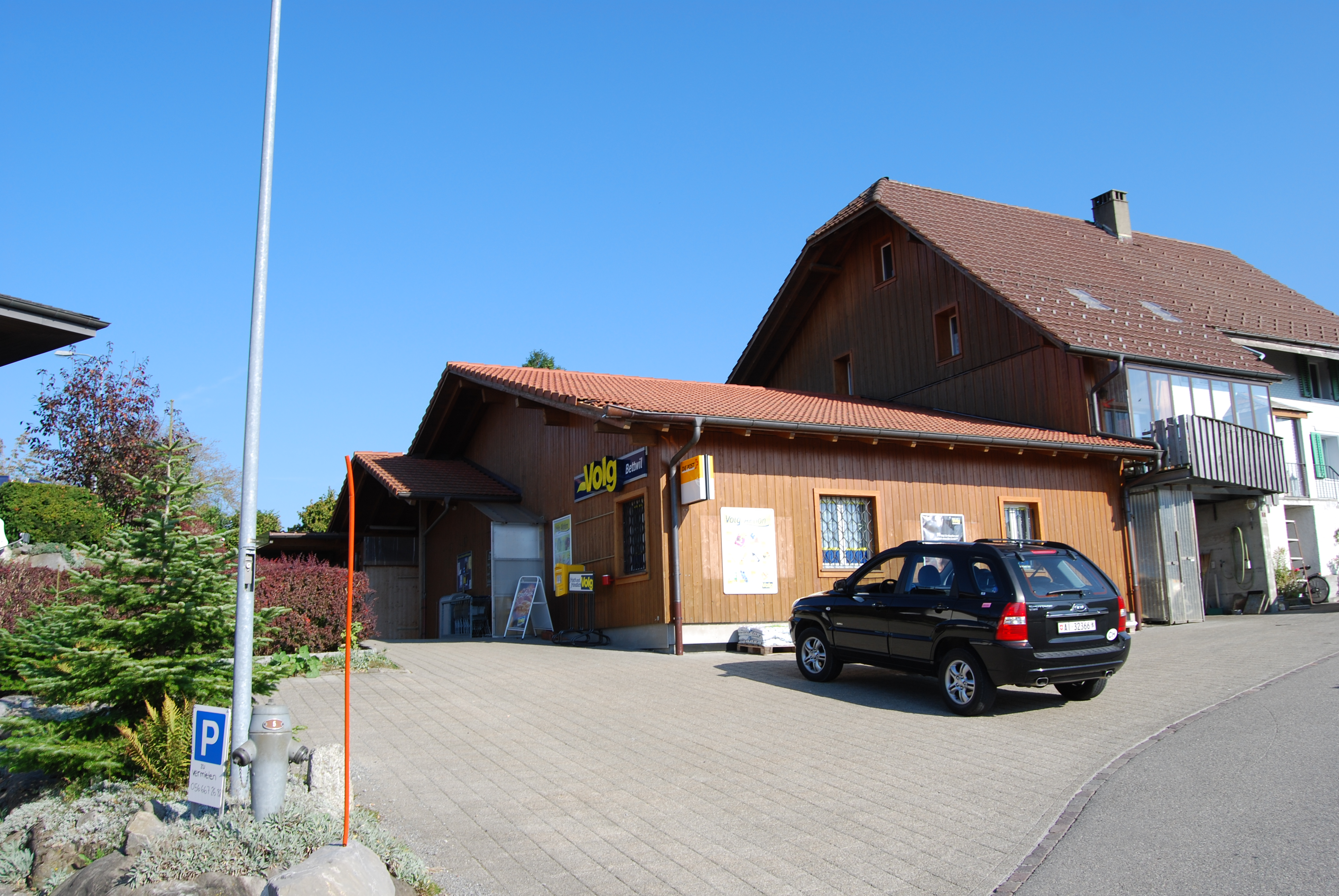
Village store and post office

Bettwil has a population (as of December 2020) of 654. As of June 2009, 8.5% of the population are foreign nationals. Over the last 10 years (1997–2007) the population has changed at a rate of -1.6%. Most of the population (as of 2000) speaks German (97.6%), with English being second most common ( 0.9%) and French being third ( 0.5%).

The age distribution, as of 2008, in Bettwil is; 52 children or 9.3% of the population are between 0 and 9 years old and 84 teenagers or 15.0% are between 10 and 19. Of the adult population, 57 people or 10.2% of the population are between 20 and 29 years old. 71 people or 12.7% are between 30 and 39, 118 people or 21.0% are between 40 and 49, and 80 people or 14.3% are between 50 and 59. The senior population distribution is 51 people or 9.1% of the population are between 60 and 69 years old, 35 people or 6.2% are between 70 and 79, there are 9 people or 1.6% who are between 80 and 89, and there are 4 people or 0.7% who are 90 and older.

As of 2000 the average number of residents per living room was 0.59 which is about equal to the cantonal average of 0.57 per room. In this case, a room is defined as space of a housing unit of at least 4 m^{2} (43 sq ft) as normal bedrooms, dining rooms, living rooms, kitchens and habitable cellars and attics. About 58.5% of the total households were owner occupied, or in other words did not pay rent (though they may have a mortgage or a rent-to-own agreement).

As of 2000, there were 11 homes with 1 or 2 persons in the household, 74 homes with 3 or 4 persons in the household, and 108 homes with 5 or more persons in the household. As of 2000, there were 199 private households (homes and apartments) in the municipality, and an average of 2.8 persons per household. In 2008 there were 95 single family homes (or 40.8% of the total) out of a total of 233 homes and apartments. There were a total of 0 empty apartments for a 0.0% vacancy rate. As of 2007, the construction rate of new housing units was 17.7 new units per 1000 residents.

In the 2007 federal election the most popular party was the SVP which received 46.2% of the vote. The next three most popular parties were the CVP (24.2%), the FDP (8.1%) and the Other (6.9%).

The historical population is given in the following table:

Historical population
Year	Pop.	±%
1850	421	—
1900	400	−5.0%
1950	414	+3.5%
1980	376	−9.2%
2000	576	+53.2%

== Economy ==
As of 2007, Bettwil had an unemployment rate of 0.61%. As of 2005, there were 53 people employed in the primary economic sector and about 20 businesses involved in this sector. 63 people are employed in the secondary sector and there are 4 businesses in this sector. 56 people are employed in the tertiary sector, with 15 businesses in this sector.

In 2000 there were 302 workers who lived in the municipality. Of these, 232 or about 76.8% of the residents worked outside Bettwil while 70 people commuted into the municipality for work. There were a total of 140 jobs (of at least 6 hours per week) in the municipality. Of the working population, 3.6% used public transportation to get to work, and 60.5% used a private car.

== Religion ==
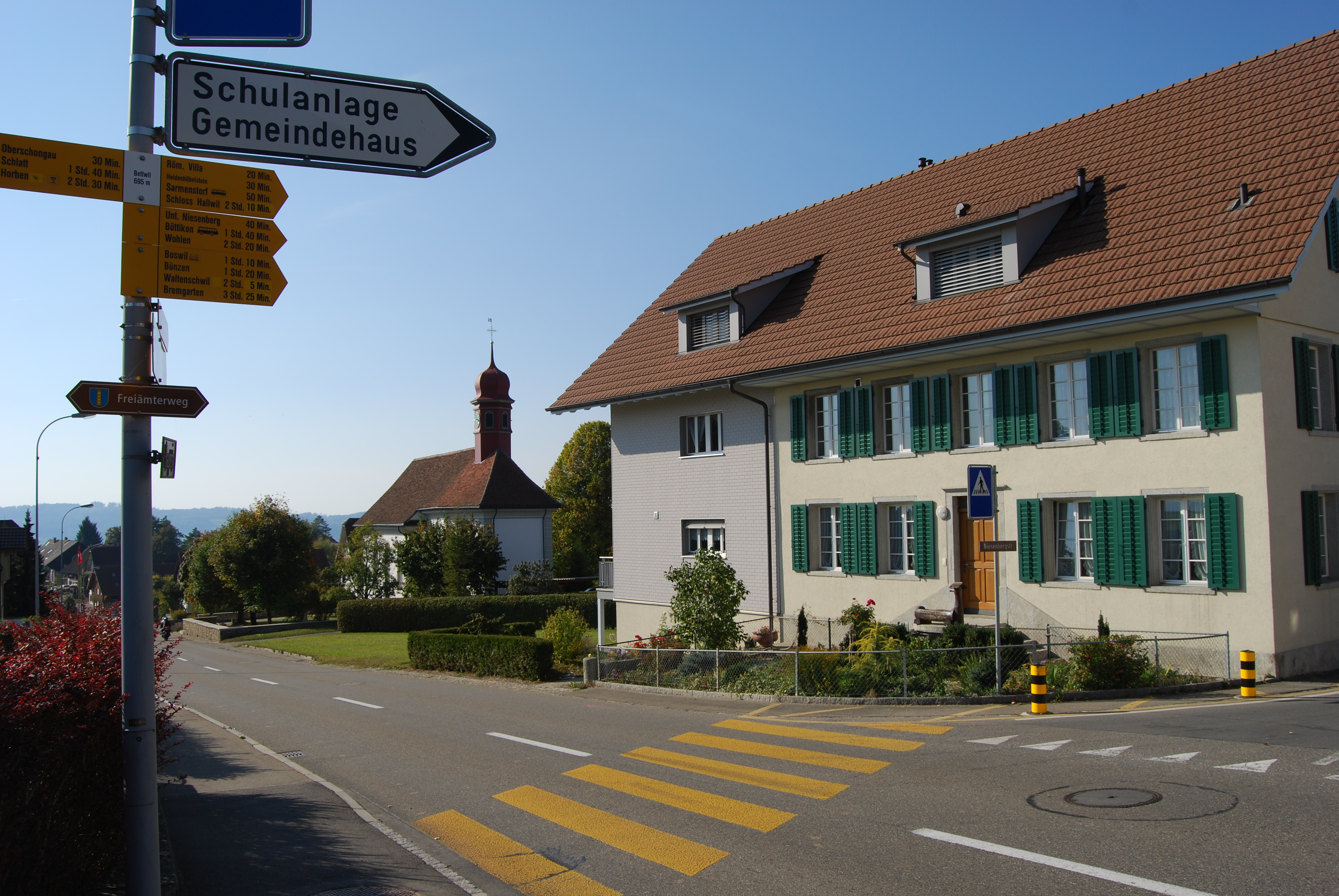
Village church

From the 2000 census, 389 or 67.5% were Roman Catholic, while 122 or 21.2% belonged to the Swiss Reformed Church.

== Education ==
The entire Swiss population is generally well educated. In Bettwil about 75.5% of the population (between age 25-64) have completed either non-mandatory upper secondary education or additional higher education (either university or a Fachhochschule). Of the school age population (in the 2008/2009 school year), there are 30 students attending primary school in the municipality.
