= Hermetschwil-Staffeln =

- Former municipality
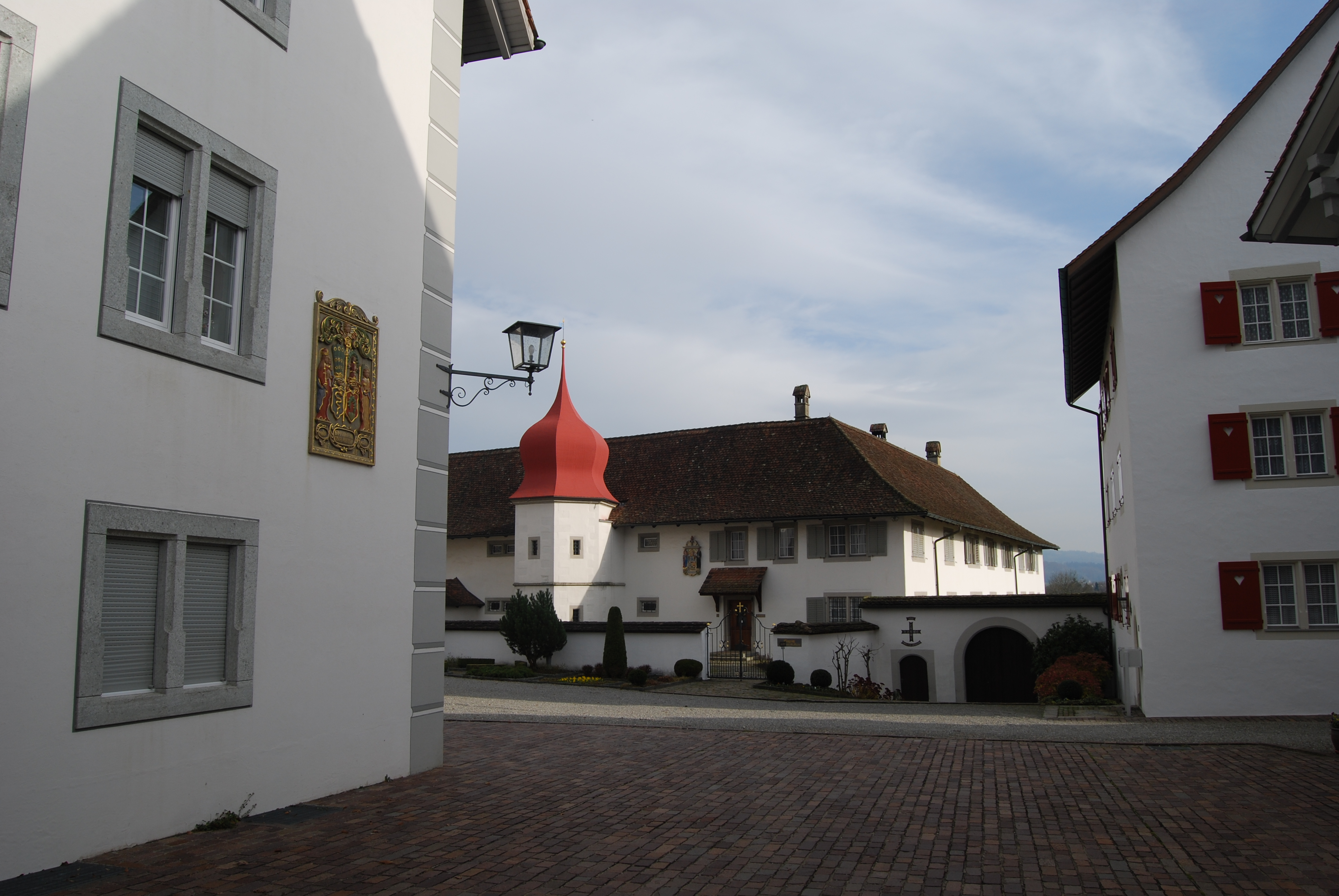

- Flag Coat of arms
- Location of Hermetschwil-Staffeln
- Location within Switzerland Location within Canton of Aargau
- Coordinates: 47°20′N 8°21′E
- Country: Switzerland
- Canton: Aargau
- District: Bremgarten

Area
  - Total: 3.34 km^{2} (1.29 sq mi)
- Elevation: 406 m (1,332 ft)

Population (Dec 2011)
  - Total: 1,126
  - Density: 337/km^{2} (873/sq mi)
- Time zone: UTC+01:00 (CET)
  - Summer (DST): UTC+02:00 (CEST)
- Postal code: 5626
- SFOS number: 4069
- ISO 3166 code: CH-AG
- Surrounded by: Besenbüren, Bremgarten, Bünzen, Rottenschwil, Unterlunkhofen, Waltenschwil, Zufikon
- Website: www.hermetschwil.ch

Hermetschwil-Staffeln is a former municipality in the district of Bremgarten in the canton of Aargau in Switzerland. On 1 January 2014 the former municipality of Hermetschwil-Staffeln merged into the municipality of Bremgarten.

Aerial view (1947)

== History ==
Hermetschwil-Staffeln is first mentioned in 1064 as Hermenswil. In 1390 it was mentioned as Hermeczwil. The village grew up around Hermetschwil Convent. While the region was under Austrian control, the village was under the authority of the town of Muri. Muri Abbey owned farms, a tavern, the mill, the ferry and the parish church in Hermetschwil. The low court was under the abbot of Muri Abbey, while the high court was under Habsburg control until 1415. After the conquest of Aargau by Bern, Hermetschwil was part of the independent Krummamt.

The Convent church always served as a parish church. In 1878 the Convent was dissolved and the Convent's farm became the orphanage of St. Benedict.

For most of its history Hermetschwil-Staffeln was a quiet farming village. In the 1960s it became part of the agglomeration of Zurich and the population increased. By the 1980s a number of new housing developments were built for the growing population.

== Geography ==
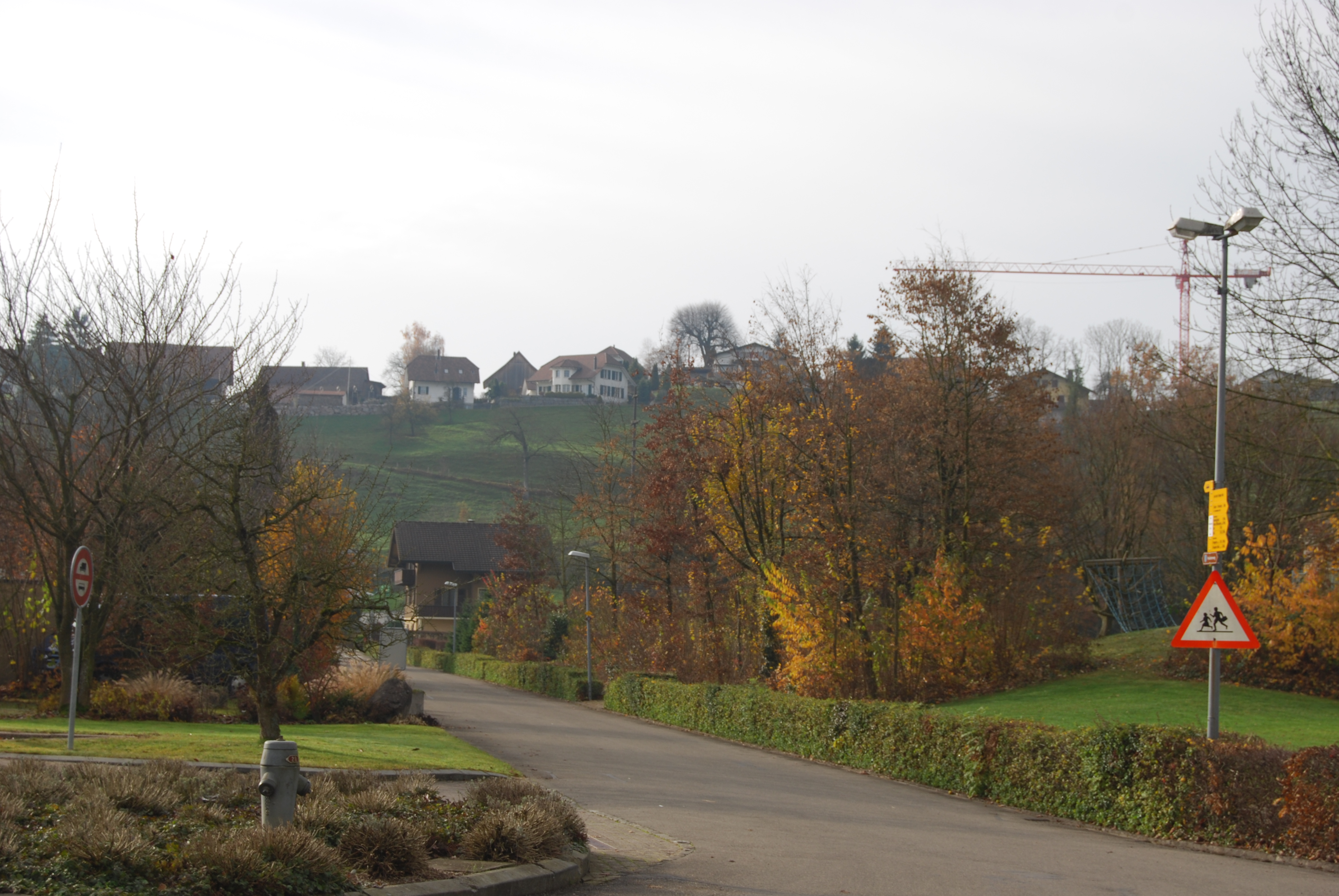
Hermetschwil village

Before the merger, Hermetschwil-Staffeln had a total area of 3.3 km^{2} (1.3 mi^{2}). Of this area, 54.2% is used for agricultural purposes, while 31.1% is forested. Of the rest of the land, 10.2% is settled (buildings or roads) and the remainder (4.5%) is non-productive (rivers or lakes).

The municipality is located in the Bremgarten district, on a moraine hill on the left bank of the Reuss river. It consists of the villages of Hermetschwil along the river and Staffeln in the hills above the river. The village of Hermetschwil-Staffeln is situated outside of Bremgarten, about a 5 min drive away. Bremgarten is also connected to the village by bus number 339.

== Coat of arms ==
The blazon of the municipal coat of arms is Azure an Asp crowned Or.

== Demographics ==
Hermetschwil-Staffeln had a population (as of 2011) of 1,126. As of 2008, 9.7% of the population was made up of foreign nationals. Over the last 10 years the population has grown at a rate of 12.4%. Most of the population (as of 2000) speaks German (96.0%), with Italian being second most common ( 1.3%) and French being third ( 0.7%). The age distribution, as of 2008, in Hermetschwil-Staffeln is; 111 children or 10.0% of the population are between 0 and 9 years old and 180 teenagers or 16.2% are between 10 and 19. Of the adult population, 110 people or 9.9% of the population are between 20 and 29 years old. 153 people or 13.8% are between 30 and 39, 258 people or 23.3% are between 40 and 49, and 138 people or 12.4% are between 50 and 59. The senior population distribution is 83 people or 7.5% of the population are between 60 and 69 years old, 46 people or 4.1% are between 70 and 79, there are 28 people or 2.5% who are between 80 and 89, and there are 2 people or 0.2% who are 90 and older.

As of 2000, there were 31 homes with 1 or 2 persons in the household, 135 homes with 3 or 4 persons in the household, and 155 homes with 5 or more persons in the household. The average number of people per household was 2.72 individuals. In 2008 there were 180 single family homes (or 42.8% of the total) out of a total of 421 homes and apartments. There were a total of 0 empty apartments and a 0.0% vacancy rate. As of 2007, the construction rate of new housing units was 3.7 new units per 1000 residents.

In the 2007 federal election the most popular party was the SVP which received 44.4% of the vote. The next three most popular parties were the CVP (24.5%), the SP (12.9%) and the FDP (8.1%).

In Hermetschwil-Staffeln about 86.2% of the population (between age 25-64) have completed either non-mandatory upper secondary education or additional higher education (either university or a Fachhochschule). Of the school age population (in the 2008/2009 school year), there are 102 students attending primary school in the municipality.

The historical population is given in the following table:

Historical population
Year	Pop.	±%
1850	346	—
1900	389	+12.4%
1950	379	−2.6%
1980	498	+31.4%
2000	1,087	+118.3%

== Heritage sites of national significance ==
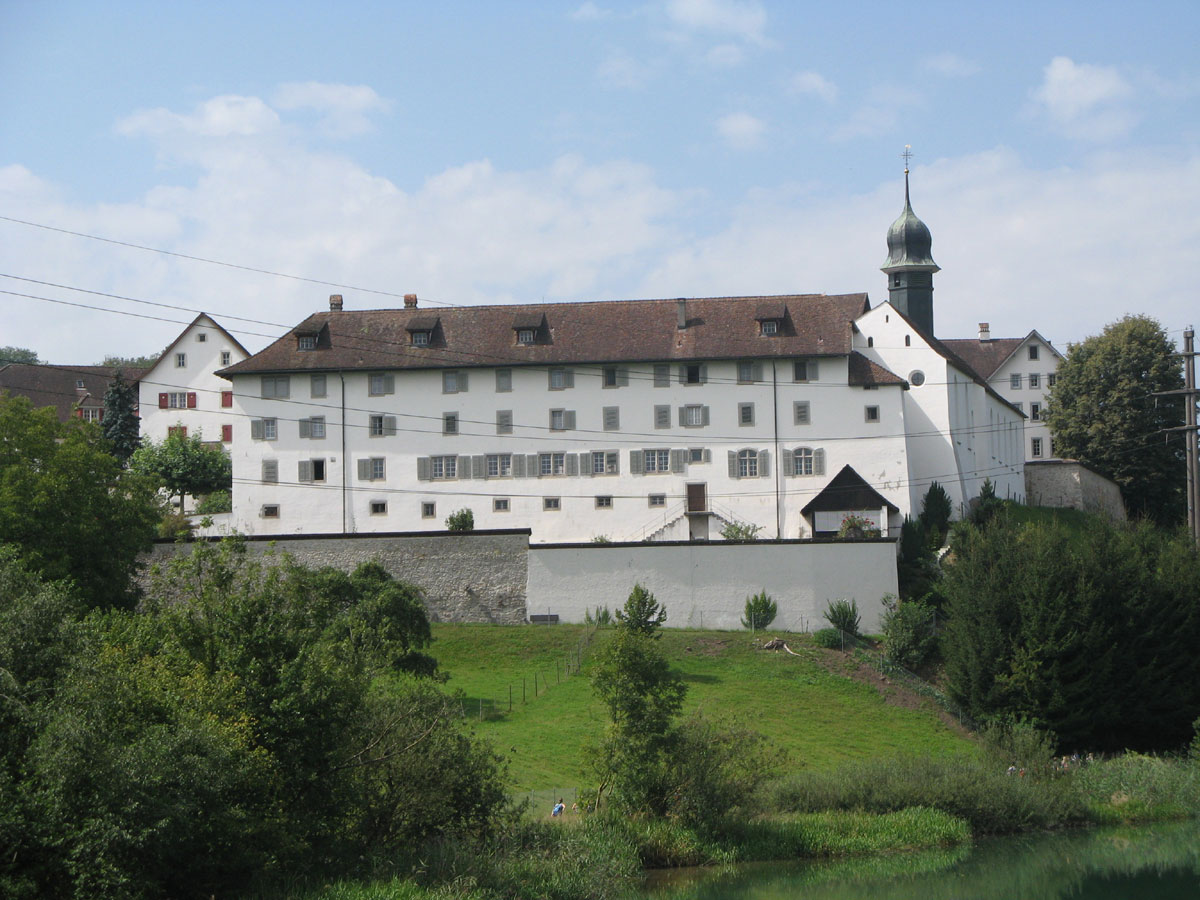
Hermetschwil Convent

The Benedictine Convent of St. Martin, and the former Gasthaus (hotel-restaurant) at Dorfstrasse 9 are listed as Swiss heritage sites of national significance.

== Economy ==
Until January 2009 there was a Volg supermarket in the village which had to close because of insufficient funding and a mistake with the change of ownership, it was scheduled to re-open during April 2009. The local "Gemeindehaus", a Raiffeisen ATM and a local primary school and kindergarten are the services that can be found in the village. Numerous apartment buildings are being built, which will provide more space for future residents.

As of 2007, Hermetschwil-Staffeln had an unemployment rate of 1.99%. As of 2005, there were 24 people employed in the primary economic sector and about 10 businesses involved in this sector. 73 people are employed in the secondary sector and there are 9 businesses in this sector. 125 people are employed in the tertiary sector, with 20 businesses in this sector.

As of 2000 there were 584 total workers who lived in the municipality. Of these, 494 or about 84.6% of the residents worked outside Hermetschwil-Staffeln while 96 people commuted into the municipality for work. There were a total of 186 jobs (of at least 6 hours per week) in the municipality. Of the working population, 7.9% used public transportation to get to work, and 65.3% used a private car.

== Religion ==
From the 2000 census, 603 or 55.5% were Roman Catholic, while 310 or 28.5% belonged to the Swiss Reformed Church. Of the rest of the population, there were 2 individuals (or about 0.18% of the population) who belonged to the Christian Catholic faith.
