= Kallern =

- Municipality
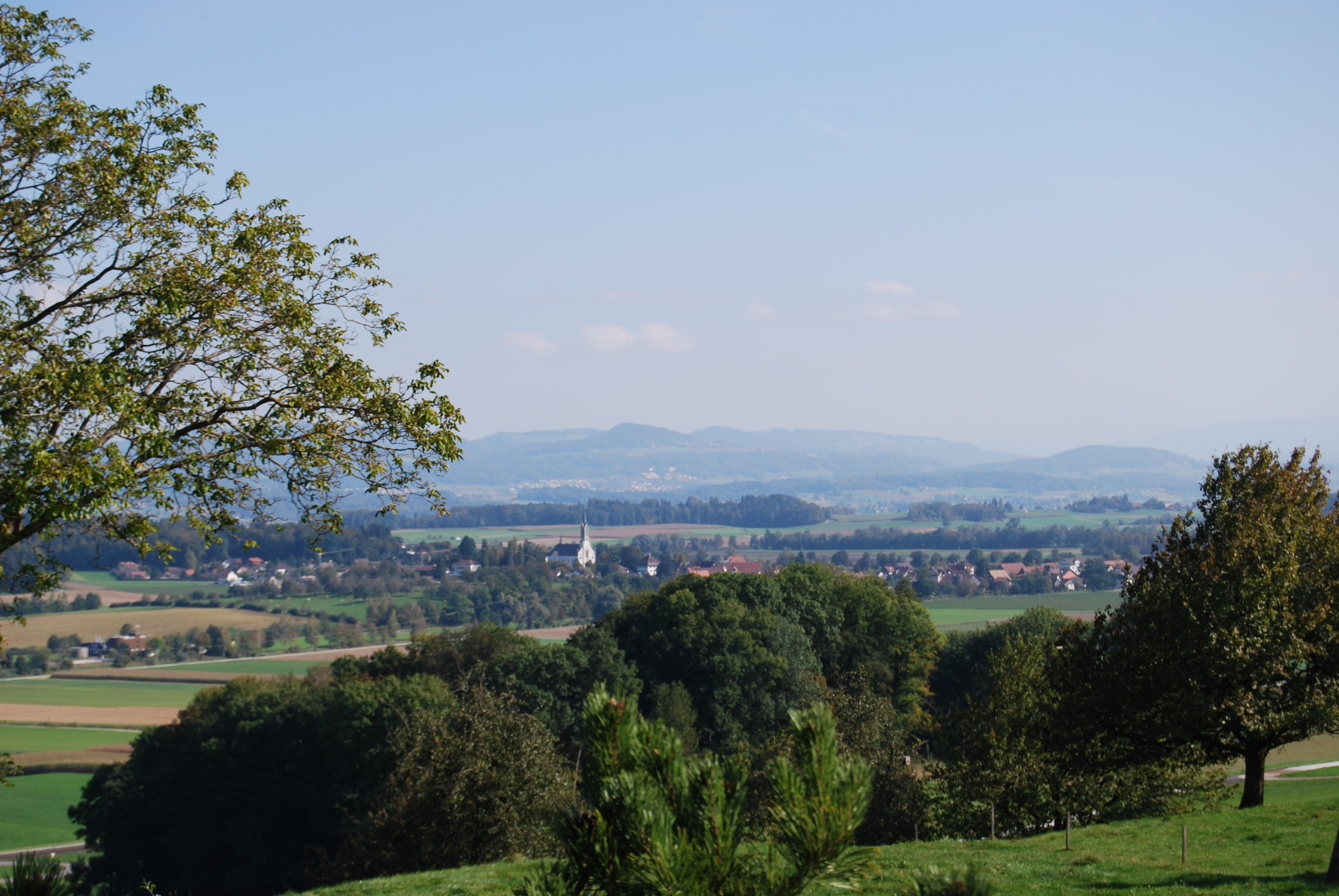

- Flag Coat of arms
- Location of Kallern
- Location within Switzerland Location within Canton of Aargau
- Coordinates: 47°19′N 8°18′E
- Country: Switzerland
- Canton: Aargau
- District: Muri

Area
  - Total: 2.68 km^{2} (1.03 sq mi)
- Elevation: 513 m (1,683 ft)

Population (December 2006)
  - Total: 304
  - Density: 113/km^{2} (294/sq mi)
- Time zone: UTC+01:00 (CET)
  - Summer (DST): UTC+02:00 (CEST)
- Postal code: 5625
- SFOS number: 4233
- ISO 3166 code: CH-AG
- Surrounded by: Bettwil, Boswil, Sarmenstorf, Uezwil, Waltenschwil
- Website: www.kallern.ch

Kallern is a municipality in the district of Muri in the canton of Aargau in Switzerland.

== History ==
Kallern is first mentioned around 1303-08 as Kaltherren. During the Late Middle Ages, the major landowners in Kallern were Muri Abbey and Hilfikon. After 1415, the village belonged to Muri. Then, after 1435 it belonged to the district of Boswil in the Freie Ämter. Under the Helvetic Republic it was part of the Canton of Baden. Kallern, Ober- and Unterhöll and Uezwil formed a collective community. Niesenberg was connected to Bettwil. The Act of Mediation in 1803 led to the current community. In 1962, a chapel was built in Oberniesenberg, and in 1975 a school and multipurpose room were finished. In 1969, electric street lights came to the village and in 1970, a central water supply was added. In 1980 Hinterbühl was developed as a residential area, and in 1984 it was connected to the sewage treatment plant at Bünzen. In 2000 a quarter of the economically active population worked in agriculture and two thirds were commuters. At the beginning of the 21st Century Kallern possessed neither public transportation or shops.

Kallern, except for the hamlet of Oberniesenberg, belongs to the parish of Boswil-Kellern.

== Geography ==
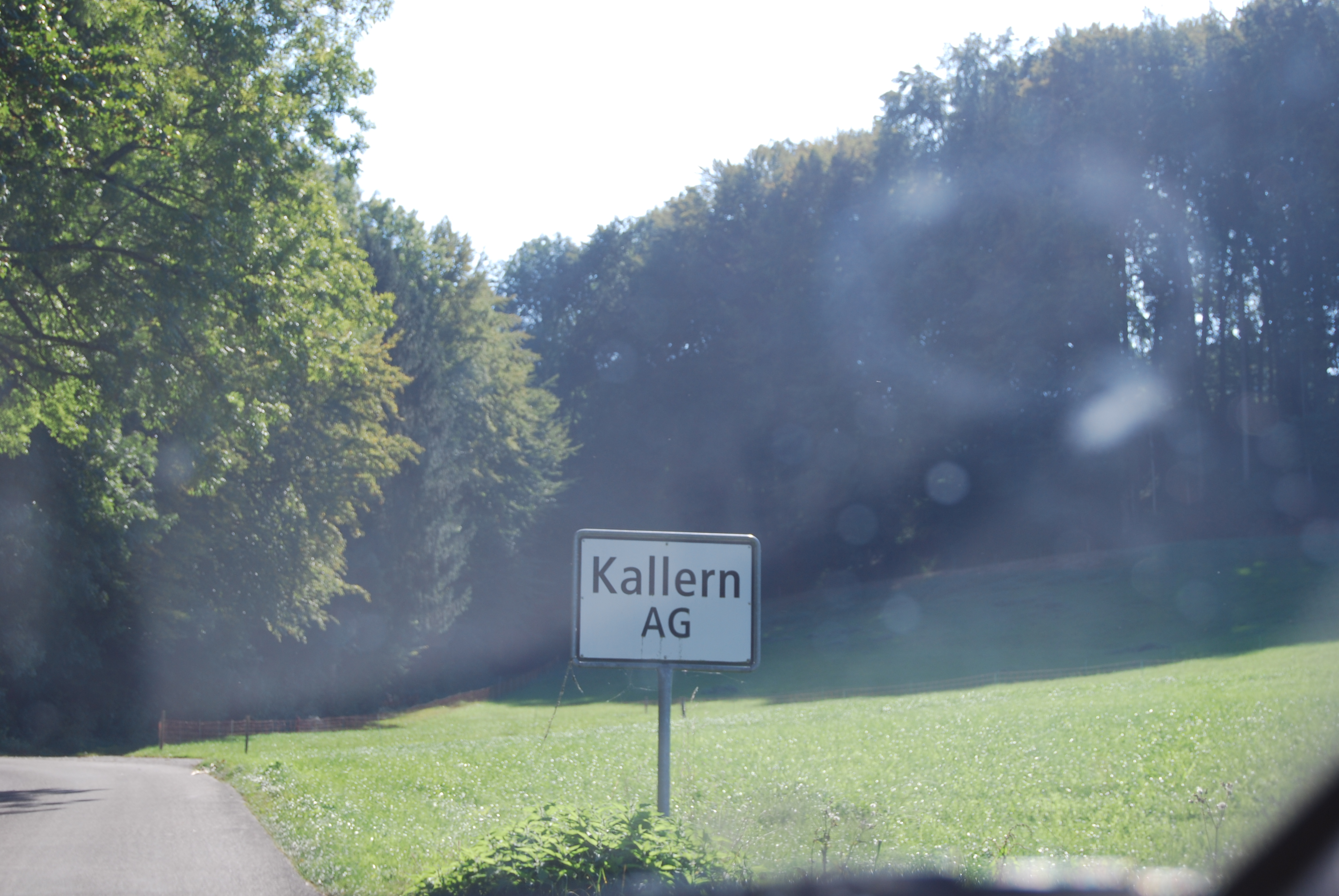
Entrance to Kallern municipality

Kallern has an area, as of 2009, of 2.68 square kilometers (1.03 sq mi). Of this area, 2.08 km^{2} (0.80 sq mi) or 77.6% is used for agricultural purposes, while 0.36 km^{2} (0.14 sq mi) or 13.4% is forested. Of the rest of the land, 0.25 km^{2} (0.097 sq mi) or 9.3% is settled (buildings or roads).

Of the built up area, housing and buildings made up 4.9% and transportation infrastructure made up 4.5%. Out of the forested land, 11.6% of the total land area is heavily forested and 1.9% is covered with orchards or small clusters of trees. Of the agricultural land, 42.9% is used for growing crops and 32.1% is pastures, while 2.6% is used for orchards or vine crops.

The municipality is located in the Muri district, on the eastern slope of the Lindenberg. It consists of the hamlets of Kallern, Bugler, Hinterbühl, Unter-, Hinter- and Oberniesenberg as well as the farm houses of Unter- and Oberhöll, Husmatten and Badhof and other scattered individual houses.

== Coat of arms ==
The blazon of the municipal coat of arms is Azure two Keys Argent in Saltire and in chief a Nail of the same.

== Demographics ==
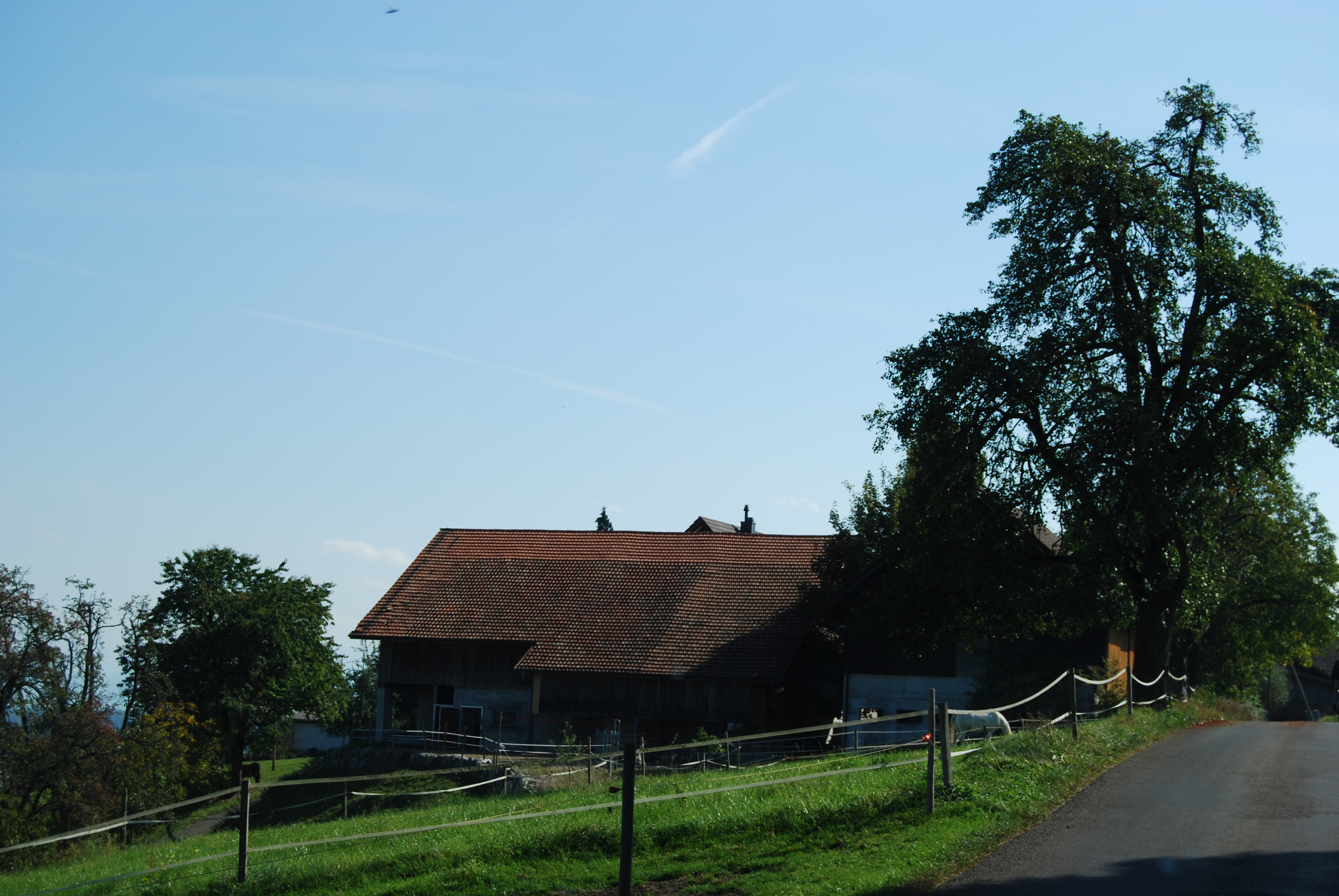
Farm house in Kallern

Kallern has a population (as of December 2020) of 399 As of June 2009, 7.2% of the population are foreign nationals. Over the last 10 years (1997–2007) the population has changed at a rate of 10.6%. Most of the population (as of 2000) speaks German(95.5%), with English being second most common ( 1.9%) and Italian being third ( 0.8%).

The age distribution, as of 2008, in Kallern is; 39 children or 12.3% of the population are between 0 and 9 years old and 33 teenagers or 10.4% are between 10 and 19. Of the adult population, 38 people or 12.0% of the population are between 20 and 29 years old. 45 people or 14.2% are between 30 and 39, 58 people or 18.4% are between 40 and 49, and 53 people or 16.8% are between 50 and 59. The senior population distribution is 25 people or 7.9% of the population are between 60 and 69 years old, 15 people or 4.7% are between 70 and 79, there are 9 people or 2.8% who are between 80 and 89, and there is 1 person who is 90 or older.

As of 2000 the average number of residents per living room was 0.59 which is about equal to the cantonal average of 0.57 per room. In this case, a room is defined as space of a housing unit of at least 4 m^{2} (43 sq ft) as normal bedrooms, dining rooms, living rooms, kitchens and habitable cellars and attics. About 80.5% of the total households were owner occupied, or in other words did not pay rent (though they may have a mortgage or a rent-to-own agreement).

As of 2000, there were 3 homes with 1 or 2 persons in the household, 22 homes with 3 or 4 persons in the household, and 57 homes with 5 or more persons in the household. As of 2000, there were 84 private households (homes and apartments) in the municipality, and an average of 3.1 persons per household. In 2008 there were 75 single family homes (or 64.7% of the total) out of a total of 116 homes and apartments. There were a total of 2 empty apartments for a 1.7% vacancy rate. As of 2007, the construction rate of new housing units was 6.4 new units per 1000 residents.

In the 2007 federal election the most popular party was the SVP which received 47.1% of the vote. The next three most popular parties were the CVP (18.7%), the SP (10%) and the Green Party (8.4%).

The historical population is given in the following table:

Historical population
Year	Pop.	±%
1850	329	—
1900	225	−31.6%
1950	229	+1.8%
2000	264	+15.3%

== Heritage sites of national significance ==
The farm house at Unterniesenberg 45 is listed as a Swiss heritage site of national significance.

== Economy ==
As of 2007, Kallern had an unemployment rate of 2.11%. As of 2005, there were 48 people employed in the primary economic sector and about 18 businesses involved in this sector. 8 people are employed in the secondary sector and there are 5 businesses in this sector. 35 people are employed in the tertiary sector, with 8 businesses in this sector.

In 2000 there were 142 workers who lived in the municipality. Of these, 96 or about 67.6% of the residents worked outside Kallern while 13 people commuted into the municipality for work. There were a total of 59 jobs (of at least 6 hours per week) in the municipality. Of the working population, 6.8% used public transportation to get to work, and 47.3% used a private car.

== Religion ==
From the 2000 census, 184 or 69.7% were Roman Catholic, while 54 or 20.5% belonged to the Swiss Reformed Church.

== Education ==
The entire Swiss population is generally well educated. In Kallern about 72.3% of the population (between age 25-64) have completed either non-mandatory upper secondary education or additional higher education (either university or a Fachhochschule). Of the school age population (in the 2008/2009 school year), there are 23 students attending primary school in the municipality.
