= Besenbüren =

- Municipality
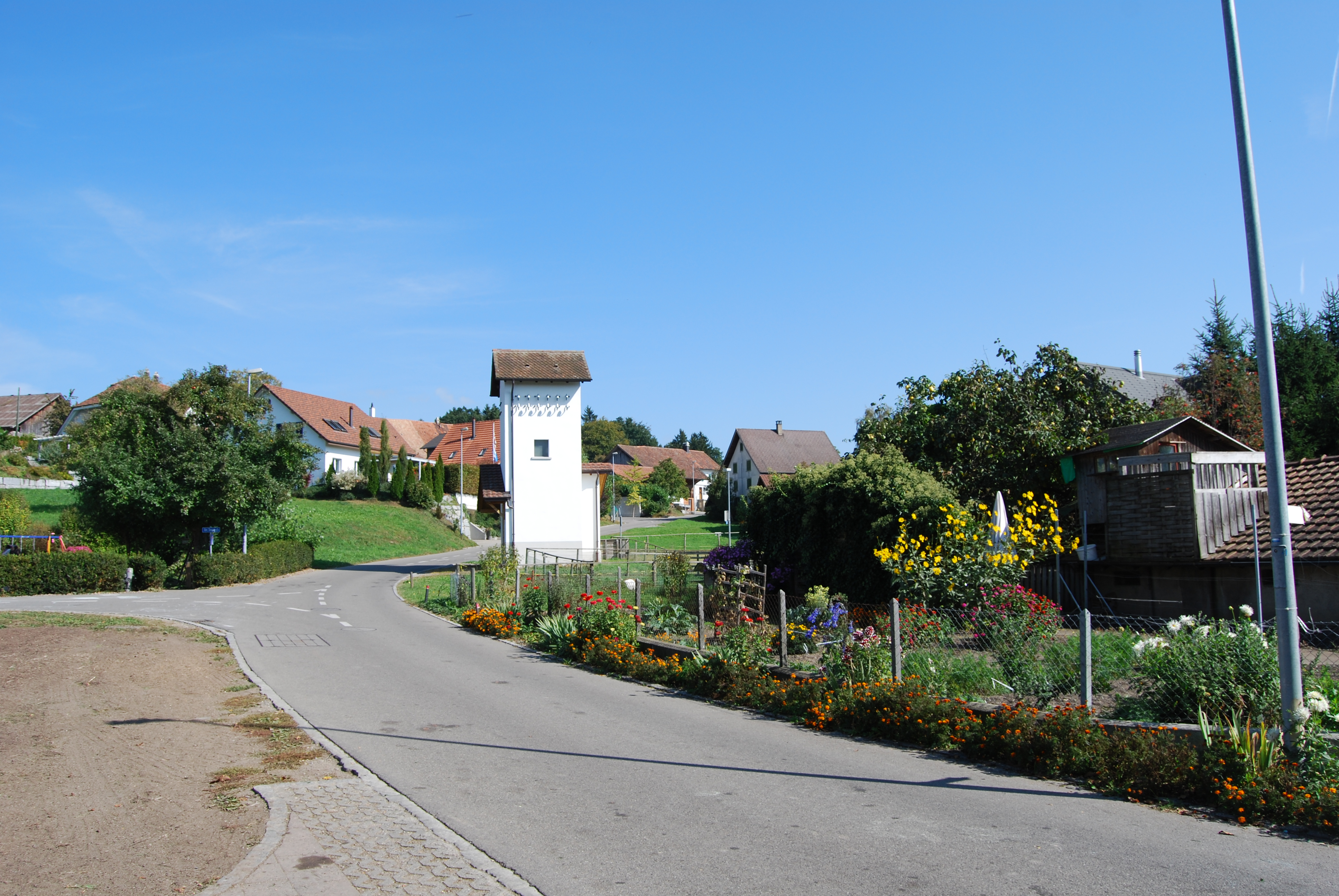

- Flag Coat of arms
- Location of Besenbüren
- Location within Switzerland Location within Canton of Aargau
- Coordinates: 47°19′N 8°21′E
- Country: Switzerland
- Canton: Aargau
- District: Muri

Area
  - Total: 2.38 km^{2} (0.92 sq mi)
- Elevation: 455 m (1,493 ft)

Population (December 2020)
  - Total: 632
  - Density: 266/km^{2} (688/sq mi)
- Time zone: UTC+01:00 (CET)
  - Summer (DST): UTC+02:00 (CEST)
- Postal code: 5627
- SFOS number: 4226
- ISO 3166 code: CH-AG
- Surrounded by: Aristau, Boswil, Bünzen, Hermetschwil-Staffeln, Rottenschwil
- Website: www.besenbueren.ch

Besenbüren is a municipality in the district of Muri in the canton of Aargau in Switzerland.

== History ==
The first indication of human settlement near Besenbüren are paleo- and mesolithic items that were discovered in the Forenmoos. The modern municipality of Besenbüren is first mentioned in the Acta Murensia, which was first drawn up in 1160 but included a number of various older documents, as Besenbürren. The major landholders in the Middle Ages in Besenbüren were Muri and Engelberg Abbeys. Under the Habsburgs it belonged to the Muri district. After 1415 it belonged to the Boswil district. The rights that the Hermann of Heidegg received after the conquest of the Aargau by the Swiss Conderation remained with his family until 1617, when they were transferred to Muri Abbey.

In the 19th century, agricultural employment and the straw plaiting industry provided nearly all the jobs in the municipality. In the second half of the 19th century, the population decreased as a result of fires, emigration and land scarcity. The bad traffic situation and the small territory led to no industrial development. In 1990, the agricultural sector still provided 33% of the jobs, while the services sector provides 47%.

== Geography ==
Besenbüren has an area, as of 2009, of 2.38 square kilometers (0.92 sq mi). Of this area, 1.58 km^{2} (0.61 sq mi) or 66.4% is used for agricultural purposes, while 0.47 km^{2} (0.18 sq mi) or 19.7% is forested. Of the rest of the land, 0.29 km^{2} (0.11 sq mi) or 12.2% is settled (buildings or roads) and 0.01 km^{2} (2.5 acres) or 0.4% is unproductive land.

Of the built up area, industrial buildings made up 1.3% of the total area while housing and buildings made up 5.5% and transportation infrastructure made up 4.2%. Out of the forested land, all of the forested land area is covered with heavy forests. Of the agricultural land, 55.5% is used for growing crops and 9.7% is pastures, while 1.3% is used for orchards or vine crops.

The municipality is located in the Muri district on the western edge of the Wagenrain. It consists of the village of Besenbüren.

== Coat of arms ==
The blazon of the municipal coat of arms is Or on a Mount serrated Vert a Birch tree issuant proper between two issuant cranberry blossoms proper.

== Demographics ==
Besenbüren has a population (as of December 2020) of 632 As of June 2009, 5.9% of the population are foreign nationals. Over the last 10 years (1997–2007) the population has changed at a rate of 42%. Most of the population (as of 2000) speaks German (97.2%), with English being second most common ( 0.6%) and Finnish being third ( 0.4%).

The age distribution, as of 2008, in Besenbüren is; 90 children or 15.5% of the population are between 0 and 9 years old and 76 teenagers or 13.1% are between 10 and 19. Of the adult population, 53 people or 9.1% of the population are between 20 and 29 years old. 76 people or 13.1% are between 30 and 39, 134 people or 23.0% are between 40 and 49, and 76 people or 13.1% are between 50 and 59. The senior population distribution is 36 people or 6.2% of the population are between 60 and 69 years old, 21 people or 3.6% are between 70 and 79, there are 17 people or 2.9% who are between 80 and 89, and there are 3 people or 0.5% who are 90 and older.

As of 2000 the average number of residents per living room was 0.55 which is about equal to the cantonal average of 0.57 per room. In this case, a room is defined as space of a housing unit of at least 4 m^{2} (43 sq ft) as normal bedrooms, dining rooms, living rooms, kitchens and habitable cellars and attics. About 66.1% of the total households were owner occupied, or in other words did not pay rent (though they may have a mortgage or a rent-to-own agreement).

As of 2000, there were 16 homes with 1 or 2 persons in the household, 53 homes with 3 or 4 persons in the household, and 108 homes with 5 or more persons in the household. As of 2000, there were 183 private households (homes and apartments) in the municipality, and an average of 2.7 persons per household. In 2008 there were 166 single family homes (or 65.1% of the total) out of a total of 255 homes and apartments. There were a total of 0 empty apartments for a 0.0% vacancy rate. As of 2007, the construction rate of new housing units was 6.8 new units per 1000 residents.

In the 2007 federal election the most popular party was the SVP which received 46.8% of the vote. The next three most popular parties were the CVP (21.5%), the SP (11.7%) and the Green Party (7.1%).

The historical population is given in the following table:

Historical population
Year	Pop.	±%
1850	417	—
1900	289	−30.7%
1950	322	+11.4%
1980	280	−13.0%
2000	496	+77.1%

== Heritage sites of national significance ==
The Speicher (warehouse) on Zentralstrasse is listed as a Swiss heritage site of national significance.

== Economy ==
As of 2007, Besenbüren had an unemployment rate of 1.5%. As of 2005, there were 36 people employed in the primary economic sector and about 17 businesses involved in this sector. 14 people are employed in the secondary sector and there are 6 businesses in this sector. 41 people are employed in the tertiary sector, with 10 businesses in this sector.

In 2000 there were 261 workers who lived in the municipality. Of these, 207 or about 79.3% of the residents worked outside Besenbüren while 38 people commuted into the municipality for work. There were a total of 92 jobs (of at least 6 hours per week) in the municipality. Of the working population, 6.6% used public transportation to get to work, and 59.5% used a private car.

== Religion ==
From the 2000 census, 277 or 55.8% were Roman Catholic, while 133 or 26.8% belonged to the Swiss Reformed Church.

== Education ==
The entire Swiss population is generally well educated. In Besenbüren about 76.6% of the population (between age 25–64) have completed either non-mandatory upper secondary education or additional higher education (either university or a Fachhochschule). Of the school age population (in the 2008/2009 school year), there are 58 students attending primary school in the municipality.
