= Bünzen, Aargau =

Bünzen
- Municipality
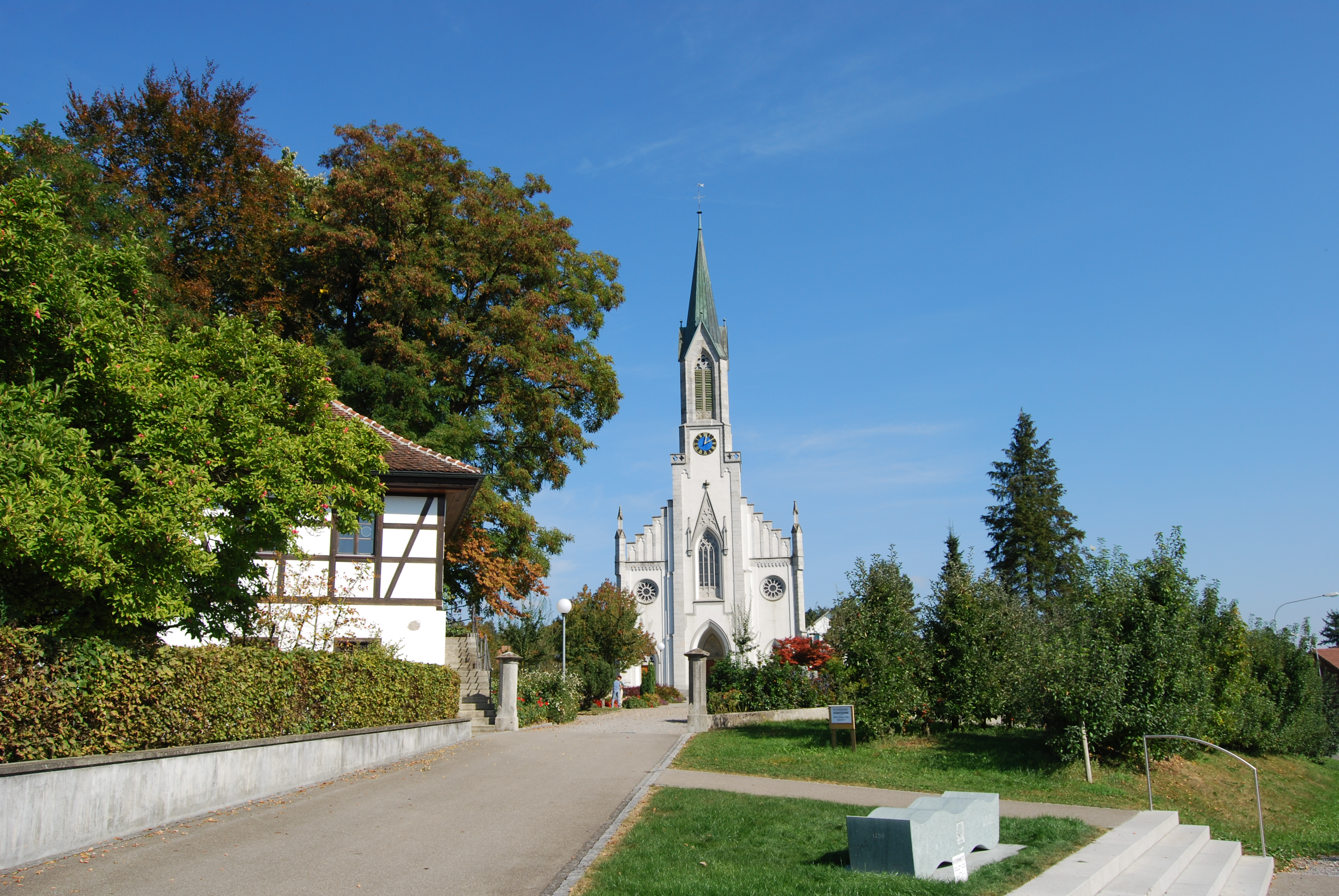

- Flag Coat of arms
- Location of Bünzen
- Location within Switzerland Location within Canton of Aargau
- Coordinates: 47°19′N 8°20′E
- Country: Switzerland
- Canton: Aargau
- District: Muri

Area
  - Total: 5.77 km^{2} (2.23 sq mi)
- Elevation: 441 m (1,447 ft)

Population (December 2020)
  - Total: 1,128
  - Density: 195/km^{2} (506/sq mi)
- Time zone: UTC+01:00 (CET)
  - Summer (DST): UTC+02:00 (CEST)
- Postal code: 5624
- SFOS number: 4229
- ISO 3166 code: CH-AG
- Surrounded by: Besenbüren, Boswil, Hermetschwil-Staffeln, Waltenschwil
- Website: www.buenzen.ch

Bünzen is a municipality in the district of Muri in the canton of Aargau in Switzerland.

== History ==
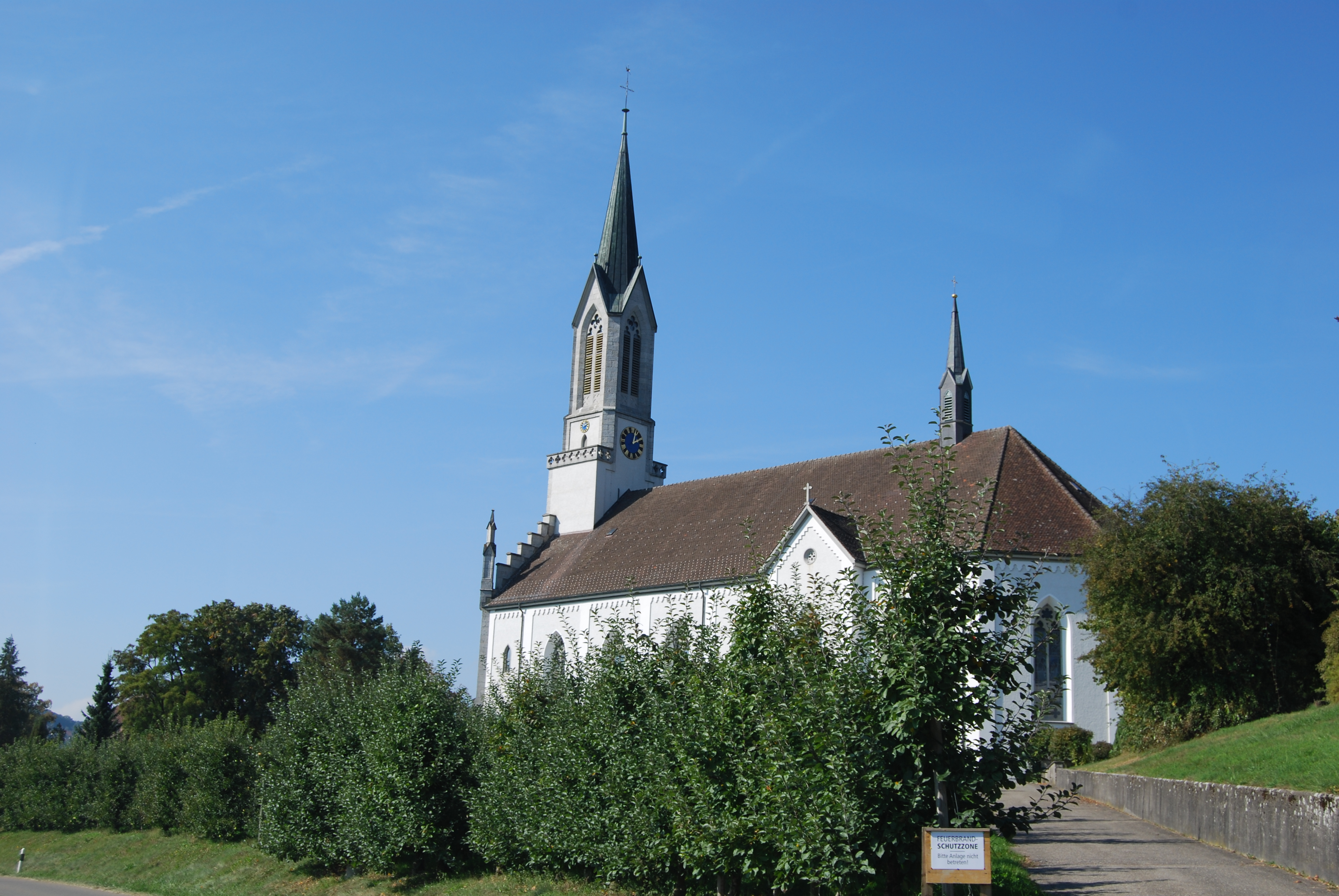
The current church of Bünzen dates from 1862

Prehistoric items have been found scattered on the banks of the former moraine, as well as Roman era objects. The modern municipality of Bünzen is first mentioned in 1259 as Bunzina. In 1321 Muri Abbey acquired a Meierhof farm and church rights in Bünzen from Markwart of Rüssegg. After the conquest of the Aargau in 1415, the Swiss Confederation placed the village in the Hermetschwil district. The rights to low justice were held by the administrator of the Meierhof.

In 1328 the village church, under the authority of Muri Abbey, was incorporated. In 1412 the church was given Saint George as a patron saint. Today's neo-Gothic parish church building was built in 1862 at the northern exit of the village. It replaced the earlier church from 1508.

== Geography ==
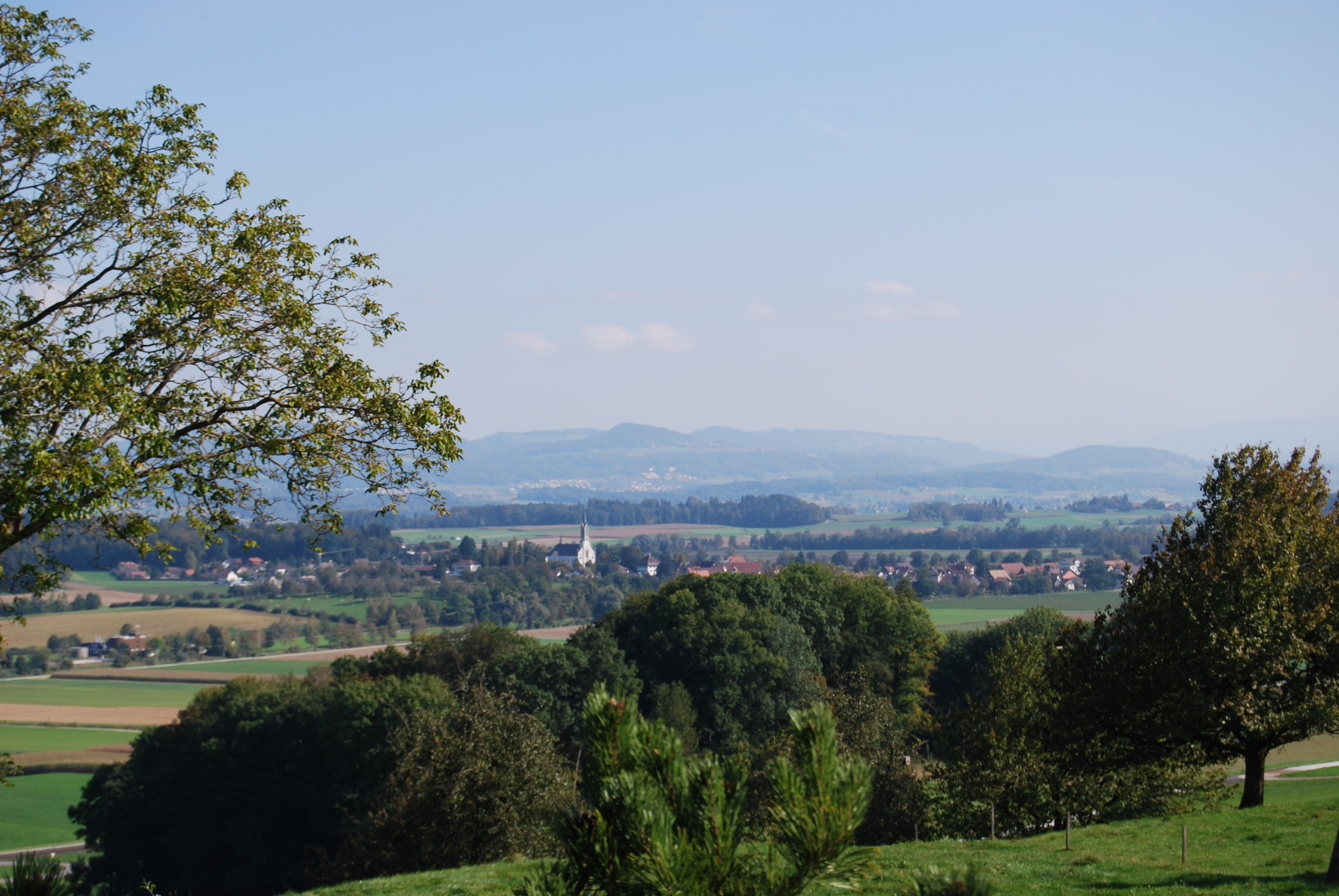
Bünzen, seen from Restaurant Jäger-Stübli at Kallern, AG

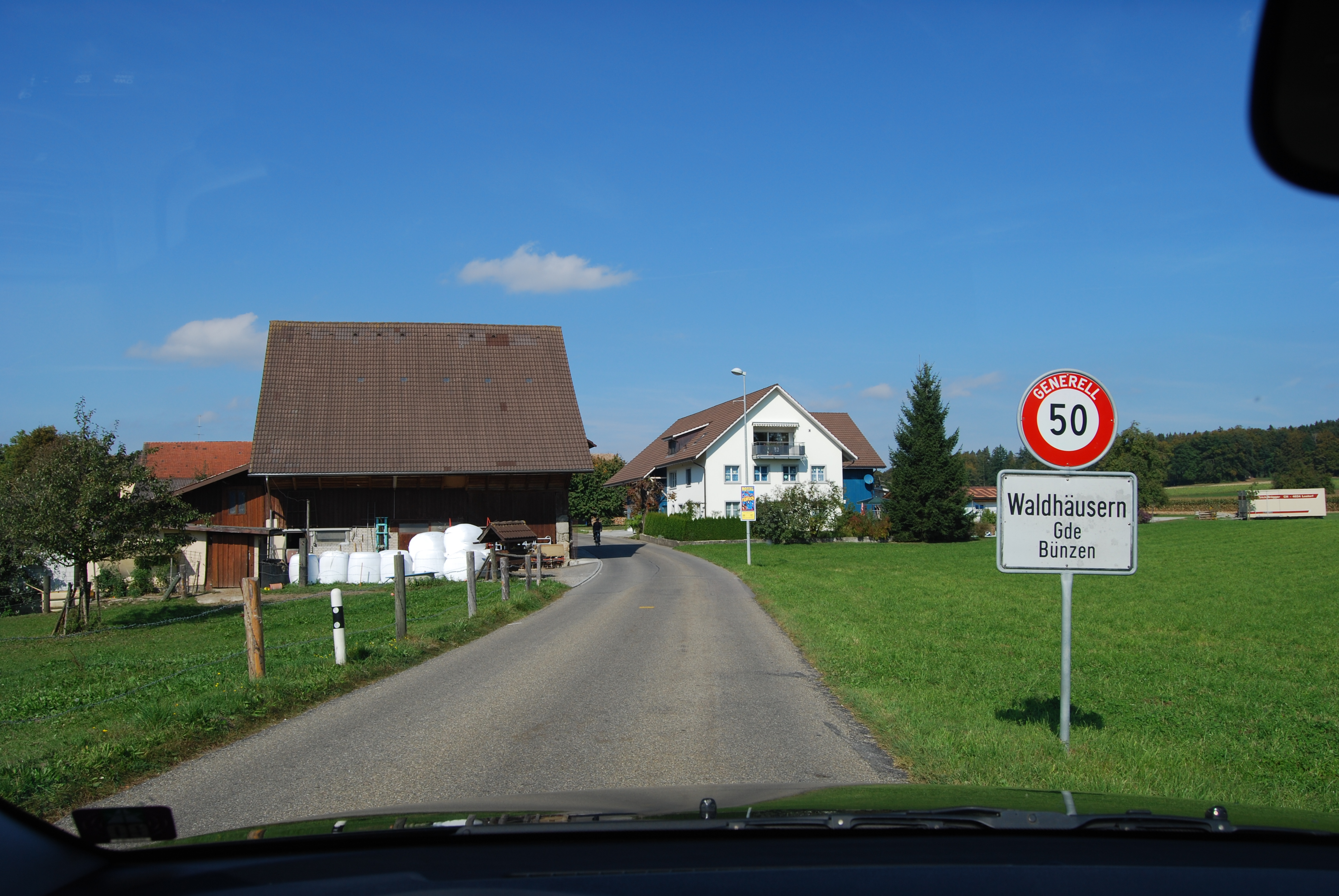
Waldhäusern village

Bünzen has an area, as of 2009, of 5.77 square kilometers (2.23 sq mi). Of this area, 3.51 km^{2} (1.36 sq mi) or 60.8% is used for agricultural purposes, while 1.64 km^{2} (0.63 sq mi) or 28.4% is forested. Of the rest of the land, 0.58 km^{2} (0.22 sq mi) or 10.1% is settled (buildings or roads), 0.02 km^{2} (4.9 acres) or 0.3% is either rivers or lakes and 0.02 km^{2} (4.9 acres) or 0.3% is unproductive land.

Of the built up area, housing and buildings made up 5.0% and transportation infrastructure made up 3.8%. Out of the forested land, all of the forested land area is covered with heavy forests. Of the agricultural land, 52.3% is used for growing crops and 8.3% is pastures. All the water in the municipality is in rivers and streams.

The municipality is located in the Muri district at the foot of the Lindenberg and on moraine that stretches to the shore of the Bünz river. It consists of the village of Bünzen and the, independent until 1940, village of Waldhäusern.

== Coat of arms ==
The blazon of the municipal coat of arms is Argent a Beech eradicated Vert and in base a Bar wavy Azure. The waving lines represent the river Bünz.

== Demographics ==
Aerial view by Walter Mittelholzer (1918-1937)

Bünzen has a population (as of December 2020) of 1,128. As of June 2009, 8.0% of the population are foreign nationals. Over the last 10 years (1997–2007) the population has changed at a rate of 4.1%. Most of the population (as of 2000) speaks German (93.4%), with Italian being second most common ( 1.5%) and Serbo-Croatian being third ( 1.0%).

The age distribution, as of 2008, in Bünzen is; 105 children or 10.8% of the population are between 0 and 9 years old and 135 teenagers or 13.9% are between 10 and 19. Of the adult population, 114 people or 11.8% of the population are between 20 and 29 years old. 129 people or 13.3% are between 30 and 39, 169 people or 17.5% are between 40 and 49, and 151 people or 15.6% are between 50 and 59. The senior population distribution is 87 people or 9.0% of the population are between 60 and 69 years old, 32 people or 3.3% are between 70 and 79, there are 39 people or 4.0% who are between 80 and 89, and there are 7 people or 0.7% who are 90 and older.

As of 2000 the average number of residents per living room was 0.56 which is about equal to the cantonal average of 0.57 per room. In this case, a room is defined as space of a housing unit of at least 4 m^{2} (43 sq ft) as normal bedrooms, dining rooms, living rooms, kitchens and habitable cellars and attics. About 64.6% of the total households were owner occupied, or in other words did not pay rent (though they may have a mortgage or a rent-to-own agreement).

As of 2000, there were 16 homes with 1 or 2 persons in the household, 124 homes with 3 or 4 persons in the household, and 171 homes with 5 or more persons in the household. As of 2000, there were 318 private households (homes and apartments) in the municipality, and an average of 2.7 persons per household. In 2008 there were 206 single family homes (or 49.2% of the total) out of a total of 419 homes and apartments. There were a total of 4 empty apartments for a 1.0% vacancy rate. As of 2007, the construction rate of new housing units was 14.8 new units per 1000 residents.

In the 2007 federal election the most popular party was the SVP which received 44.3% of the vote. The next three most popular parties were the CVP (18.9%), the SP (11.8%) and the Other (10%).

The historical population is given in the following table:

Historical population
Year	Pop.	±%
1850	574	—
1860	662	+15.3%
1900	585	−11.6%
1930	826	+41.2%
1950	759	−8.1%
1980	683	−10.0%
2000	865	+26.6%

== Religion ==
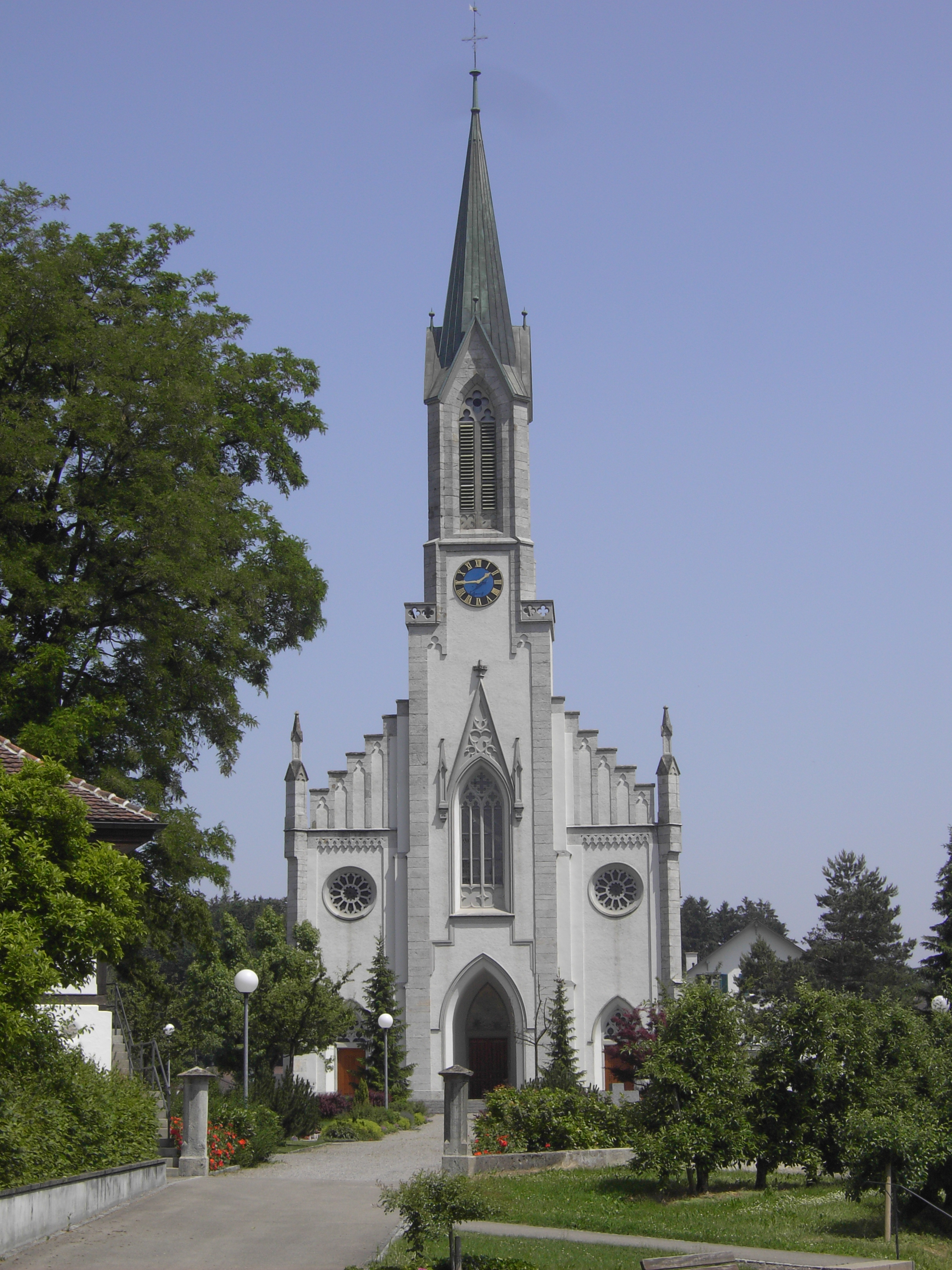
Bünzen church

From the 2000 census, 569 or 65.8% were Roman Catholic, while 151 or 17.5% belonged to the Swiss Reformed Church.

== Economy ==
As of 2007, Bünzen had an unemployment rate of 1.42%. As of 2005, there were 71 people employed in the primary economic sector and about 25 businesses involved in this sector. 130 people are employed in the secondary sector and there are 19 businesses in this sector. 77 people are employed in the tertiary sector, with 28 businesses in this sector.

In 2000 there were 462 workers who lived in the municipality. Of these, 326 or about 70.6% of the residents worked outside Bünzen while 157 people commuted into the municipality for work. There were a total of 293 jobs (of at least 6 hours per week) in the municipality. Of the working population, 7.8% used public transportation to get to work, and 51.9% used a private car.

== Transport ==
Bünzen shares a railway station with Boswil. The station is located on the Aargau Southern Railway line and served by services of the Aargau S-Bahn and the S42 of the Zurich S-Bahn, which is a rush-hour service.

== Education ==
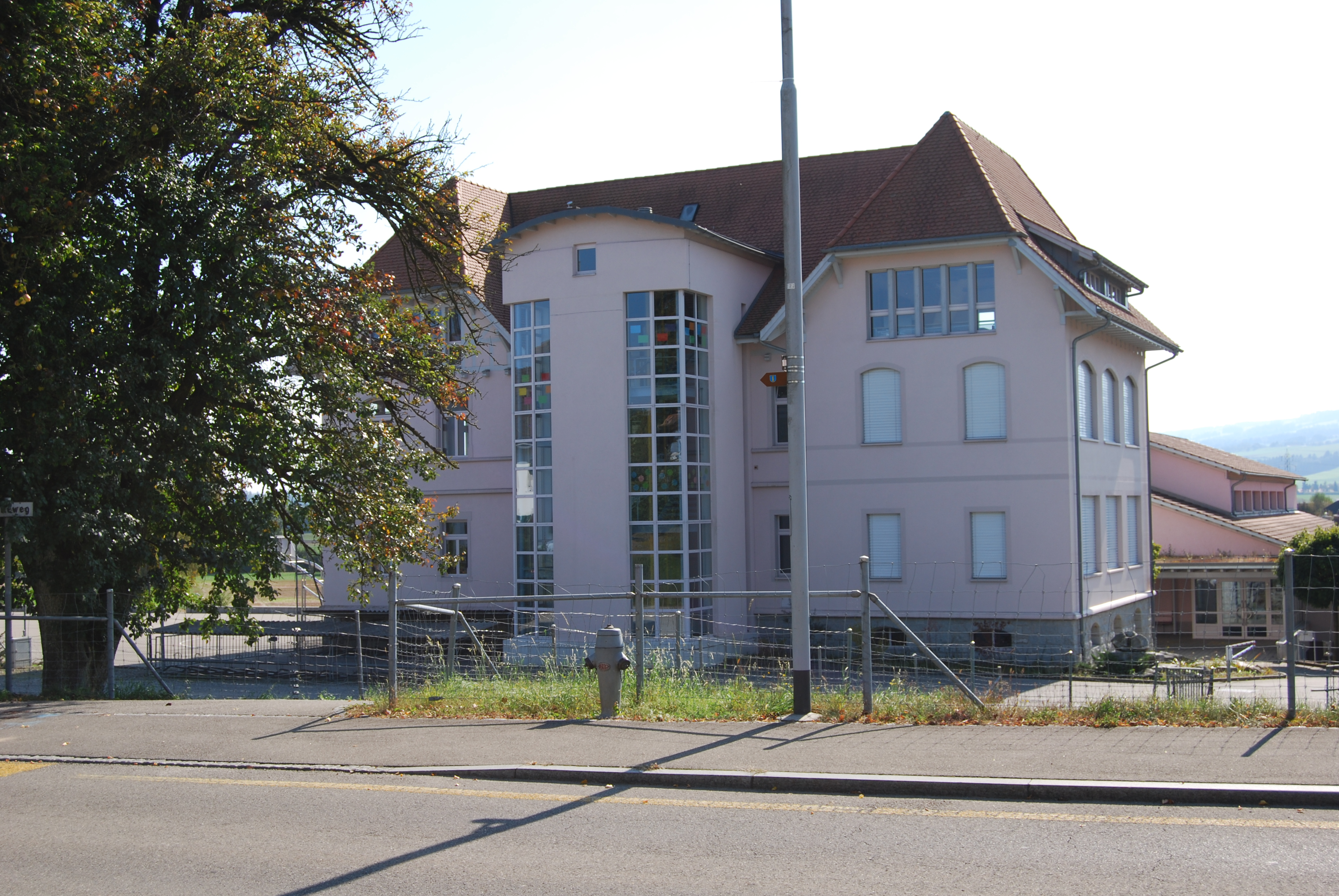
School at Bünzen

The entire Swiss population is generally well educated. In Bünzen about 74.5% of the population (between age 25-64) have completed either non-mandatory upper secondary education or additional higher education (either university or a Fachhochschule). Of the school age population (in the 2008/2009 school year), there are 89 students attending primary school in the municipality.
