= Rottenschwil =

- Municipality
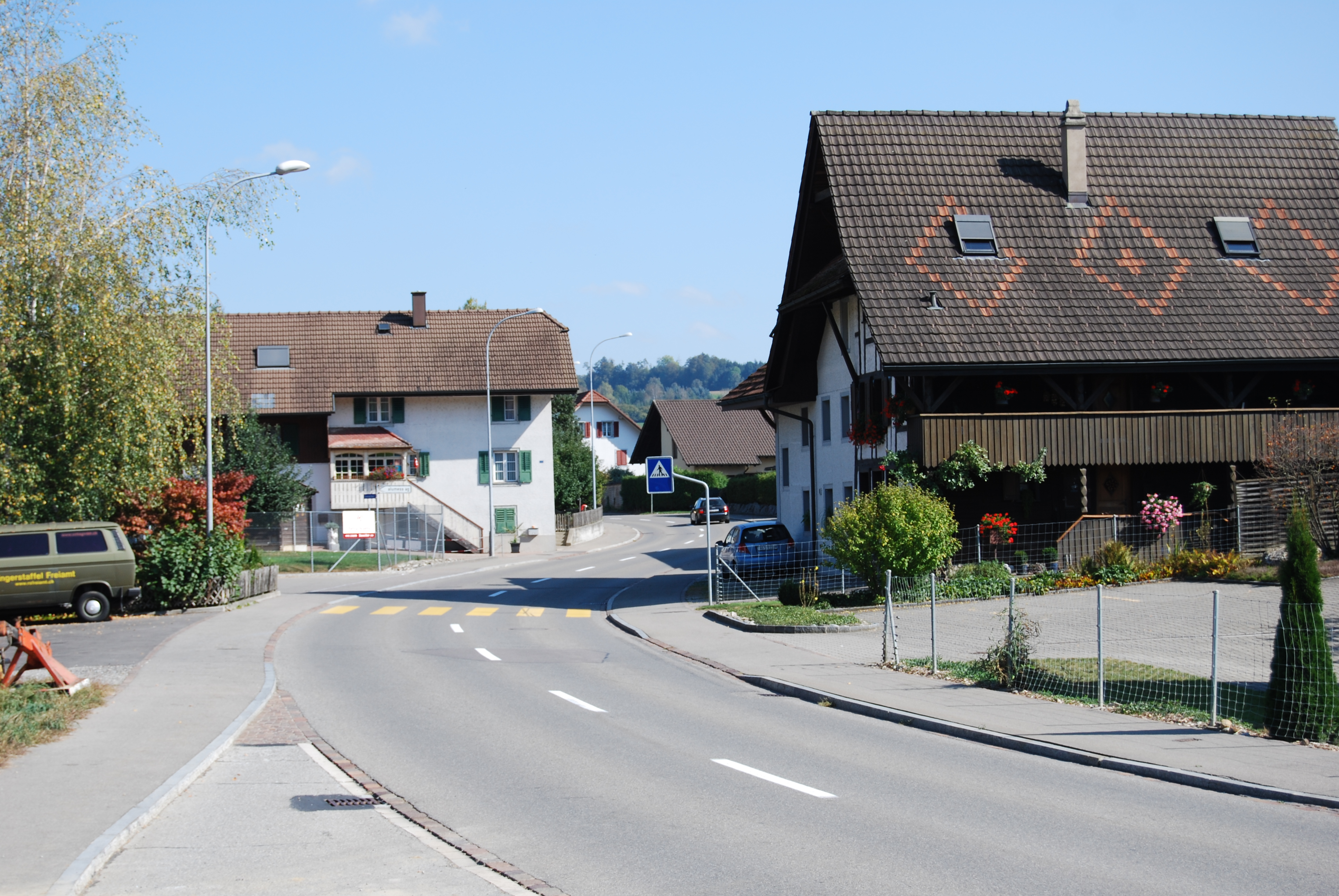

- Flag Coat of arms
- Location of Rottenschwil
- Location within Switzerland Location within Canton of Aargau
- Coordinates: 47°19′N 8°22′E
- Country: Switzerland
- Canton: Aargau
- District: Muri

Area
  - Total: 4.49 km^{2} (1.73 sq mi)
- Elevation: 387 m (1,270 ft)

Population (December 2006)
  - Total: 807
  - Density: 180/km^{2} (466/sq mi)
- Time zone: UTC+01:00 (CET)
  - Summer (DST): UTC+02:00 (CEST)
- Postal code: 8919
- SFOS number: 4238
- ISO 3166 code: CH-AG
- Surrounded by: Aristau, Besenbüren, Hermetschwil-Staffeln, Jonen, Oberlunkhofen, Unterlunkhofen
- Website: www.rottenschwil.ch

Rottenschwil is a municipality in the district of Muri in the canton of Aargau in Switzerland.

== History ==
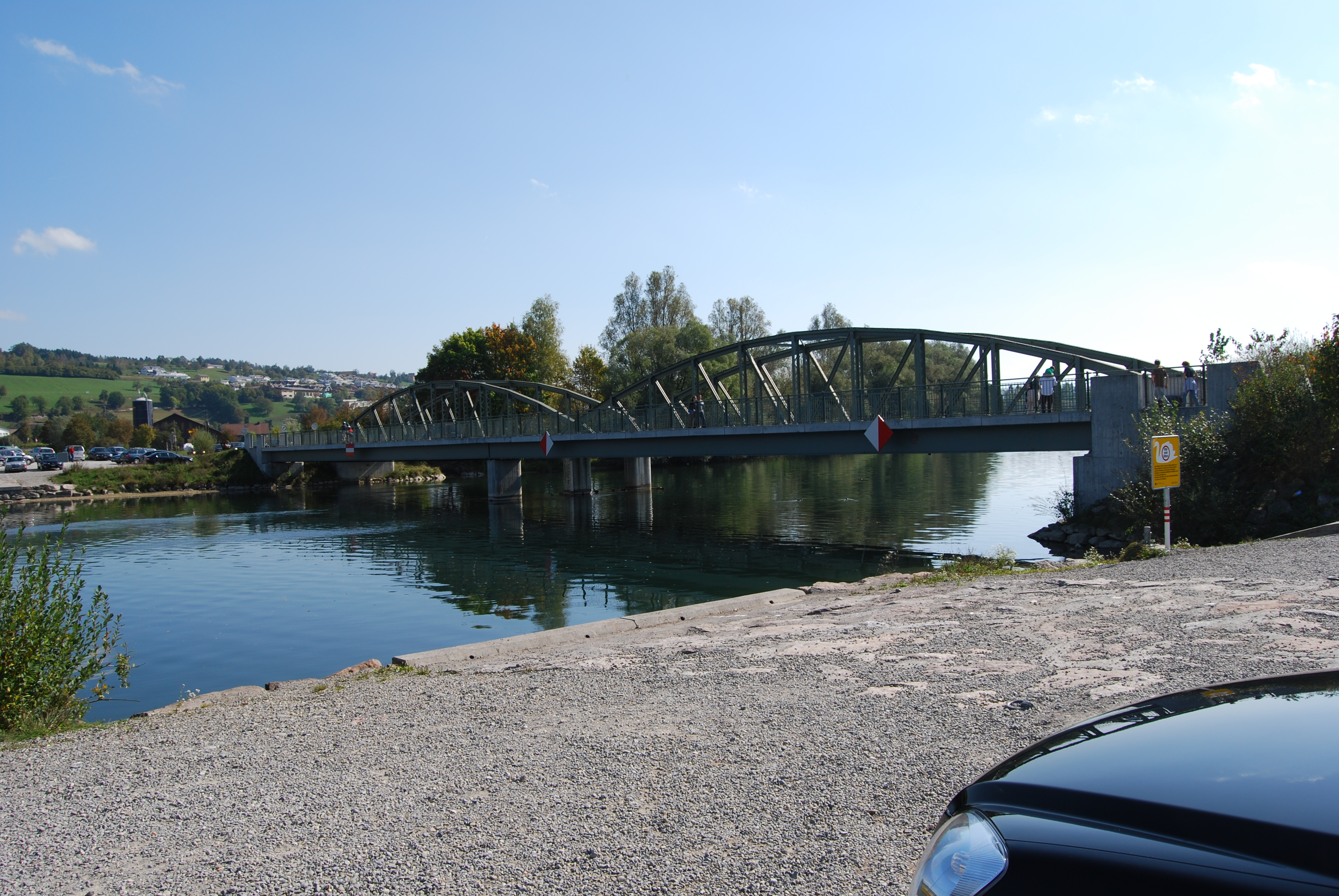
Reuss Bridge near Rottenschwil

The earliest trace of a human settlement in the area around Rottenschwil, is a Roman era farm. The modern municipality of Rottenschwil is first mentioned in 1281 as Rotolfswile. The major land owner in the area was Hermetschwil Abbey, but the Habsburgs held the vogtei office over the Abbey's land. With the conquest of the Aargau in 1415 those rights transferred to the Swiss Confederation. From 1415 until 1798, Rottenschwil was a part of the district of Muri in the Freie Ämter, which were governed as "subject lands" by all or some of the Confederates. A ferry over the Reuss river is first mentioned in 1312. In 1510, Muri Abbey sold their quarter of the profits from the ferry to the city of Bremgarten. Frequent floods strongly affected the population and buildings. In 1580 Hermetschwil Abbey helped construct a milldam on the river.

During the Helvetic Republic (1798–1803) it was part of the district of Bremgarten in the Canton of Baden. After 1803, it was part of the Muri District in the newly formed Canton of Aargau. In 1860, a canal between Mühlau and Hermetschwil opened up additional agricultural land for the municipality. The Reuss bridge was built in 1905-06, which simplified transportation. In 1969, the Reuss Valley Amelioration opened up more usable land, and reduced the damage that the river caused in the village. A 60 hectares (150 acres) nature conservation area was set aside in 1972.

== Geography ==
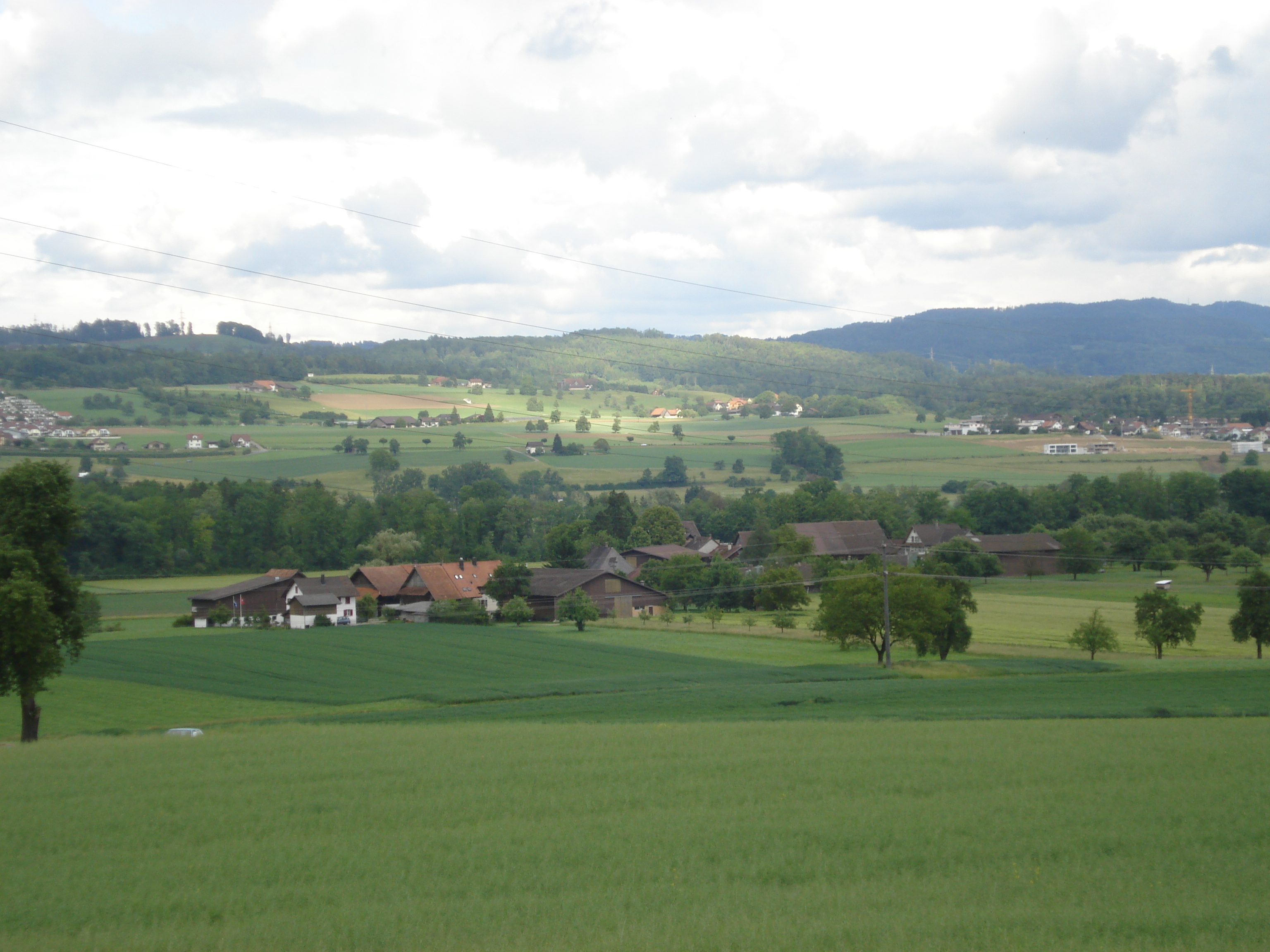
The hamlet of Werd

Rottenschwil has an area, as of 2009, of 4.49 square kilometers (1.73 sq mi). Of this area, 2.48 km^{2} (0.96 sq mi) or 55.2% is used for agricultural purposes, while 1.07 km^{2} (0.41 sq mi) or 23.8% is forested. Of the rest of the land, 0.33 km^{2} (0.13 sq mi) or 7.3% is settled (buildings or roads), 0.24 km^{2} (0.093 sq mi) or 5.3% is either rivers or lakes and 0.34 km^{2} (0.13 sq mi) or 7.6% is unproductive land.

Of the built up area, housing and buildings made up 3.6% and transportation infrastructure made up 2.9%. Out of the forested land, 22.7% of the total land area is heavily forested and 1.1% is covered with orchards or small clusters of trees. Of the agricultural land, 41.4% is used for growing crops and 12.5% is pastures, while 1.3% is used for orchards or vine crops. Of the water in the municipality, 2.4% is in lakes and 2.9% is in rivers and streams. Of the unproductive areas, 7.6% is unproductive vegetation.

The municipality is located in the Muri district, on the left bank of the Reuss river. It consists of the village of Rottenschwil and the hamlets of Stägen and Werd.

== Coat of arms ==
The blazon of the municipal coat of arms is Azure a Pike proper in chief a Mullet Or and in base three fillets wavy Argent.

== Demographics ==
Rottenschwil has a population (as of December 2020) of 911. As of June 2009, 10.5% of the population are foreign nationals. Over the last 10 years (1997–2007) the population has changed at a rate of 3%. Most of the population (as of 2000) speaks German (94.3%), with Portuguese being second most common ( 1.2%) and French being third ( 1.0%).

The age distribution, as of 2008, in Rottenschwil is; 108 children or 13.1% of the population are between 0 and 9 years old and 137 teenagers or 16.6% are between 10 and 19. Of the adult population, 78 people or 9.4% of the population are between 20 and 29 years old. 106 people or 12.8% are between 30 and 39, 160 people or 19.3% are between 40 and 49, and 136 people or 16.4% are between 50 and 59. The senior population distribution is 63 people or 7.6% of the population are between 60 and 69 years old, 24 people or 2.9% are between 70 and 79, there are 13 people or 1.6% who are between 80 and 89, and there are 2 people or 0.2% who are 90 and older.

As of 2000, there were 14 homes with 1 or 2 persons in the household, 133 homes with 3 or 4 persons in the household, and 125 homes with 5 or more persons in the household. As of 2000, there were 304 private households (homes and apartments) in the municipality, and an average of 2.6 persons per household. In 2008 there were 145 single family homes (or 46.6% of the total) out of a total of 311 homes and apartments. There were a total of 1 empty apartments for a 0.3% vacancy rate. As of 2007, the construction rate of new housing units was 2.4 new units per 1000 residents.

In the 2007 federal election the most popular party was the SVP which received 38.4% of the vote. The next three most popular parties were the CVP (21%), the SP (17.3%) and the FDP (8.4%).

The historical population is given in the following table:

Historical population
Year	Pop.	±%
1803	257	—
1850	378	+47.1%
1888	300	−20.6%
1900	403	+34.3%
1950	274	−32.0%
2000	806	+194.2%

== Economy ==
As of 2007, Rottenschwil had an unemployment rate of 1.19%. As of 2005, there were 29 people employed in the primary economic sector and about 11 businesses involved in this sector. 75 people are employed in the secondary sector and there are 13 businesses in this sector. 64 people are employed in the tertiary sector, with 23 businesses in this sector.

In 2000 there were 429 workers who lived in the municipality. Of these, 333 or about 77.6% of the residents worked outside Rottenschwil while 76 people commuted into the municipality for work. There were a total of 172 jobs (of at least 6 hours per week) in the municipality. Of the working population, 15.5% used public transportation to get to work, and 57.6% used a private car.

== Religion ==
From the 2000 census, 469 or 58.2% were Roman Catholic, while 219 or 27.2% belonged to the Swiss Reformed Church. Of the rest of the population, there was 1 individual who belonged to the Christian Catholic faith.

== Education ==
In Rottenschwil about 83% of the population (between age 25-64) have completed either non-mandatory upper secondary education or additional higher education (either university or a Fachhochschule). Of the school age population (in the 2008/2009 school year), there are 100 students attending primary school in the municipality.
