= List of cultural property of national significance in Switzerland: Aargau =

This list contains all cultural property of national significance (class A) in the canton of Aargau from the 2009 Swiss Inventory of Cultural Property of National and Regional Significance. It is sorted by municipality and contains 175 individual buildings, 11 collections and 56 archaeological finds.

The geographic coordinates provided are in the Swiss coordinate system as given in the Inventory.

== Aarau ==
KGS No.^{?}	Picture	Name	Street Address	CH1903 X coordinate	CH1903 Y coordinate	Location
8924; 8489; 9321	Aargau Cantonal Library and Aargauer Kunsthaus	Aargau Cantonal Library and Aargauer Kunsthaus	Aargauerplatz	645.755	248.963	47.389903°N 8.044631°E
7	Alte Kantonsschule (Old Cantonal School)	Alte Kantonsschule (Old Cantonal School)	Bahnhofstrasse 91	646.400	249.350	47.393339°N 8.053214°E
9815	Christian Catholic Rectory (former Helferei)	Christian Catholic Rectory (former Helferei)	Adelbändli 2	645.621	249.320	47.393123°N 8.042893°E
9281	Former Rickenbach factory	Former Rickenbach factory	Rohrerstrasse 12	646.649	249.405	47.393816°N 8.056517°E
10465	Garten Schmidlin	Garten Schmidlin	Wasserfluhweg 5	645.894	248.056	47.381736°N 8.046379°E
9386	Grossratsgebäude (Grand Council building)	Grossratsgebäude (Grand Council building)	Obere Vorstadt 10	645.827	248.936	47.389655°N 8.045582°E
9115	House zum Erker	House zum Erker	Rathausgasse 10	645.666	249.282	47.392778°N 8.043485°E
12	Katholisches Rectory (former Feerhaus)	Katholisches Rectory (former Feerhaus)	Laurenzenvorstadt 80	646.190	249.394	47.393749°N 8.050437°E
9817	Krematorium	Krematorium	Rosengartenweg	645.942	248.758	47.388046°N 8.047087°E
8490	Naturama Aargau	Naturama Aargau	Feerstrasse 15	646.269	249.263	47.392565°N 8.05147°E
23	Swiss Reformed Stadtkirche	Swiss Reformed Stadtkirche	Kirchplatz	645.595	249.273	47.392702°N 8.042544°E
5	Regierungsgebäude	Regierungsgebäude	Regierungsplatz	645.813	248.982	47.39007°N 8.045401°E
9387	Restaurant Zunftstube	Restaurant Zunftstube	Pelzgasse 19	645.768	249.249	47.392475°N 8.044833°E
9388	«Schlossgarten»	«Schlossgarten»	Laurenzenvorstadt 3	645.848	249.425	47.394052°N 8.04591°E
8786	State Archives des Canton Aargau (State Archives)	State Archives des Canton Aargau (State Archives)	Entfelderstrasse 22	646.121	248.740	47.387872°N 8.049456°E
Unknown		ISOS City: Aarau				

== Aarburg ==
KGS No.^{?}	Picture	Name	Street Address	CH1903 X coordinate	CH1903 Y coordinate	Location
31		Galgen or Gallows		635.570	243.320	47.339778°N 7.909293°E
29	Gasthof alte Post (former noble seat)	Gasthof alte Post (former noble seat)	Städtchen 5	634.773	241.192	47.32068°N 7.898583°E
28	castle and fortifications	castle and fortifications	Schlossrain	634.950	241.300	47.321642°N 7.900933°E
Unknown		ISOS Town: Aarburg				

== Ammerswil ==
KGS No.^{?}	Picture	Name	Street Address	CH1903 X coordinate	CH1903 Y coordinate	Location
34	Pfrundspeicher	Pfrundspeicher	Hendschikerstrasse	658.124	246.988	47.371165°N 8.208185°E

== Auw ==
KGS No.^{?}	Picture	Name	Street Address	CH1903 X coordinate	CH1903 Y coordinate	Location
9822	Old Mill	Old Mill	Alikonerstrasse 6	670.010	229.353	47.211403°N 8.362791°E
9823	Catholic Parish Church	Catholic Parish Church	Sinserstrasse	670.333	229.204	47.210029°N 8.367031°E
9824	St. Josephs Chapel	St. Josephs Chapel	Rüstenschwil	670.254	231.064	47.226766°N 8.366279°E
10547	Residential building	Residential building	eastern part, Käsereistrasse 13	670.188	229.261	47.210557°N 8.365126°E

== Baden ==
KGS No.^{?}	Picture	Name	Street Address	CH1903 X coordinate	CH1903 Y coordinate	Location
9163	ABB Schweiz Archives	ABB Schweiz Archives	Husmatt 7	663.644	256.308	47.454476°N 8.28259°E
9532	Aquae Helveticae	Aquae Helveticae	Roman vicus, medieval/modern spa town	665.850	259.220	47.480448°N 8.31227°E
9391	Berner House	Berner House	Weite Gasse 13	665.491	258.301	47.472219°N 8.307372°E
9826; 37?	Former common building of the Brown Boveri Co.	Former common building of the Brown Boveri Co.	Hauptbahnhof, Bahnhofstrasse 25	664.820	259.092	47.479399°N 8.298587°E
47	House «Zum Schwert»	House «Zum Schwert»	Schwertstrasse / Oelrainstrasse 29	665.653	258.888	47.477482°N 8.309607°E
46	Wooden Bridge	Wooden Bridge	Untere Halde / Wettingerstrasse	665.739	258.351	47.472644°N 8.310669°E
43	Hotel Verenahof	Hotel Verenahof	Kurplatz 1	665.945	259.250	47.480709°N 8.313534°E
9829	Hotel «Zum wilden Mann»	Hotel «Zum wilden Mann»	Obere Gasse 33	665.496	258.364	47.472785°N 8.307448°E
48	Catholic City Church and Sebastian's Chapel	Catholic City Church and Sebastian's Chapel	Kirchplatz	665.600	258.340	47.472559°N 8.308824°E
9833	Crematorium with Memorial Hall	Crematorium with Memorial Hall	Zürcherstrasse 108	665.357	257.112	47.461539°N 8.305421°E
9508	Kurtheater with glass foyer	Kurtheater with glass foyer	Parkstrasse 20	665.689	259.190	47.480195°N 8.310129°E
9835	Swiss Reformed Parish Church	Swiss Reformed Parish Church	Bahnhofplatz	665.620	258.789	47.476595°N 8.309155°E
9836	Regionalwerke Baden (former Städtische Werke)	Regionalwerke Baden (former Städtische Werke)	Haselstrasse 15	665.435	258.956	47.478115°N 8.306726°E
9758	Restaurant "Paradies"	Restaurant "Paradies"	Cordulaplatz	665.454	258.316	47.472358°N 8.306884°E
44	Ruins of Stein Castle	Ruins of Stein Castle		665.330	258.420	47.473305°N 8.305254°E
39	Stadthaus with Tagsatzungssaal	Stadthaus with Tagsatzungssaal	Rathausgasse 1	665.615	258.412	47.473205°N 8.309033°E
11609	Synagogue	Synagogue	Parkstrasse 17	665.594	259.024	47.478711°N 8.308845°E
53	Villa Boveri (since 1943 Clubhaus BBC/ABB)	Villa Boveri (since 1943 Clubhaus BBC/ABB)	Ländliweg 5	665.529	258.070	47.470138°N 8.307842°E
38	Villa Langmatt / Museum Langmatt Sidney and Jenny Brown Foundation	Villa Langmatt / Museum Langmatt; Sidney and Jenny Brown Foundation	Römerstrasse 30	665.492	259.320	47.481383°N 8.307535°E
Unknown		ISOS City: Baden / Ennetbaden				

== Bad Zurzach ==
KGS No.^{?}	Picture	Name	Street Address	CH1903 X coordinate	CH1903 Y coordinate	Location
320	Former Collegiate church of St. Verena	Former Collegiate church of St. Verena	Hauptstrasse	664.280	271.030	47.586814°N 8.293147°E
9904	Gasthof «Zur Waag» (Messehaus)	Gasthof «Zur Waag» (Messehaus)	Hauptstrasse 25	664.212	270.908	47.585724°N 8.292225°E
319	Swiss Reformed Church	Swiss Reformed Church	Schwertgasse 153	664.420	271.060	47.58707°N 8.295012°E
9905	Salzbohr Tower	Salzbohr Tower	Bohrturmweg	664.151	271.770	47.593482°N 8.291539°E
318	Tenedo, Pre-historic/Roman/Medieval/Modern Settlement	Tenedo, Pre-historic/Roman/Medieval/Modern Settlement		664.500	271.200	47.588321°N 8.296096°E
11731		Oberfeld, part of late Roman Rhine fortifications		665.950	270.100	47.578285°N 8.315207°E
Unknown		ISOS Town: Bad Zurzach				

== Beinwil (Freiamt) ==
KGS No.^{?}	Picture	Name	Street Address	CH1903 X coordinate	CH1903 Y coordinate	Location
9841	Farm House	Farm House		668.271	232.558	47.240411°N 8.340324°E
56	Catholic Church of St. Burkhard	Catholic Church of St. Burkhard		668.730	231.425	47.230173°N 8.346213°E
58	Horben Castle	Horben Castle		667.261	230.285	47.220071°N 8.326646°E
Unknown		ISOS Hamlets: Wiggwil				

== Beinwil am See ==
KGS No.^{?}	Picture	Name	Street Address	CH1903 X coordinate	CH1903 Y coordinate	Location
Unknown		Ägelmoos, Bronze Age Settlement				

== Besenbüren ==
KGS No.^{?}	Picture	Name	Street Address	CH1903 X coordinate	CH1903 Y coordinate	Location
9843	Speicher (Warehouse)	Speicher (Warehouse)	Zentralstrasse	668.412	240.714	47.313751°N 8.343428°E

== Biberstein ==
KGS No.^{?}	Picture	Name	Street Address	CH1903 X coordinate	CH1903 Y coordinate	Location
Unknown		ISOS special case: Biberstein				

== Birr ==
KGS No.^{?}	Picture	Name	Street Address	CH1903 X coordinate	CH1903 Y coordinate	Location
64	Grave of Heinrich Pestalozzi	Grave of Heinrich Pestalozzi	Pestalozzistrasse 2	657.575	254.284	47.436832°N 8.201856°E

== Boswil ==
KGS No.^{?}	Picture	Name	Street Address	CH1903 X coordinate	CH1903 Y coordinate	Location
68	Catholic Church of St. Pankraz	Catholic Church of St. Pankraz	Kirchweg	666.060	239.033	47.298872°N 8.312076°E
9846	Säge Weissenbach	Säge Weissenbach	Weissenbach 301	665.506	236.629	47.277306°N 8.304401°E
9845	House (residential house) no. 169	House (residential house) no. 169	Niesenbergstrasse 6	665.719	239.211	47.300507°N 8.307594°E
Unknown		ISOS Village: Boswil				

== Böttstein ==
KGS No.^{?}	Picture	Name	Street Address	CH1903 X coordinate	CH1903 Y coordinate	Location
9848	Öhlmühle (Oil Mill) Sägerei (Saw Mill)	Öhlmühle (Oil Mill); Sägerei (Saw Mill)		659.095	267.399	47.554647°N 8.223742°E
69	Castle Chapel	Castle Chapel	Schlossweg	659.141	267.448	47.555083°N 8.22436°E
Unknown		ISOS special case: Böttstein				

== Bözberg ==
KGS No.^{?}	Picture	Name	Street Address	CH1903 X coordinate	CH1903 Y coordinate	Location
Unknown		ISOS Dorf: Linn				
Unknown		ISOS Weiler: Ueberthal				
Unknown		ISOS Spezialfall: Kirchbözberg				

== Bremgarten (AG) ==
KGS No.^{?}	Picture	Name	Street Address	CH1903 X coordinate	CH1903 Y coordinate	Location
71	Former Muri Administration Building	Former Muri Administration Building	Antonigasse 2	668.183	244.831	47.350802°N 8.341025°E
9402		Additional Construction of the Muri Administration Building	Antonigasse 4	668.206	244.835	47.350836°N 8.34133°E
76	Church Complex with the Catholic City Church and St. Klara Chapel, St. Anna-Chapel and Muttergottes Chapel	Church Complex with the Catholic City Church and St. Klara Chapel, St. Anna-Chapel and Muttergottes Chapel	Pfarrgasse / Kirchgasse	668.113	244.949	47.351871°N 8.340117°E
80	Schlössli	Schlössli	Schlossgässli 2	668.375	244.946	47.351817°N 8.343583°E
10416	City Fortifications	City Fortifications		667.960	244.830	47.350816°N 8.338074°E
9403	Weissenbach House	Weissenbach House	Antonigasse 24	668.318	244.798	47.350491°N 8.342807°E
119	Benedictine Convent of St. Martin	Benedictine Convent of St. Martin	Hermetschwil-Staffeln	668.574	242.983	47.334141°N 8.345917°E
9858	Former Gasthaus (Combination Hotel and Restaurant)	Former Gasthaus (Combination Hotel and Restaurant)	Dorfstrasse 9, Hermetschwil-Staffeln	668.470	242.733	47.331903°N 8.344503°E
Unknown		ISOS Town: Bremgarten (AG)				

== Brugg ==
KGS No.^{?}	Picture	Name	Street Address	CH1903 X coordinate	CH1903 Y coordinate	Location
93	Schlössli	Schlössli	Im Hof 11, Altenburg bei Brugg	656.950	259.300	47.481998°N 8.194211°E
87	Former Lateinschule (former Latin school)	Former Lateinschule (former Latin school)	Kirchplatz 8	657.784	259.672	47.485271°N 8.205324°E
92	Swiss Reformed City Church	Swiss Reformed City Church	Kirchplatz	657.805	259.656	47.485126°N 8.2056°E
94	Schwarzer Turm (Black Tower)	Schwarzer Turm (Black Tower)	Rathausplatz 2	657.880	259.753	47.485991°N 8.206608°E
8506	Vindonissa-Museum	Vindonissa-Museum	Museumsstrasse 1	657.811	259.569	47.484343°N 8.205668°E
10415	Altenburg, Late Roman Castle	Altenburg, Late Roman Castle	Im Hof 11, below the Schlössli			
Unknown		ISOS City: Brugg				

== Büttikon ==
KGS No.^{?}	Picture	Name	Street Address	CH1903 X coordinate	CH1903 Y coordinate	Location
99	Koch House	Koch House	Sarmenstorferstrasse 9	662.733	241.954	47.325468°N 8.268498°E

== Densbüren ==
KGS No.^{?}	Picture	Name	Street Address	CH1903 X coordinate	CH1903 Y coordinate	Location
100	Ruins of Urgiz Castle	Ruins of Urgiz Castle		646.230	256.840	47.460715°N 8.051737°E

== Dietwil ==
KGS No.^{?}	Picture	Name	Street Address	CH1903 X coordinate	CH1903 Y coordinate	Location
101	Catholic Parish Church	Catholic Parish Church	Vorderdorfstrasse	672.369	222.277	47.147507°N 8.392792°E

== Effingen ==
KGS No.^{?}	Picture	Name	Street Address	CH1903 X coordinate	CH1903 Y coordinate	Location
Unknown		ISOS Village: Effingen				

== Endingen ==
KGS No.^{?}	Picture	Name	Street Address	CH1903 X coordinate	CH1903 Y coordinate	Location
103	Judenfriedhof (Jewish Cemetery)	Judenfriedhof (Jewish Cemetery)	Hauptstrasse	665.550	265.050	47.532909°N 8.309147°E
104	Synagoge Endingen	Synagoge Endingen	Hintersieg	664.084	265.469	47.536822°N 8.28974°E
Unknown		ISOS special case: Endingen				
Unknown		ISOS Dorf: Unterendingen				

== Fisibach ==
KGS No.^{?}	Picture	Name	Street Address	CH1903 X coordinate	CH1903 Y coordinate	Location
11658		Bleiche, Part of the late-Roman era Rhine Fortifications		672.850	269.650	47.573509°N 8.406836°E

== Fischbach-Göslikon ==
KGS No.^{?}	Picture	Name	Street Address	CH1903 X coordinate	CH1903 Y coordinate	Location
107	Catholic Parish Church of Maria Himmelfahrt	Catholic Parish Church of Maria Himmelfahrt	Mellingerstrasse	665.379	247.405	47.374236°N 8.304293°E

== Frick ==
KGS No.^{?}	Picture	Name	Street Address	CH1903 X coordinate	CH1903 Y coordinate	Location
109	Catholic Church of St. Peter and Paul and Ossuary	Catholic Church of St. Peter and Paul and Ossuary	Rampart	643.990	261.686	47.504452°N 8.022509°E
Unknown		ISOS Verstädtertes Dorf: Frick				

== Full-Reuenthal ==
KGS No.^{?}	Picture	Name	Street Address	CH1903 X coordinate	CH1903 Y coordinate	Location
11660		Jüppe, Part of the late-Roman era Rhine Fortifications		658.200	274.550	47.619037°N 8.212789°E

== Geltwil ==
KGS No.^{?}	Picture	Name	Street Address	CH1903 X coordinate	CH1903 Y coordinate	Location
111	House	House	Isenbergschwilerstrasse 37	668.100	233.061	47.244952°N 8.338142°E

== Gipf-Oberfrick ==
KGS No.^{?}	Picture	Name	Street Address	CH1903 X coordinate	CH1903 Y coordinate	Location
112		Ruins of Alt-Thierstein Castle		640.240	260.820	47.496903°N 7.972659°E

== Gontenschwil ==
KGS No.^{?}	Picture	Name	Street Address	CH1903 X coordinate	CH1903 Y coordinate	Location
9856	House «Fischerhübel»	House «Fischerhübel»	Fischerhübel 200	653.504	235.540	47.268592°N 8.145656°E

== Gränichen ==
KGS No.^{?}	Picture	Name	Street Address	CH1903 X coordinate	CH1903 Y coordinate	Location
114	Swiss Reformed Church	Swiss Reformed Church	Kirchweg	650.132	245.285	47.356505°N 8.102188°E
116	Untervogthaus	Untervogthaus	Lochgasse	649.756	245.468	47.358179°N 8.097231°E

== Habsburg ==
KGS No.^{?}	Picture	Name	Street Address	CH1903 X coordinate	CH1903 Y coordinate	Location
117	Habsburg	Habsburg	Schlossgasse 30	655.944	257.125	47.462524°N 8.180592°E

== Hellikon ==
KGS No.^{?}	Picture	Name	Street Address	CH1903 X coordinate	CH1903 Y coordinate	Location
Unknown		ISOS Dorf: Hellikon				

== Hendschiken ==
KGS No.^{?}	Picture	Name	Street Address	CH1903 X coordinate	CH1903 Y coordinate	Location
9857	Thatched Roof House	Thatched Roof House	Bühlhofstrasse 4	658.380	247.807	47.378509°N 8.211681°E

== Herznach ==
KGS No.^{?}	Picture	Name	Street Address	CH1903 X coordinate	CH1903 Y coordinate	Location
120	Roman Catholic Church of St. Nikolaus with its Mortuary and Church Treasure	Roman Catholic Church of St. Nikolaus with its Mortuary and Church Treasure	Kirchweg	646.065	258.160	47.472598°N 8.049685°E
Unknown		ISOS Dorf: Herznach				

== Hornussen ==
KGS No.^{?}	Picture	Name	Street Address	CH1903 X coordinate	CH1903 Y coordinate	Location
9480	Former Säckinger Administration House	Former Säckinger Administration House	Hauptstrasse 37	647.048	261.236	47.500193°N 8.063048°E
Unknown		ISOS Dorf: Hornussen				

== Hunzenschwil ==
KGS No.^{?}	Picture	Name	Street Address	CH1903 X coordinate	CH1903 Y coordinate	Location
9535		Ziegelmatte / Zotzelacker, Roman era brickyard		652.000	249.150	47.391122°N 8.12736°E

== Jonen ==
KGS No.^{?}	Picture	Name	Street Address	CH1903 X coordinate	CH1903 Y coordinate	Location
125	Pilgrimage Chapel	Pilgrimage Chapel	Jonental	673.560	239.360	47.301019°N 8.411285°E
Unknown		ISOS Dorf: Jonen				
Unknown		ISOS Weiler: Obschlagen / Litzi				

== Kaiseraugst ==
KGS No.^{?}	Picture	Name	Street Address	CH1903 X coordinate	CH1903 Y coordinate	Location
128	Augusta Raurica, Roman era City / Late Roman Castle	Augusta Raurica, Roman era City / Late Roman Castle		621.360	265.470	47.539609°N 7.72233°E
Unknown		ISOS Dorf: Kaiseraugst				

== Kaiserstuhl ==
KGS No.^{?}	Picture	Name	Street Address	CH1903 X coordinate	CH1903 Y coordinate	Location
133	Administration Building of St. Blasien Monastery	Administration Building of St. Blasien Monastery	Hauptstrasse 35	673.745	269.170	47.569092°N 8.41865°E
136		Mayenfisch- or Marschall House	Rheingasse 5	673.727	269.204	47.5694°N 8.418417°E
137	Oberer Turm, (Upper Tower)	Oberer Turm, (Upper Tower)	(Vorstadt) Lindengut	673.733	269.004	47.567601°N 8.418463°E
9860	Fortifications	Fortifications		673.750	269.010	47.567653°N 8.41869°E
Unknown		ISOS Kleinstadt / Flecken: Kaiserstuhl				

== Kaisten ==
KGS No.^{?}	Picture	Name	Street Address	CH1903 X coordinate	CH1903 Y coordinate	Location
Unknown		ISOS Dorf: Ittenthal				

== Kallern ==
KGS No.^{?}	Picture	Name	Street Address	CH1903 X coordinate	CH1903 Y coordinate	Location
9861	Farm House	Farm House	Unterniesenberg 45	664.260	239.596	47.304113°N 8.288359°E

== Klingnau ==
KGS No.^{?}	Picture	Name	Street Address	CH1903 X coordinate	CH1903 Y coordinate	Location
140	Former Provost's House of St. Blasien Monastery	Former Provost's House of St. Blasien Monastery	Propsteistrasse 1	661.999	270.250	47.580019°N 8.262718°E
Unknown		ISOS Kleinstadt / Flecken: Klingnau				

== Koblenz ==
KGS No.^{?}	Picture	Name	Street Address	CH1903 X coordinate	CH1903 Y coordinate	Location
10514	Koblenz–Felsenau railway bridge (Shared with Leuggern)	Koblenz–Felsenau railway bridge (Shared with Leuggern)		658.845	272.177	47.597639°N 8.221053°E
9072	Koblenz–Waldshut railway bridge	Koblenz–Waldshut railway bridge		659.820	273.460	47.609089°N 8.234189°E
142		Kleiner Laufen, Part of the late-Roman era Rhine Fortifications		661.380	274.040	47.614161°N 8.255014°E

== Kölliken ==
KGS No.^{?}	Picture	Name	Street Address	CH1903 X coordinate	CH1903 Y coordinate	Location
9864	Strohdachhaus Dorfmuseum, Thatched-Roof-House Museum	Strohdachhaus Dorfmuseum, Thatched-Roof-House Museum	Hauptstrasse 43	644.287	242.796	47.334537°N 8.02458°E
143	Thatched Roof House	Thatched Roof House	Schönenwerderstrasse 6	644.208	243.169	47.337897°N 8.023571°E

== Künten ==
KGS No.^{?}	Picture	Name	Street Address	CH1903 X coordinate	CH1903 Y coordinate	Location
9865	Mill	Mill	Mühlegasse 2	667.249	249.005	47.388438°N 8.329291°E

== Laufenburg ==
KGS No.^{?}	Picture	Name	Street Address	CH1903 X coordinate	CH1903 Y coordinate	Location
147		Courthouse	Gerichtsgasse 86	646.738	268.038	47.561389°N 8.059648°E
149	Catholic Parish Church	Catholic Parish Church		646.880	268.100	47.561937°N 8.061541°E
8985	Powerplant of Laufenburg	Powerplant of Laufenburg	Dorf	645.930	267.420	47.555888°N 8.048849°E
152; 11674	Ruins of Laufenburg Castle and Schlossberg, Part of the late-Roman era Rhine Fortifications	Ruins of Laufenburg Castle and Schlossberg, Part of the late-Roman era Rhine Fortifications		646.830	268.060	47.56158°N 8.060873°E
Unknown		ISOS Kleinstadt / Flecken: Laufenburg				

== Leimbach ==
KGS No.^{?}	Picture	Name	Street Address	CH1903 X coordinate	CH1903 Y coordinate	Location
155	Straw Thatched House	Straw Thatched House	Seeberg	655.611	236.450	47.276603°N 8.173609°E

== Lengnau ==
KGS No.^{?}	Picture	Name	Street Address	CH1903 X coordinate	CH1903 Y coordinate	Location
156	Synagoge	Synagoge	Zürichstrasse	667.180	263.740	47.520964°N 8.330594°E
Unknown		ISOS Weiler: Husen				
Unknown		ISOS Weiler: Vogelsang				
Unknown		ISOS Spezialfall: Lengnau				

== Lenzburg ==
KGS No.^{?}	Picture	Name	Street Address	CH1903 X coordinate	CH1903 Y coordinate	Location
10464	Castle Hill	Castle Hill	Schlossgasse 21	656.196	248.589	47.385732°N 8.182861°E
Unknown	Goffersberg, Neolithic Graves	Goffersberg, Neolithic Graves		656.490	248.715	47.38684°N 8.18677°E
158	Lindfeld, Roman era Vicus	Lindfeld, Roman era Vicus		656.780	249.420	47.393156°N 8.1907°E
162	Müller House	Müller House	Bleicherain 7	655.622	248.625	47.386104°N 8.175264°E
165	Rathaus (Town council house)	Rathaus (Town council house)	Rathausgasse 16	655.993	248.763	47.387314°N 8.180195°E
159; 8492	Castle and Prehistoric Settlement with Historical Museum of Aargau	Castle and Prehistoric Settlement with Historical Museum of Aargau	Schloss 1	656.379	248.790	47.387524°N 8.18531°E
9871	Sonnenberg (former Landweibelei)	Sonnenberg (former Landweibelei)	Schlossgasse 50	656.446	248.614	47.385935°N 8.186175°E
8992	Prison	Prison	Ziegeleiweg 13	655.858	247.935	47.379878°N 8.178304°E
9873	Villa Malaga	Villa Malaga	Schützenmattstrasse 7	656.127	249.002	47.389452°N 8.181999°E
Unknown		ISOS Kleinstadt / Flecken: Lenzburg				

== Leuggern ==
KGS No.^{?}	Picture	Name	Street Address	CH1903 X coordinate	CH1903 Y coordinate	Location
9875	Railway Bridge Koblenz-Felsenau (Shared with Koblenz)	Railway Bridge Koblenz-Felsenau (Shared with Koblenz)		658.845	272.177	47.597639°N 8.221053°E
Unknown		Im Sand-Felsenau, Part of the late-Roman era Rhine Fortifications		658.860	273.640	47.610795°N 8.221446°E
11675		ISOS Weiler: Hettenschwil				

== Leutwil ==
KGS No.^{?}	Picture	Name	Street Address	CH1903 X coordinate	CH1903 Y coordinate	Location
9876	Farm House Baumann	Farm House Baumann	Zopfweg 2	655.535	240.295	47.311192°N 8.17308°E

== Magden ==
KGS No.^{?}	Picture	Name	Street Address	CH1903 X coordinate	CH1903 Y coordinate	Location
9539		Strick, Paleolithic / Neolithic Settlement		629.200	264.850	47.533731°N 7.826415°E

== Mandach ==
KGS No.^{?}	Picture	Name	Street Address	CH1903 X coordinate	CH1903 Y coordinate	Location
Unknown		ISOS Dorf: Mandach				

== Meisterschwanden ==
KGS No.^{?}	Picture	Name	Street Address	CH1903 X coordinate	CH1903 Y coordinate	Location
Unknown		Villa Fischer	Kirchrain 11	659.963	238.473	47.294417°N 8.231393°E
169		ISOS Spezialfall: Meisterschwanden				

== Mellingen ==
KGS No.^{?}	Picture	Name	Street Address	CH1903 X coordinate	CH1903 Y coordinate	Location
175	Ibergerhof	Ibergerhof	Kleine Kirchgasse 11	663.125	252.211	47.41768°N 8.275129°E
177	City Walls	City Walls		663.000	252.350	47.418942°N 8.273492°E
Unknown		ISOS Kleinstadt / Flecken: Mellingen				

== Menziken ==
KGS No.^{?}	Picture	Name	Street Address	CH1903 X coordinate	CH1903 Y coordinate	Location
180	Villa Mathys	Villa Mathys	Hofmattpark 1 A	657.156	231.930	47.235817°N 8.193453°E

== Merenschwand ==
KGS No.^{?}	Picture	Name	Street Address	CH1903 X coordinate	CH1903 Y coordinate	Location
181	Gasthof «Zum Schwanen»	Gasthof «Zum Schwanen»	Bremgartenstrasse 2	670.814	234.757	47.259921°N 8.374254°E
182	Catholic Parish Church	Catholic Parish Church	Kirchplatz	670.914	234.787	47.26018°N 8.375579°E
Unknown		ISOS Dorf: Merenschwand				

== Mettauertal ==
KGS No.^{?}	Picture	Name	Street Address	CH1903 X coordinate	CH1903 Y coordinate	Location
123	Hottwil, Former Untervogtei with Outbuildings	Hottwil, Former Untervogtei with Outbuildings	Leumenstrasse 41	654.348	266.538	47.547313°N 8.160574°E
184	Catholic Parish Church	Catholic Parish Church	Mettau, Hauptstrasse	651.740	268.400	47.56427°N 8.126149°E

== Möhlin ==
KGS No.^{?}	Picture	Name	Street Address	CH1903 X coordinate	CH1903 Y coordinate	Location
9877	Bata Area	Bata Area	Batastrasse 719, 743	630.200	268.876	47.569894°N 7.839968°E
11752	Fahrgraben, Part of the late-Roman era Rhine Fortifications	Fahrgraben, Part of the late-Roman era Rhine Fortifications		632.700	270.850	47.587528°N 7.873335°E
185	Riburg «Bürkli», Part of the late-Roman era Rhine Fortifications	Riburg «Bürkli», Part of the late-Roman era Rhine Fortifications		630.100	270.080	47.580727°N 7.838721°E
11753		Untere Wehren, Part of the late-Roman era Rhine Fortifications		634.075	270.750	47.586558°N 7.891606°E

== Möriken-Wildegg ==
KGS No.^{?}	Picture	Name	Street Address	CH1903 X coordinate	CH1903 Y coordinate	Location
9878		Gasthof Bären	Bruggerstrasse 19	655.018	252.136	47.417732°N 8.167698°E
9732	Catholic Church of St. Antonius	Catholic Church of St. Antonius	Stroheggstrasse	655.277	251.926	47.415822°N 8.171103°E
188	Kestenberg, Bronze Age Hilltop Settlement	Kestenberg, Bronze Age Hilltop Settlement		657.530	252.870	47.424119°N 8.201077°E
189	Wildegg Castle (Part of the Swiss National Museums)	Wildegg Castle (Part of the Swiss National Museums)	Effingerweg 5, 6, 8	655.217	252.466	47.420683°N 8.170375°E
8605		ISOS Spezialfall: Wildegg				

== Mumpf ==
KGS No.^{?}	Picture	Name	Street Address	CH1903 X coordinate	CH1903 Y coordinate	Location
9562		Chapf, Prehistoric Settlement		636.290	265.930	47.543091°N 7.920657°E
9563	Gasthaus (Combination Hotel and Restaurant) Anker, Built on the site of a Late-Roman Castle, Part of the Rhine Fortifications	Gasthaus (Combination Hotel and Restaurant) Anker, Built on the site of a Late-Roman Castle, Part of the Rhine Fortifications		635.950	266.350	47.546887°N 7.916175°E

== Muri ==
KGS No.^{?}	Picture	Name	Street Address	CH1903 X coordinate	CH1903 Y coordinate	Location
194	Former Benedictine Abbey	Former Benedictine Abbey	Marktstrasse	668.049	236.399	47.27498°N 8.337973°E
9498	Leontiusbrunnen (Fountain)	Leontiusbrunnen (Fountain)	Leontiusplatz	667.969	236.395	47.274952°N 8.336915°E
195	The so-called Klosterscheune	The so-called Klosterscheune	Klosterhof 197	668.060	236.657	47.277299°N 8.338158°E
9883		Granary	Hasli 233	668.331	237.565	47.285438°N 8.341877°E
Unknown		ISOS Weiler: Hasli				

== Niederlenz ==
KGS No.^{?}	Picture	Name	Street Address	CH1903 X coordinate	CH1903 Y coordinate	Location
9884	Former Tithe barn of Lenzburg Castle	Former Tithe barn of Lenzburg Castle	Dorfrain 9	655.616	250.365	47.401754°N 8.175401°E

== Niederwil ==
KGS No.^{?}	Picture	Name	Street Address	CH1903 X coordinate	CH1903 Y coordinate	Location
197	Former Cistercian Nuns Convent of Gnadenthal	Former Cistercian Nuns Convent of Gnadenthal	Gnadenthalerstrasse	665.240	249.556	47.393595°N 8.302766°E

== Oberkulm ==
KGS No.^{?}	Picture	Name	Street Address	CH1903 X coordinate	CH1903 Y coordinate	Location
201	Granary	Granary	Im Obersteg 106	651.761	238.465	47.295039°N 8.122961°E

== Oberlunkhofen ==
KGS No.^{?}	Picture	Name	Street Address	CH1903 X coordinate	CH1903 Y coordinate	Location
202	Catholic Parish Church	Catholic Parish Church	Chileweg	671.918	240.606	47.312407°N 8.389775°E

== Obersiggenthal ==
KGS No.^{?}	Picture	Name	Street Address	CH1903 X coordinate	CH1903 Y coordinate	Location
10408	Tithe barn	Tithe barn	Kirchweg 14	664.527	260.043	47.487981°N 8.294838°E
Unknown		ISOS Dorf: Kirchdorf				

== Oftringen ==
KGS No.^{?}	Picture	Name	Street Address	CH1903 X coordinate	CH1903 Y coordinate	Location
207	Ruins of Alt-Wartburg Castle	Ruins of Alt-Wartburg Castle		636.310	242.610	47.333351°N 7.919027°E

== Olsberg ==
KGS No.^{?}	Picture	Name	Street Address	CH1903 X coordinate	CH1903 Y coordinate	Location
208	Former Cistercian Nuns Convent with Church and Outbuildings	Former Cistercian Nuns Convent with Church and Outbuildings		625.245	263.745	47.523957°N 7.77383°E

== Othmarsingen ==
KGS No.^{?}	Picture	Name	Street Address	CH1903 X coordinate	CH1903 Y coordinate	Location
209	Swiss Reformed Church	Swiss Reformed Church		658.500	250.040	47.398581°N 8.213562°E

== Rheinfelden ==
KGS No.^{?}	Picture	Name	Street Address	CH1903 X coordinate	CH1903 Y coordinate	Location
213	Feldschlösschen Brewery	Feldschlösschen Brewery	Feldschlösschenstrasse 34	626.130	266.260	47.546541°N 7.785728°E
214	Christian Catholic Collegiate church of St. Martin	Christian Catholic Collegiate church of St. Martin	Kirchgasse	626.650	267.110	47.554165°N 7.792687°E
9886	Former Gasthof zum goldenen Adler	Former Gasthof zum goldenen Adler	Obertorplatz 4	626.796	267.100	47.554069°N 7.794626°E
11754		Heimenholz, Part of the late-Roman era Rhine Fortifications		628.875	270.760	47.586898°N 7.822483°E
217	Johanniter Chapel	Johanniter Chapel	Johannitergasse 70	626.780	267.280	47.555689°N 7.794424°E
216	Pferrichgraben, Part of the late-Roman era Rhine Fortifications	Pferrichgraben, Part of the late-Roman era Rhine Fortifications		628.375	269.390	47.574598°N 7.815749°E
9888	City Walls and Fortifications	City Walls and Fortifications		626.700	267.100	47.554073°N 7.79335°E
Unknown		ISOS Kleinstadt / Flecken: Rheinfelden				

== Rümikon ==
KGS No.^{?}	Picture	Name	Street Address	CH1903 X coordinate	CH1903 Y coordinate	Location
226		Sandgraben, Part of the late-Roman era Rhine Fortifications		671.700	269.500	47.572287°N 8.39153°E

== Rupperswil ==
KGS No.^{?}	Picture	Name	Street Address	CH1903 X coordinate	CH1903 Y coordinate	Location
Unknown		ISOS Spezialfall: Fabrikanlage Rupperswil				

== Sarmenstorf ==
KGS No.^{?}	Picture	Name	Street Address	CH1903 X coordinate	CH1903 Y coordinate	Location
231		Zigiholz, Neolithic Graves		662.430	240.250	47.310171°N 8.264253°E

== Schafisheim ==
KGS No.^{?}	Picture	Name	Street Address	CH1903 X coordinate	CH1903 Y coordinate	Location
233	Urech House	Urech House	Seetalstrasse 27	653.044	248.038	47.381037°N 8.141055°E
234	Schlössli	Schlössli	Lenzburgerstrasse 5, 7	653.259	247.721	47.378169°N 8.143864°E

== Schinznach-Bad ==
KGS No.^{?}	Picture	Name	Street Address	CH1903 X coordinate	CH1903 Y coordinate	Location
Unknown		ISOS Spezialfall: Bad Schinznach				

== Schinznach ==
KGS No.^{?}	Picture	Name	Street Address	CH1903 X coordinate	CH1903 Y coordinate	Location
237	Swiss Reformed Church with Erlach-Chapel	Swiss Reformed Church with Erlach-Chapel	Kirchgasse	653.080	255.300	47.446348°N 8.142394°E
Unknown		ISOS Dorf: Schinznach Village				
Unknown		ISOS Dorf: Oberflachs				

== Schöftland ==
KGS No.^{?}	Picture	Name	Street Address	CH1903 X coordinate	CH1903 Y coordinate	Location
242		Schöftland Castle	Bahnhofstrasse 5	646.222	239.458	47.304382°N 8.049836°E
Unknown		ISOS Verstädtertes Dorf: Schöftland				

== Schupfart ==
KGS No.^{?}	Picture	Name	Street Address	CH1903 X coordinate	CH1903 Y coordinate	Location
243	Herrain, An Earthen Fortification	Herrain, An Earthen Fortification		639.760	262.880	47.51546°N 7.966473°E

== Schwaderloch ==
KGS No.^{?}	Picture	Name	Street Address	CH1903 X coordinate	CH1903 Y coordinate	Location
244		Oberes Bürgli, Part of the late-Roman era Rhine Fortifications		653.420	271.300	47.590216°N 8.14882°E
245		Unteres Bürgli, Part of the late-Roman era Rhine Fortifications		652.700	270.500	47.583079°N 8.139153°E

== Seengen ==
KGS No.^{?}	Picture	Name	Street Address	CH1903 X coordinate	CH1903 Y coordinate	Location
246		Risi, Late-Bronze Age Lake Shore Settlement	Moos / Aabach	657.750	241.000	47.317342°N 8.202462°E
9469	Brestenberg Castle	Brestenberg Castle	Brestenbergstrasse 8	658.172	241.276	47.319788°N 8.208079°E
247	Hallwyl Castle	Hallwyl Castle		657.130	241.640	47.323153°N 8.194344°E
9898	Schlossmühle (Castle's Mill)	Schlossmühle (Castle's Mill)	Boniswilerstrasse 38	657.076	241.702	47.323715°N 8.193638°E

== Seon ==
KGS No.^{?}	Picture	Name	Street Address	CH1903 X coordinate	CH1903 Y coordinate	Location
9899	Former Untere Mühle	Former Untere Mühle	Unterdorfstrasse 50	654.579	244.484	47.348948°N 8.160948°E
9470	Villa Walti	Villa Walti	Oberdorfstrasse 28	654.304	244.288	47.347207°N 8.157285°E

== Sins ==
KGS No.^{?}	Picture	Name	Street Address	CH1903 X coordinate	CH1903 Y coordinate	Location
9276	Former Administration Building	Former Administration Building	Meienberg / Stadtplatz 2	670.943	227.838	47.197677°N 8.374867°E
252	Municipal Building (former Rectory)	Municipal Building (former Rectory)	Kirchstrasse 14	672.471	227.443	47.193959°N 8.394967°E
10485	Ruins of Meienberg	Ruins of Meienberg		671.000	227.800	47.19733°N 8.375614°E

== Spreitenbach ==
KGS No.^{?}	Picture	Name	Street Address	CH1903 X coordinate	CH1903 Y coordinate	Location
9534		Moosweg, Neolithic Grave		671.760	252.655	47.420788°N 8.389616°E

== Staufen ==
KGS No.^{?}	Picture	Name	Street Address	CH1903 X coordinate	CH1903 Y coordinate	Location
256	Staufberg Church Complex	Staufberg Church Complex		654.670	248.000	47.380563°N 8.162581°E

== Stein ==
KGS No.^{?}	Picture	Name	Street Address	CH1903 X coordinate	CH1903 Y coordinate	Location
257	Wooden Bridge	Wooden Bridge	Schaffhauserstrasse	638.488	266.275	47.546069°N 7.94988°E

== Suhr ==
KGS No.^{?}	Picture	Name	Street Address	CH1903 X coordinate	CH1903 Y coordinate	Location
9731	Catholic Heiliggeist Parish church	Catholic Heiliggeist Parish church	Tramstrasse	648.298	247.591	47.377382°N 8.078162°E

== Sulz ==
KGS No.^{?}	Picture	Name	Street Address	CH1903 X coordinate	CH1903 Y coordinate	Location
259		Rheinsulz, Part of the late-Roman era Rhine Fortifications		648.970	267.530	47.556658°N 8.089247°E

== Tegerfelden ==
KGS No.^{?}	Picture	Name	Street Address	CH1903 X coordinate	CH1903 Y coordinate	Location
261	So-called Gerichtshaus (Former Meierhof)	So-called Gerichtshaus (Former Meierhof)		663.778	268.323	47.562519°N 8.286086°E
Unknown		ISOS Dorf: Tegerfelden				

== Thalheim ==
KGS No.^{?}	Picture	Name	Street Address	CH1903 X coordinate	CH1903 Y coordinate	Location
262	Ruins of Schenkenberg castle	Ruins of Schenkenberg castle		649.940	254.780	47.441916°N 8.100706°E
Unknown		ISOS Dorf: Thalheim (AG)				

== Unterkulm ==
KGS No.^{?}	Picture	Name	Street Address	CH1903 X coordinate	CH1903 Y coordinate	Location
266	Swiss Reformed Church	Swiss Reformed Church	Hauptstrasse	651.180	240.180	47.31051°N 8.115476°E

== Unterlunkhofen ==
KGS No.^{?}	Picture	Name	Street Address	CH1903 X coordinate	CH1903 Y coordinate	Location
267	Bärhau, Iron Age Burial Mounds	Bärhau, Iron Age Burial Mounds		672.660	241.840	47.323424°N 8.399787°E

== Untersiggenthal ==
KGS No.^{?}	Picture	Name	Street Address	CH1903 X coordinate	CH1903 Y coordinate	Location
269	Ruins of Freudenau Castle	Ruins of Freudenau Castle		659.910	262.700	47.512313°N 8.233937°E
270		Heidenküche, Neolithic / Bronze Age Settlement		662.160	261.760	47.503651°N 8.263672°E

== Veltheim ==
KGS No.^{?}	Picture	Name	Street Address	CH1903 X coordinate	CH1903 Y coordinate	Location
Unknown		ISOS Dorf: Veltheim				

== Villigen ==
KGS No.^{?}	Picture	Name	Street Address	CH1903 X coordinate	CH1903 Y coordinate	Location
Unknown		ISOS Dorf: Villigen				

== Villmergen ==
KGS No.^{?}	Picture	Name	Street Address	CH1903 X coordinate	CH1903 Y coordinate	Location
9900	Farm House	Farm House	Halde 2	660.496	244.600	47.349475°N 8.239265°E
9901	Main Building of the Former Bally Factory	Main Building of the Former Bally Factory	Bahnhofstrasse 66	660.058	247.496	47.375561°N 8.233857°E
121	Hilfikon Castle and Chapel	Hilfikon Castle and Chapel	Schloss 21	661.097	242.518	47.330694°N 8.246935°E
275	Catholic Parish Church	Catholic Parish Church	Kirchgasse	660.835	244.199	47.345837°N 8.243697°E

== Villnachern ==
KGS No.^{?}	Picture	Name	Street Address	CH1903 X coordinate	CH1903 Y coordinate	Location
9902	Tithe barn	Tithe barn	Vorstadt 2	654.475	258.118	47.471578°N 8.161232°E

== Wallbach ==
KGS No.^{?}	Picture	Name	Street Address	CH1903 X coordinate	CH1903 Y coordinate	Location
11755		Businger House, Part of the late-Roman era Rhine Fortifications		635.130	267.725	47.559297°N 7.905391°E
276	Stelli, Part of the late-Roman era Rhine Fortifications	Stelli, Part of the late-Roman era Rhine Fortifications		635.220	269.290	47.573367°N 7.906711°E
Unknown		ISOS Dorf: Wallbach				

== Wegenstetten ==
KGS No.^{?}	Picture	Name	Street Address	CH1903 X coordinate	CH1903 Y coordinate	Location
Unknown		ISOS Dorf: Wegenstetten				

== Wettingen ==
KGS No.^{?}	Picture	Name	Street Address	CH1903 X coordinate	CH1903 Y coordinate	Location
278	Former Cistercian Monastery	Former Cistercian Monastery	Klosterstrasse 11	666.146	256.511	47.456055°N 8.315795°E
11732		Neolithic Stone-lined Graves		664.775	258.175	47.471157°N 8.297857°E
Unknown		ISOS Spezialfall: Limmatknie				

== Windisch ==
KGS No.^{?}	Picture	Name	Street Address	CH1903 X coordinate	CH1903 Y coordinate	Location
9027	Former Höhere Technische Lehranstalt	Former Höhere Technische Lehranstalt	Klosterzelgstrasse	658.372	259.045	47.479581°N 8.213043°E
287	Former Wool Spinning Factory Kunz	Former Wool Spinning Factory Kunz	Alte Spinnerei 4, 5	659.669	259.293	47.481695°N 8.230282°E
281	Former Königsfelden Abbey	Former Königsfelden Abbey		658.728	259.127	47.480286°N 8.217776°E
285	Psychiatric Clinic	Psychiatric Clinic	Königsfelden	658.550	259.244	47.481354°N 8.21543°E
284	Vindonissa, Celtic Oppidum / Roman era Legion Camp / Civilian Settlement	Vindonissa, Celtic Oppidum / Roman era Legion Camp / Civilian Settlement		658.900	259.200	47.480927°N 8.220067°E
Unknown		ISOS Spezialfall: Königsfelden				

== Wittnau ==
KGS No.^{?}	Picture	Name	Street Address	CH1903 X coordinate	CH1903 Y coordinate	Location
290		Ruins of Alt Homberg castle		640.270	260.170	47.491056°N 7.972999°E
289		Wittnauer Horn, Prehistoric Hilltop Settlement; Roman era / Early Middle Ages Fortification		639.280	259.240	47.482751°N 7.95978°E
Unknown		ISOS Dorf: Wittnau				

== Wölflinswil ==
KGS No.^{?}	Picture	Name	Street Address	CH1903 X coordinate	CH1903 Y coordinate	Location
Unknown		ISOS Dorf: Wölflinswil				

== Wohlen ==
KGS No.^{?}	Picture	Name	Street Address	CH1903 X coordinate	CH1903 Y coordinate	Location
9537	Häslerhau, Iron Age Burial Mounds	Häslerhau, Iron Age Burial Mounds		662.950	246.860	47.369571°N 8.272058°E
291		Hohbüehl, Iron Age Burial Mounds		663.360	246.700	47.368093°N 8.277463°E
295	Catholic Church of St. Leonhard	Catholic Church of St. Leonhard	Kirchenplatz	663.440	244.820	47.351177°N 8.278256°E

== Würenlingen ==
KGS No.^{?}	Picture	Name	Street Address	CH1903 X coordinate	CH1903 Y coordinate	Location
Unknown		ISOS Dorf: Würenlingen				

== Würenlos ==
KGS No.^{?}	Picture	Name	Street Address	CH1903 X coordinate	CH1903 Y coordinate	Location
298	Benedictine Women's Convent of Fahr	Benedictine Women's Convent of Fahr		675.500	251.300	47.408184°N 8.438945°E
300		Roman era Quarry		669.420	255.685	47.44829°N 8.359079°E
Unknown		ISOS Weiler: Oetlikon				
Unknown		ISOS Spezialfall: Monastery Fahr				

== Zeihen ==
KGS No.^{?}	Picture	Name	Street Address	CH1903 X coordinate	CH1903 Y coordinate	Location
Unknown		ISOS Weiler: Oberzeihen				

== Zeiningen ==
KGS No.^{?}	Picture	Name	Street Address	CH1903 X coordinate	CH1903 Y coordinate	Location
9540		Möhliner Feld, Prehistoric Objects		632.700	267.100	47.553802°N 7.87306°E

== Zofingen ==
KGS No.^{?}	Picture	Name	Street Address	CH1903 X coordinate	CH1903 Y coordinate	Location
307	Former Armory	Former Armory	General-Guisan-Strasse 12	638.518	237.695	47.289019°N 7.947817°E
8999	Former Siechenhaus (Quarantine house)	Former Siechenhaus (Quarantine house)	Aarburgerstrasse 21	637.877	238.185	47.293464°N 7.939385°E
308	Municipal School House	Municipal School House	General-Guisan-Strasse 14	638.507	237.797	47.289937°N 7.94768°E
10466	Heiternplatz	Heiternplatz		639.054	237.159	47.284167°N 7.954856°E
9561	Hirzeberg, Roman era Farm House with Mosaic Floors	Hirzeberg, Roman era Farm House with Mosaic Floors		638.670	237.020	47.282939°N 7.949768°E
9735	Klösterli	Klösterli	Klösterligasse 2	638.488	237.570	47.287897°N 7.94741°E
311		Museum	General-Guisan-Strasse 18	638.430	237.862	47.290527°N 7.946668°E
305	Rathaus (Town council house)	Rathaus (Town council house)	Rathausgasse 4	638.400	237.610	47.288262°N 7.94625°E
314		Sennenhof	Hintere Hauptstrasse 9, 14	638.351	237.768	47.289686°N 7.945616°E
9322		City Library of Zofingen	Hintere Hauptgasse 20	638.377	237.713	47.28919°N 7.945955°E
