= Meyerhoff =

Meyerhoff is a German surname, a phonetic variant of Meierhof or Meyerhof. Notable people with the surname include:

- Arthur Meyerhoff (1895–1986), advertising agency executive and entrepreneur
- Arthur A. Meyerhoff (1928–1994), American geologist
- Harvey Meyerhoff (1927–2023), American businessman and son of Joseph Meyerhoff
- Howard Meyerhoff (1899–1982), American geologist
- Joseph Meyerhoff (1899–1985), American businessman and philanthropist
- Otto Fritz Meyerhof (1884–1951), German-born physician and biochemist

== See also ==
- Joseph Meyerhoff Symphony Hall, or simply the Meyerhoff, a music venue in Baltimore, U.S., named for Joseph Meyerhoff
- Meyerhoff manifold, in hyperbolic geometry
- Myerhoff
