= Landvogtei Castle of Baden =

Castle in Baden, Aargau, Switzerland

Landvogteischloss Baden
- Baden
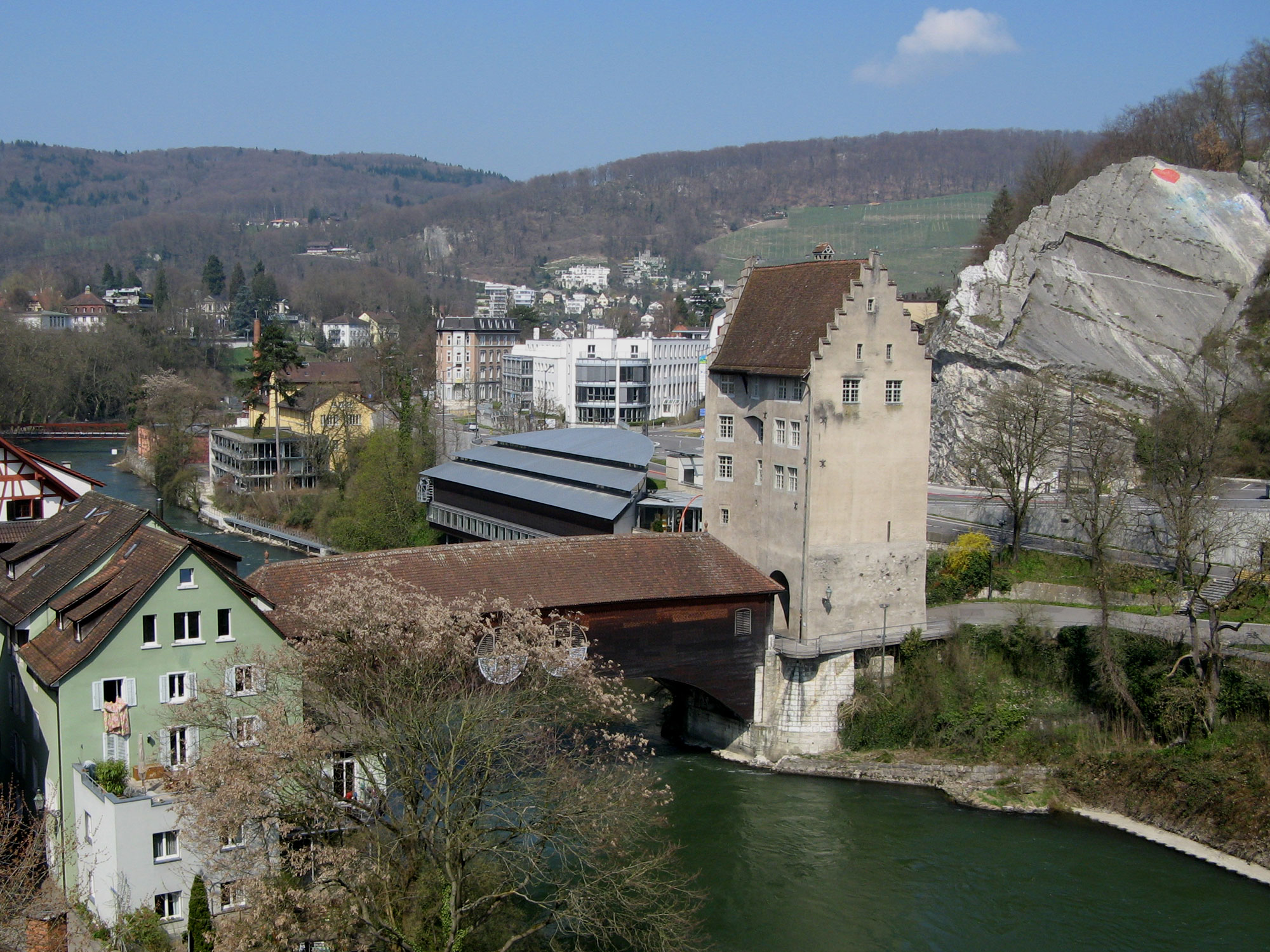
- Bailiff's castle and wooden bridge, behind it the new building of the Historical Museum

Site information
- Code: CH-AG
- Condition: preserved

Location
- Coordinates: 47°28′22.94″N 8°18′39.31″E

Site history
- Built: 1265

Landvogtei Castle (Landvogteischloss) is a small castle in the city of Baden in the Swiss canton of Aargau. It is located on the right bank of the Limmat River opposite the old town and once guarded the narrows between the Schlossberg to the west (with Stein Castle) and the Lägern to the east. Until 1798 it was the residence of the bailiff of the county of Baden. Today it houses the Baden Historical Museum and the archives of the city of Baden.

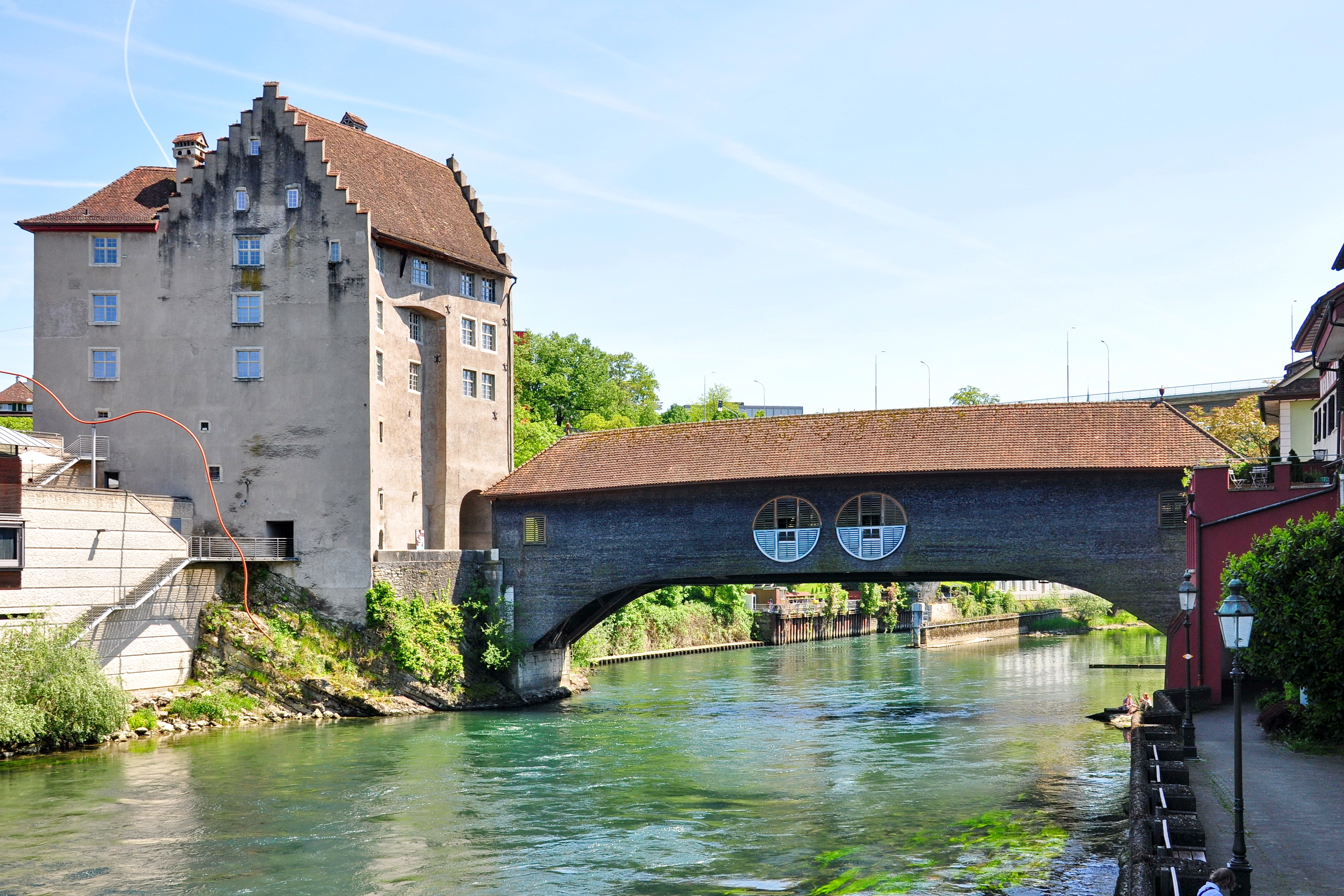
View from the Limmat to the castle and the bridge

== Building ==
The castle is located in a hollow at the narrowest point of the Baden valley, on the right bank of the Limmat near Lägerngrat. The covered wooden bridge leads to the old town on the left side of the river. Landvogtei Castle forms the lower-lying counterpart to the ruins of the stone on the Schlossberg, together with the city tower and the parish church of the Assumption of the Virgin Mary, it has a significant impact on the cityscape.

The core of the three-story castle is a keep built in the first half of the 12th century from quarry and pebble stones. Over the centuries, additions were built to this in three stages, resulting in a very irregular ground plan. The main wing, built around the castle tower and oriented in the north–south direction, has the shape of a folded ellipse. In its southern part there is a passage to the bridge, on the eastern facade there is a round stair tower ("Schneggen"). A short rhomboid-shaped wing adjoins to the northeast.

In 1992–1993 a modern extension was built on the north-west facade. It was designed by the architects Wilfrid and Katharina Steib and serves as an extension to the Baden Historical Museum. Due to its slightly curved shape, it is also called "melon slice" ("melonenschnitz"). The museum covers the history of the city from Roman times to the present day, including the development of the baths and industry. The archaeological finds of the region are also presented, as well as temporary exhibitions on cultural history. Attached to the museum is the city archive, where the documents of the city administration are kept from 1300; the archive rooms are underground.

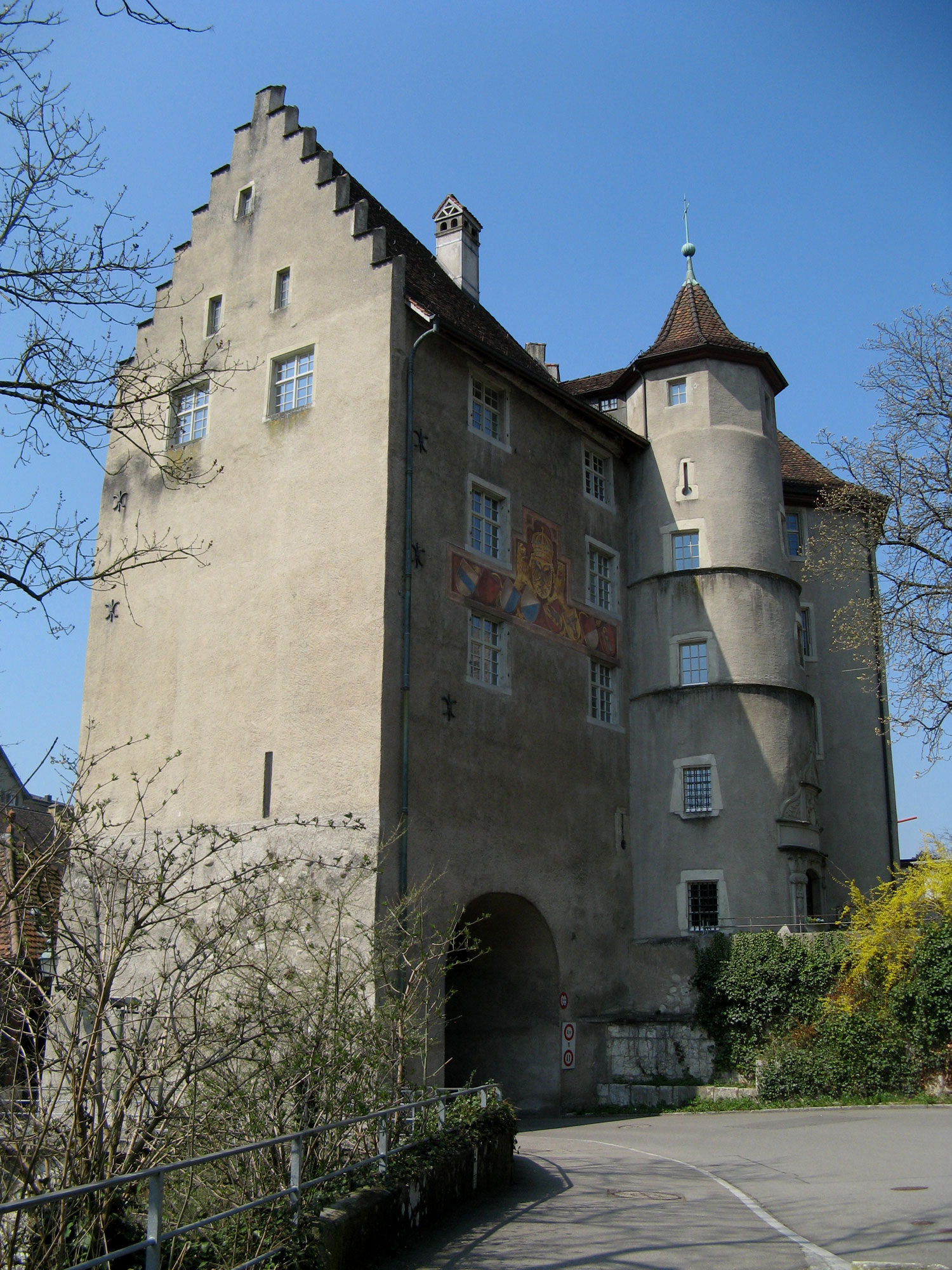
View from the southeast side with stair tower

== History ==
As a counterpart to Stein Castle, the count's administrative seat, the Niderhus was built on the opposite side of the river in the 12th century, first mentioned in 1265 as "Lower Fortress" (Niderhus). Initially, servants of the Counts of Lenzburg lived there. The building came into the possession of the Counts of Kyburg through inheritance in 1173. In 1264, the Habsburgs took over the management of the building, and nine years later they owned it entirely. When the city fortifications were expanded around 1360, the Niderhus was included as a bridgehead in the fortifications. Access to the bridge was through an archway, a wall led from the building to the Lägernkopf and thus completely sealed off the passage on the right bank of the Limmat.

When the Confederates conquered the Aargau in 1415, the Niderhus suffered considerable damage, but was then repaired. It served as the seat of the bailiff of the County of Baden. In 1484 there were plans to give up the dilapidated Niderhus and instead rebuild the destroyed Stein Castle. But finally, two years later, the decision was made in favor of the much more cost-effective option, the construction of a new building and the extension of the building on the Limmat to the "Landvogteischloss". The expansion was completed in 1490.

In the years 1533 to 1535 and 1549 to 1551, Aegidius Tschudi, who also became famous as a chronicler, was the head bailiff. In 1579–1580, a round stair tower was added to the east side. In 1690–1692, in the course of the expansion of the municipal fortifications, bastions with drop bridges were built directly next to the castle on the access roads to Ehrendingen and Wettingen, amid strong protests from Zurich, but with the approval of the Catholic towns. After the Second War of Villmergen of 1712, Zurich, Bern and Glarus shared the dominion. The bailiff and his staff were the only reformed inhabitants of Baden at that time. The bastions were demolished again. In 1733–1734 another wing was built on the northeast side.

After the French proclaimed the Helvetic Republic in 1798, the castle lost its purpose. In 1804, it came into the possession of the Canton of Aargau. Three years later it was bought by the city of Baden and used as a school building. After 1857 it served as a prison. Attempts to sell the increasingly dilapidated building at auction for a profit failed several times. Finally, in 1909–1912, the architect Otto Dorer carried out a comprehensive restoration in order to prepare the castle for its future function as a museum.
