= Meyerhof =

Meyerhof is a German surname. Other phonetic variants are Meierhof or Meyerhoff. Notable people with the surname include:

- Agnes Meyerhof
- Leonie Meyerhof (1858/60–1933), German writer, literary critic and women's rights activist
- Otto Fritz Meyerhof

== Fictional characters ==
Noel Meyerhof from the short story "Jokester" By Iaac Asimov
