= Synagogue of Baden, Aargau =

Orthodox synagogue in the canton of Aargau, Switzerland

Synagogue of Baden
- German: Synagoge Baden
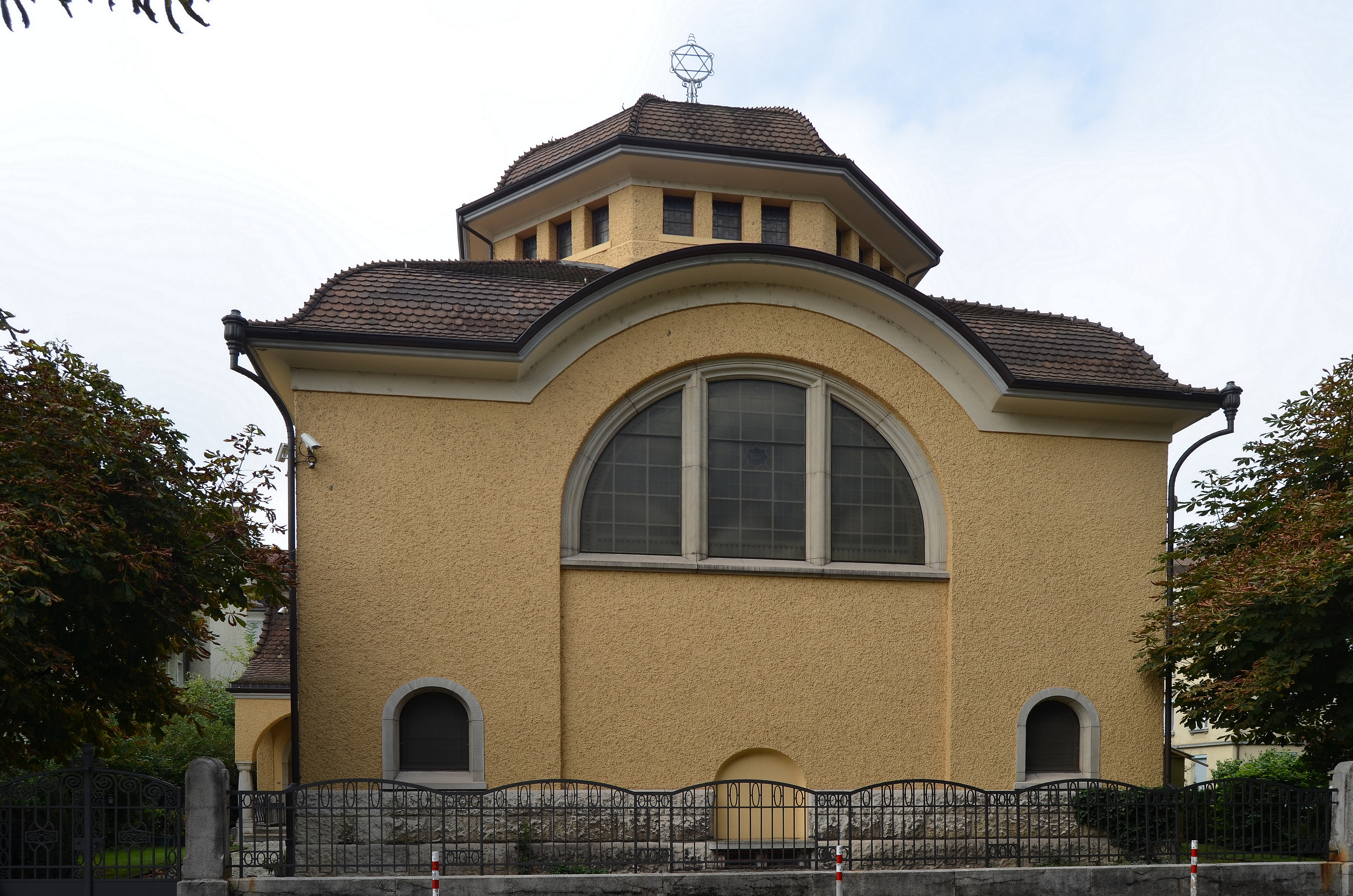
- The façade of the synagogue in 2012

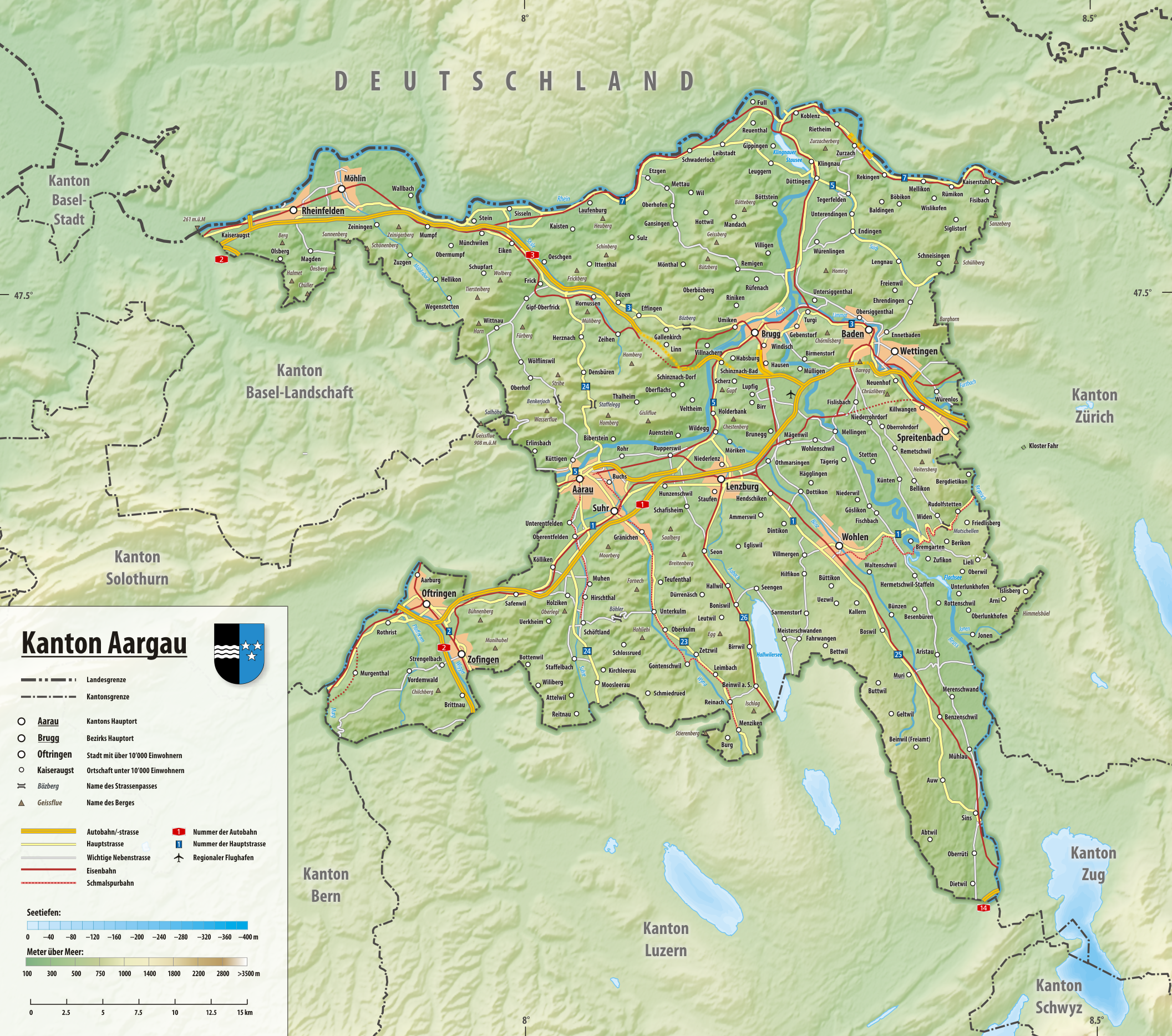
- Location of the synagogue in the Canton of Aargau

Religion
- Affiliation: Orthodox Judaism
- Rite: Nusach Ashkenaz
- Ecclesiastical or organizational status: Synagogue
- Ownership: Israelitische Kultusgemeinde Baden
- Status: Active

Location
- Location: Parkstrasse 17, Baden, Canton of Aargau
- Country: Switzerland
- Interactive map of Synagogue of Baden
- Coordinates: 47°28′43″N 08°18′32″E

Architecture
- Architects: Otto Dorer; Adolf Füchslin
- Type: Synagogue architecture
- Style: Art Nouveau
- Groundbreaking: 1912
- Completed: 1913

Swiss Cultural Property of National Significance
- Official name: Synagoge Parkstrasse 17
- Reference no.: 11609

The Synagogue of Baden (German: Synagoge Baden) is an Orthodox Jewish congregation and synagogue, located at Parkstrasse 17, in the city of Baden, in the Canton of Aargau, Switzerland. The synagogue was completed in 1913 and is listed among the Cultural Property of National Significance.

== History ==
The construction of a synagogue in Baden was projected in 1904. In December 1911, the Jewish community of Baden acquired a plot at Parkstrasse 17, in front of today's Grand Casino Baden, for 23,000 francs. Several architects offered to design the building. Eventually, the synagogue was designed in the Art Nouveau style by Badener architect Otto Dorer (1851–1920) and his collaborator Adolf Füchslin (1850–1925). It has large semi-circular windows and a richly adorned interior. The synagogue was consecrated on September 2, 1913.

In 1931, around Yom Kippur, the façade of the synagogue was sprayed with swastikas.

== See also ==
- History of the Jews in Switzerland
- List of cultural property of national significance in Switzerland: Aargau
- List of synagogues in Switzerland
