= Howard Meyerhoff =

American geologist

- Born: Howard Augustus Meyerhoff; May 27, 1899; New York City, New York
- Died: March 24, 1982 (aged 82); Tulsa, Oklahoma
- Education: University of Illinois; Columbia University
- Known for: Geology of Puerto Rico
- Children: Arthur A. Meyerhoff
- Scientific career
- Fields: Geology
- Institutions: Smith College; University of Pennsylvania
- Thesis: Geology of Puerto Rico (1935)

Howard Augustus Meyerhoff (May 27, 1899 – March 24, 1982) was an American geologist who taught geology at Smith College from 1925 to 1949. He served as administrative secretary of the American Association for the Advancement of Science (AAAS), as well as editor-in-chief of its journal, Science, from 1949 to 1953. He conducted research on the geology of Puerto Rico, which led to him publishing the book Geology of Porto Rico in 1933.

== Biography ==
Meyerhoff was born on May 27, 1899, in New York City, New York. He received his bachelor's degree from the University of Illinois in 1920, where he graduated Phi Beta Kappa. He received his master's degree and Ph.D. from Columbia University in 1922 and 1935, respectively. He was named professor of geology at Smith College in 1924, at the age of 25. He continued to teach geology at Smith until 1949, serving as chairman of the department for part of his time there. He was elected a fellow of the AAAS in 1931. During World War II, he served as director of civil defense for the Massachusetts Committee on Public Safety and as chief hearings officer of the War Labor Board.

Meyerhoff became administrative secretary of the AAAS from 1949 to 1953, during which time he was the editor-in-chief of both Science and Scientific Monthly. From 1953 to 1962, he was the director of the Scientific Manpower Commission, after which he became founding chairman of the geology department at the University of Pennsylvania. He was a founder of the Geological Society of America's Northeastern Section, which held its first meeting in February 1966. He was associate editor of the AAPG Bulletin from 1974 to 1977. He died on March 24, 1982, in Tulsa, Oklahoma.
