= City Church of Bremgarten =

Heritage building in Switzerland

Coordinates: 47°21′07″N 8°20′24″E

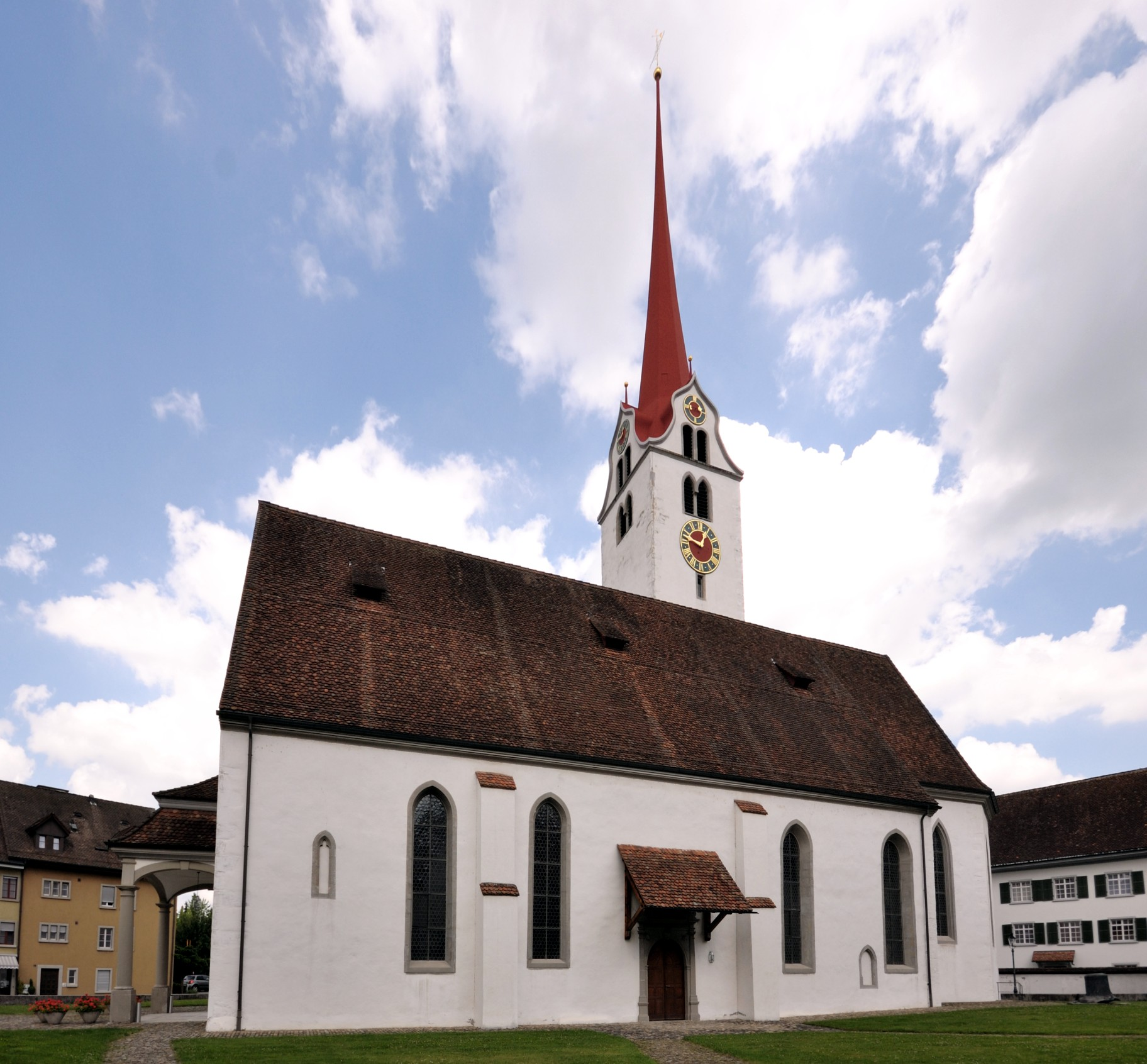
City Church of Bremgarten

The City Church of Bremgarten (German: Stadtkirche Bremgarten) is a listed heritage building in the city of Bremgarten, Canton of Aargau, Switzerland. It is an important landmark of Bremgarten. It is protected at the level of national importance (A-building), together with three chapels (St. Anna, St. Clara, and the Mother of God).

== History ==
The church was built in 1300 and was consecrated in honor of Saint Mary Magdalene. In 1420 Anna of Brunswick-Lüneburg, the wife of Frederick IV, Duke of Austria, gave all rights to the church to the local hospital, under the condition that a mass in her memory would be served once per year. The mass is still being served. In 1529, in the course of the Reformation, the building was converted into a Protestant church, but in 1532 it became Catholic again, Since 1532, the church has been consecrated in honor of Saint Nicholas.
