= Freudenau Castle =

Castle in Untersiggenthal, Switzerland

Ruins of Freudenau Castle
- Ruine Freudenau
- Untersiggenthal
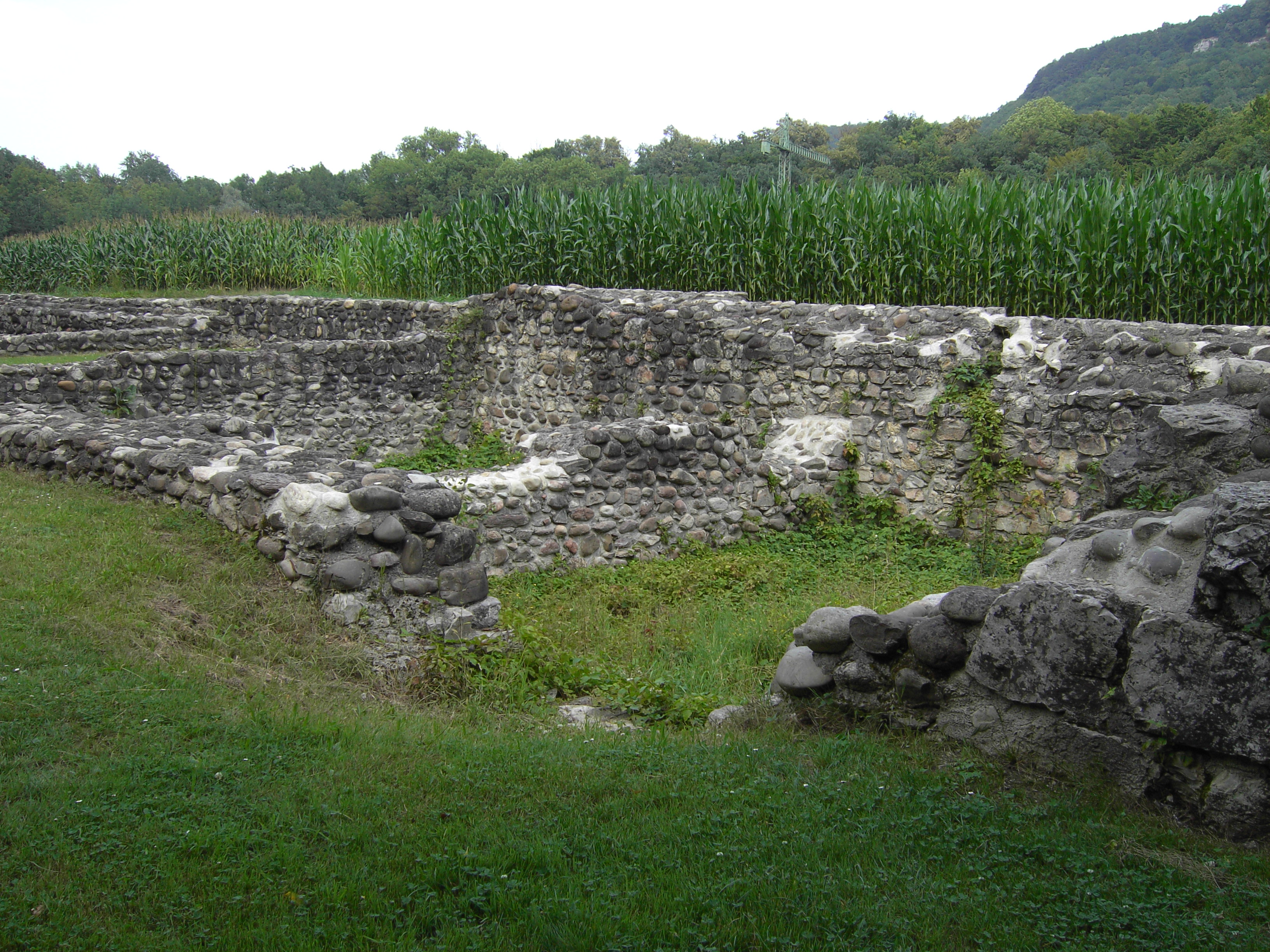
- Ruins of Freudenau

Site information
- Type: lowland castle
- Code: CH-AG
- Condition: ruin

Location
- Coordinates: 47°30′44.5″N 8°14′2.5″E

Site history
- Built: around 1240

Freudenau Castle is a ruined fort in the municipality of Untersiggenthal of the Canton of Aargau in Switzerland. It is a Swiss heritage site of national significance.

== See also ==
- List of castles in Switzerland
