= Arthur A. Meyerhoff =

American geologist (1928–1994)

Arthur Meyerhoff
- Born: Arthur Augustus Meyerhoff; September 9, 1928; Northampton, Massachusetts, US
- Died: September 18, 1994 (aged 66)
- Education: Yale University; Stanford University
- Known for: Criticism of plate tectonics
- Scientific career
- Fields: Geology
- Institutions: Standard Oil; American Association of Petroleum Geologists
- Thesis: A study of leaf venation in the Betulaceae, with its application to paleobotany (1952)
- Doctoral advisors: Konrad Bates Krauskopf; Richard H. Holm
- Other academic advisors: Preston Cloud

Arthur Augustus Meyerhoff (September 9, 1928 – September 18, 1994) was an American petroleum geologist known for his criticisms of plate tectonics. In 1971, he collaborated with Curt Teichert to write a critique of the theory of plate tectonics, arguing that it could not be true because it would have precluded both the formation of coal and widespread glaciation. His career included positions at Standard Oil, where he worked for ten years, and at the American Association of Petroleum Geologists, where he served as publications manager. He was the son of Howard Meyerhoff, who was also a geologist.
