= Altenburg Castle =

Castle in Brugg, Switzerland

- Schlössli; Schlösschen Altenburg
- Brugg
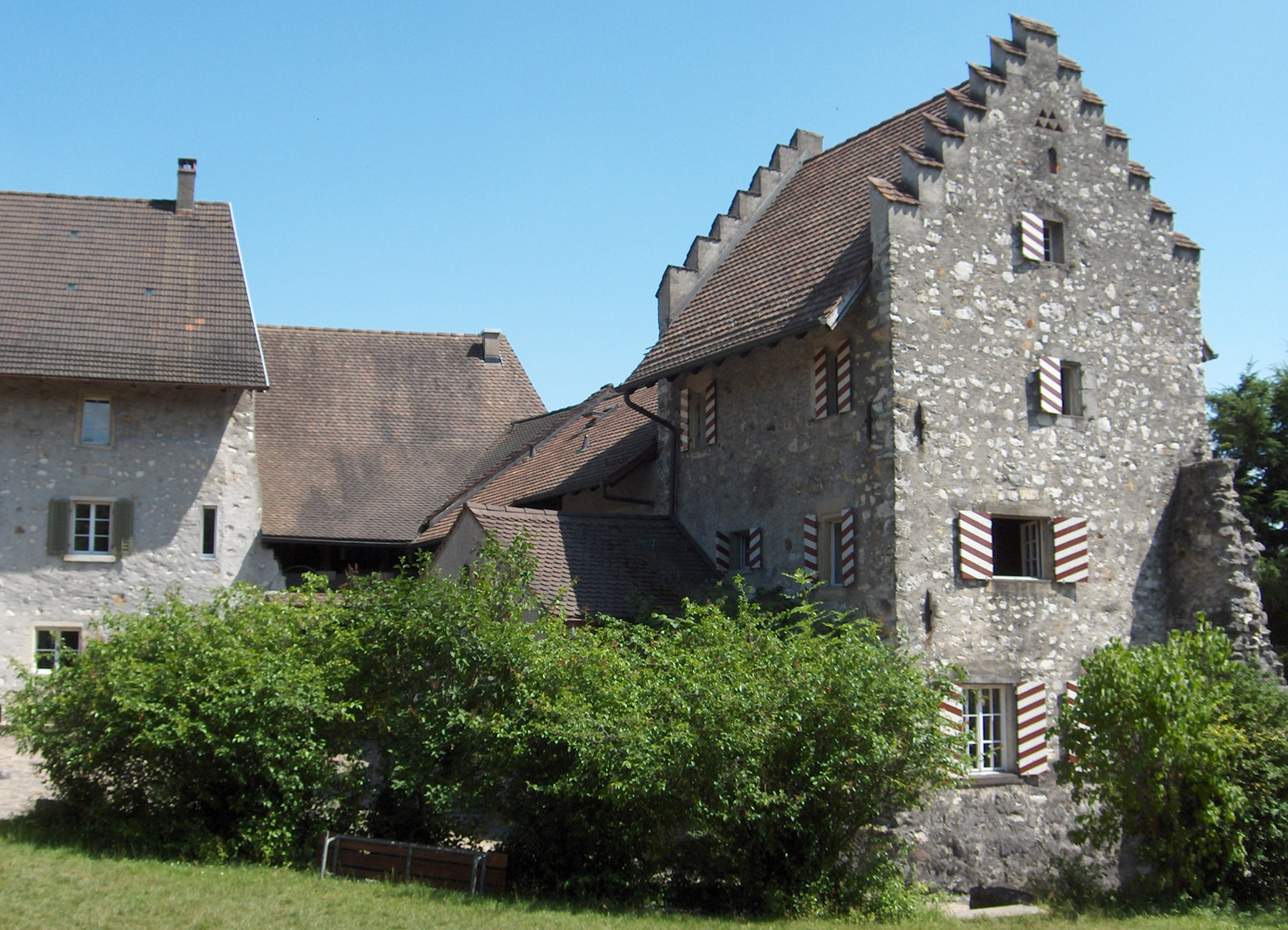
- Residence tower of Schlösschens Altenburg, with the Roman wall visible to the right

Site information
- Code: CH-AG
- Condition: Preserved, now a youth hostel

Location
- Coordinates: 47°28′55.24″N 8°11′39.62″E
- Height: 343 m above the sea

Site history
- Built: around 370

Altenburg Castle is a castle in the village of Altenburg bei Brugg in the municipality of Brugg in the canton of Aargau in Switzerland. The castle (the Schlössli) and the Altenburg Roman ruins, which are integrated into it, are classified as Swiss heritage site of national significance.

== History ==
=== Roman castle ===
The exact date of construction is unknown, however the traditional date given is during the reign of Valentinian I or around 370. The discovery of several small coin hoards near the ruins may indicate a construction date as early as the beginning of the 4th century AD.

The castle was built on a point above the Aar river as part of the Limes Germanicus to protect an easily fordable stretch of the river. The castle was bell-shaped with an interior courtyard that was about 28.3 meters (93 ft) long. The walls were 3–5 m (9.8–16.4 ft) thick and protected by six or eight half-round towers. The walls were additionally protected by two ditches. The height of the walls is unknown, but a 7.5 m (25 ft) tall section on south side is still visible, incorporated into the medieval Schlössli. The castle gate was on the eastern side of the castle and was flanked by two towers. Nothing is known about the number, location or purposes of the interior buildings.

=== Medieval castle ===
The Schlössli was built in the ruins of the Roman castle during the late 10th century, probably for an ancestor of the famous Habsburg family. It remained the seat of that family until the construction of Habsburg Castle in the 11th century. After that time it became the seat of Habsburg bailiffs or knights. In 1397 the castle, village and the rest of the Habsburg Eigenamt were gifted to Königsfelden Monastery in Windisch.

On 16 November 1414, Emperor Sigismund called the Council of Constance to settle the Western Schism between the three popes (Benedict XIII, Gregory XII, and John XXIII), all of whom claimed legitimacy. Frederick IV of Habsburg sided with John XXIII. When John XXIII was declared an antipope, he fled the city with Frederick's help. The emperor then declared the Habsburg lands forfeited and ordered the neighboring countries to conquer those lands for the emperor. The city-state of Bern had already pledged their support of the emperor against the Habsburgs in 1414, and so they were ready to invade. Following a series of Confederation victories, in 1415 much of the Eigenamt including Altenburg was in Bernese hands. After Bern assumed control, the monastery retained most of their rights to the land and castles.

In 1528 Bern adopted the new faith of the Protestant Reformation and quickly seized and secularized all of the lands of the religious houses. Under Bernese rule, the castle remained a minor manor house tucked away in the country. During the 16th century a late Gothic tower house topped with crow-stepped gables was added. In 1941 it was converted into a youth hostel, which it remains today.

== See also ==
- List of castles and fortresses in Switzerland
