= Harvey Meyerhoff =

American lawyer (1927–2023)

- Meyerhoff in 1993
- Born: April 6, 1927; Baltimore, Maryland, U.S.
- Died: August 6, 2023 (aged 96); Baltimore County, Maryland, U.S.
- Education: University of Wisconsin
- Occupations: businessman; lawyer; philanthropist
- Children: 4
- Father: Joseph Meyerhoff

Harvey Morton Meyerhoff (April 6, 1927 – August 6, 2023) was an American businessman, fundraiser, and philanthropist. He was a chairman of the trustees of Johns Hopkins Hospital and the founding chairman of the United States Holocaust Memorial Museum.

== Early life ==
Meyerhoff was born in a Jewish family on April 6, 1927, in Baltimore, Maryland. His father was building contractor Joseph Meyerhoff, who had immigrated to Baltimore from Russia in 1906; he is the namesake of the Baltimore Symphony Orchestra's building, Joseph Meyerhoff Symphony Hall. Meyerhoff graduated from Forest Park Senior High School in 1945, then earned his college degree from the University of Wisconsin in 1948.

== Career ==
Meyerhoff served in the U.S. Navy for three years during and after World War II. After returning home, he joined Monumental Properties, the family home building business. Meyerhoff later became president of Magna Properties.

=== U.S. Holocaust Memorial Museum ===
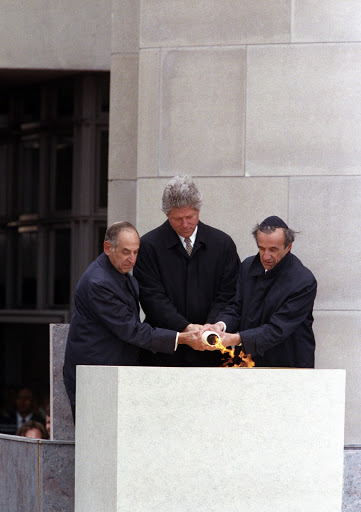
With President Bill Clinton, and Elie Wiesel at the dedication of the U.S. Holocaust Memorial Museum in 1993

On September 12, 1986, President Ronald Reagan appointed Meyerhoff to the United States Holocaust Memorial Council, charged with designing and building the United States Holocaust Memorial Museum. The next year, he was appointed the commission's chair, serving until 1993. The prior chairman was Elie Wiesel, but there were concerns as to whether he could raise the necessary funds, then design and supervise construction of the building. Meyerhoff successfully oversaw the museum's construction and raised the $150 million in private funds needed to build the museum on the National Mall in Washington, D.C. Meyerhoff personally donated $6 million of his own money.

The museum opened on-time and on-budget in 1993. The names of Meyerhoff, Wiesel, and President Bill Clinton are carved into the museum's cornerstone.

== Personal life ==
Meyerhoff married Lyn Pancoe in 1948. They had four children and ten grandchildren.

Meyerhoff owned a yacht named The Moose and collected glassware from Steuben Glass Works. He was also a minority owner of the Baltimore Orioles.

Meyerhoff died at his home in Baltimore County, Maryland, on August 6, 2023.

== Philanthropy ==
Meyerhoff helped to found the National Aquarium in Baltimore (the largest tourism attraction in the state of Maryland). He and his wife were benefactors of 70 Faces Media. In the 1980s, Meyerhoff was the vice chairman of Johns Hopkins Hospital and was a chairman emeritus of the Johns Hopkins Berman Institute of Bioethics. Meyerhoff also helped fund the Harvey M. and Lyn P. Meyerhoff Inflammatory Bowel Disease Center at Johns Hopkins Hospital. Meyerhoff served on the advisory board of the U.S. English Foundation, an organization that advocated for making English the official language of the United States.
