= Joseph Meyerhoff =

American lawyer (1899–1985)

- Born: April 8, 1899; Poltava, Russian Empire (now Ukraine)
- Died: February 2, 1985 (aged 85); Baltimore, Maryland, United States
- Occupations: Entrepreneur, investor, philanthropist
- Spouse: Rebecca Witten
- Children: Harvey Meyerhoff; Eleanor Meyerhoff Katz; Peggy Meyerhoff Pearlstone

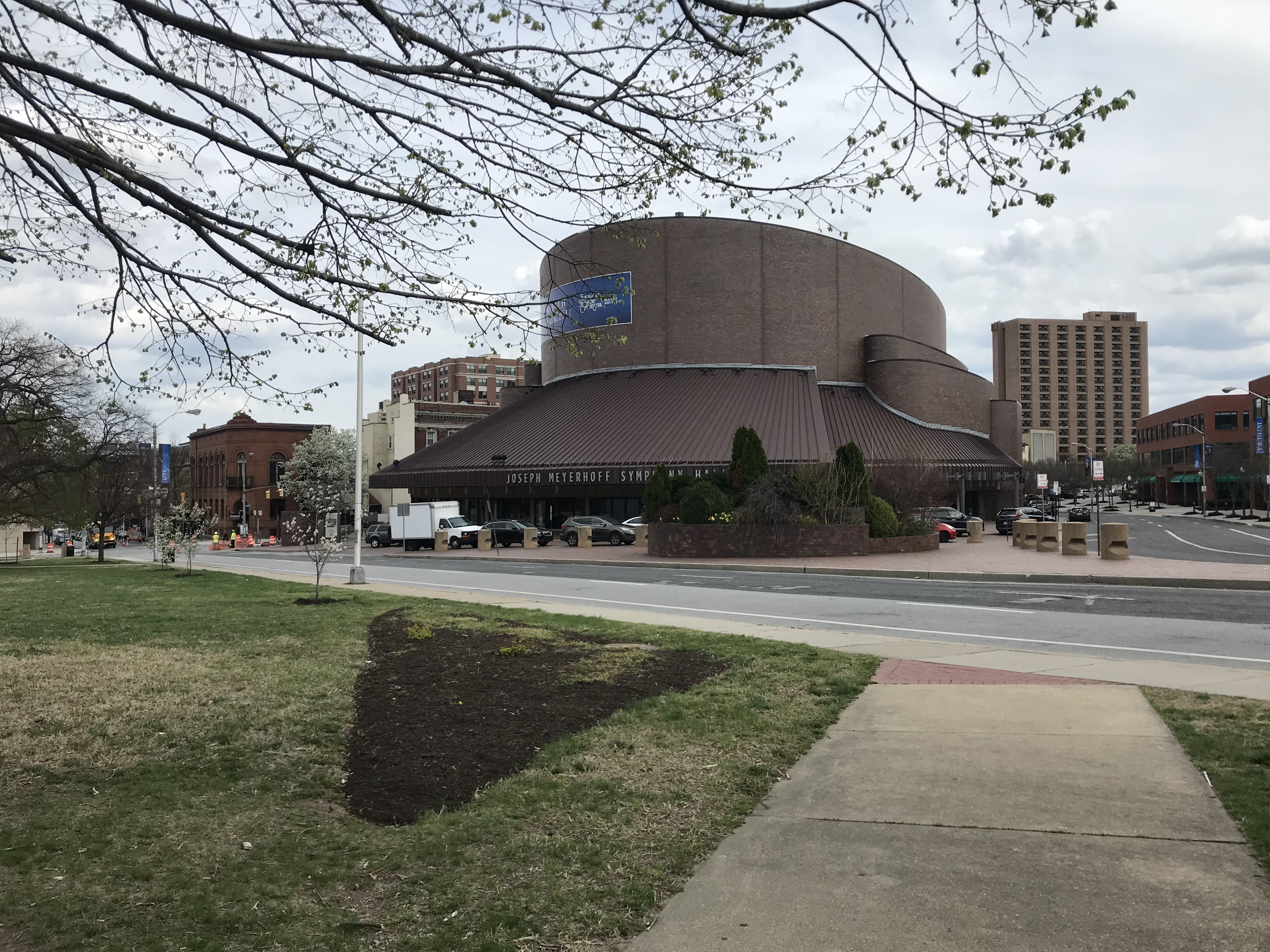

Joseph Meyerhoff (April 8, 1899 – February 2, 1985) was an American businessman, fundraiser, and philanthropist based in Baltimore, Maryland. His son was Harvey Meyerhoff.

== Biography ==
=== Professional career ===
Meyerhoff was born in Poltava in what is now Ukraine, then part of the Russian Empire, and was brought to the United States as a young boy in 1906. He grew up in Baltimore and graduated from Baltimore City College (which, despite its name, is a public high school); he then attended and completed his law degree at the University of Maryland in the mid-1930s. Meyerhoff practiced law for some years upon graduation from the UM School of Law until he opened a construction company with his brother called Monumental Properties Inc. This firm thrived for nearly 40 years until it was sold for about $180M (making Meyerhoff and his family one of the wealthiest in Baltimore). Monumental Properties was responsible for many buildings in Baltimore and Baltimore County, Maryland, including various housing developments and shopping centers throughout the west side. During the 1940s, Meyerhoff refused to rent or sell to fellow Jews in the affluent and predominantly white Christian neighborhood of Roland Park in Baltimore. In 1948, the Baltimore Jewish Council wrote Meyerhoff a formal letter denouncing his complicity in antisemitic real estate practices and requested that he show solidarity with the Jewish community, but Meyerhoff insisted that his career would be ruined if he sold or rented to Jews in non-Jewish neighborhoods. In the early 1950s, Meyerhoff and other prominent Jewish-American businessmen were chosen to assist Israel during its initial establishment crises. He retired in 1965.

=== Philanthropy ===
Meyerhoff continued his career as an avid philanthropist serving as president of the Baltimore Symphony Orchestra in the 1970s, where he personally contributed money and helped raise millions of dollars. He is credited, along with music director Sergiu Comissiona, with re-organizing and revitalizing the group. The BSO's primary home, the Joseph Meyerhoff Symphony Hall, is named after him. Meyerhoff also supported many other Jewish charities and art museums throughout Baltimore and was eventually inducted into the Baltimore Business Hall of Fame along with Robert Merrick.

== Personal life ==
Meyerhoff was married in the 1930s to Rebecca Witten and they had three children whom they raised in Baltimore:

- Harvey Meyerhoff was married to Lenore Pancoe who died in 1988. He remarried columnist Lois Wyse in 1990.
- Eleanor Meyerhoff Katz, real estate business executive and attorney who also served as vice chairman for the United Jewish Appeal and board member of the United States Holocaust Memorial Council. She was married to Herb Katz, the first president of the Jewish Federation of Broward County.
- Peggy Meyerhoff Pearlstone was married to Jack Pearlstone. Their son, Richard L. Pearlstone, served as national chairman of the United Jewish Appeal.
