= Wildegg Castle =

Schloss Wildegg
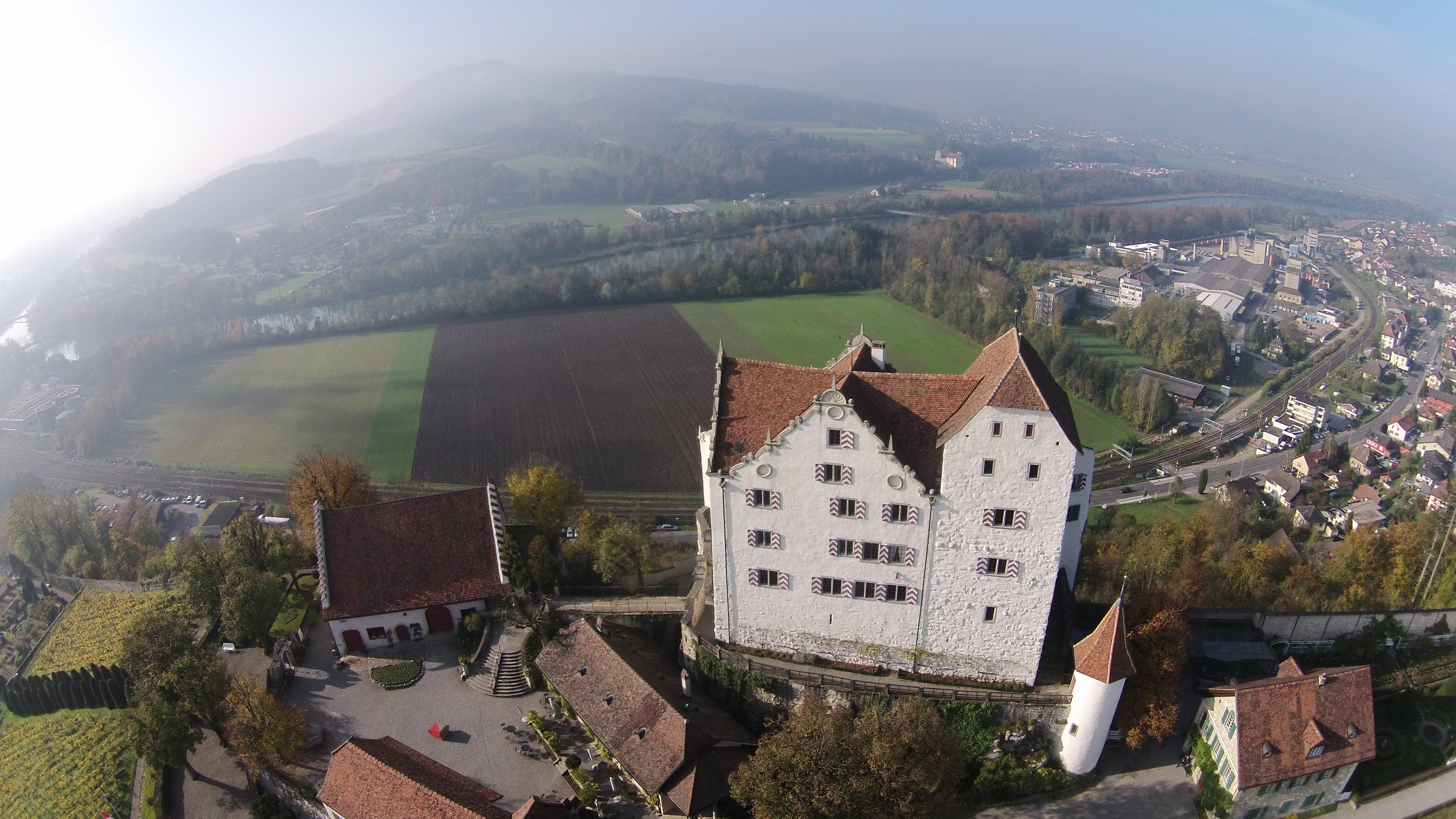
- Castle of Wildegg, view from above

- Location in Aargau Location in Switzerland
- Interactive map of the Schloss Wildegg area

General information
- Location: Möriken-Wildegg, Aargau, Switzerland
- Coordinates: 47°25′13.87″N 8°10′13.51″E
- Construction started: 1242

Wildegg Castle is a small castle in the municipality of Möriken-Wildegg in the canton of Aargau in Switzerland.

== See also ==
- List of castles and fortresses in Switzerland

== Literature ==
- Hans Lehmann: Die Burg Wildegg und ihre Bewohner, Aarau 1922.
- Andres Furger und andere: Schloss Wildegg. Aussenstelle des Schweizerischen Landesmuseums, Braunschweig 1994 (Digitalisat).
- Sophie von Erlach: Kleine Burg-Chronik des Schlosses Wildegg der Sophie von Erlach, hrsg. und komm. von Andres Furger, Zürich 1994.
- Walter Merz (Hrsg.): Die Urkunden des Schlossarchivs Wildegg, Aarau 1931.
- Thomas Pauli, Stefan Hess: Schloss Wildegg: Neu unter Aargauer Flagge, in: Argovia 2011, S. 264–269.
- Dokumentation der Sanierung Domäne Schloss Wildegg 1999–2011, hrsg. vom Bundesamt für Bauten und Logistik BBL, Bern 2011 ISBN 978-3-905-782-14-1
- Christoph Reding, Felix Ackermann, Felix Müller: Schloss Wildegg. (Schweizerische Kunstführer, Nr. 926, Serie 93). Hrsg. Gesellschaft für Schweizerische Kunstgeschichte GSK. Bern 2013, ISBN 978-3-03797-099-7.
