= Stein Castle, Aargau =

Castle ruin in Baden, Aargau, Switzerland

Stein Castle
- Festung Stein
- Baden
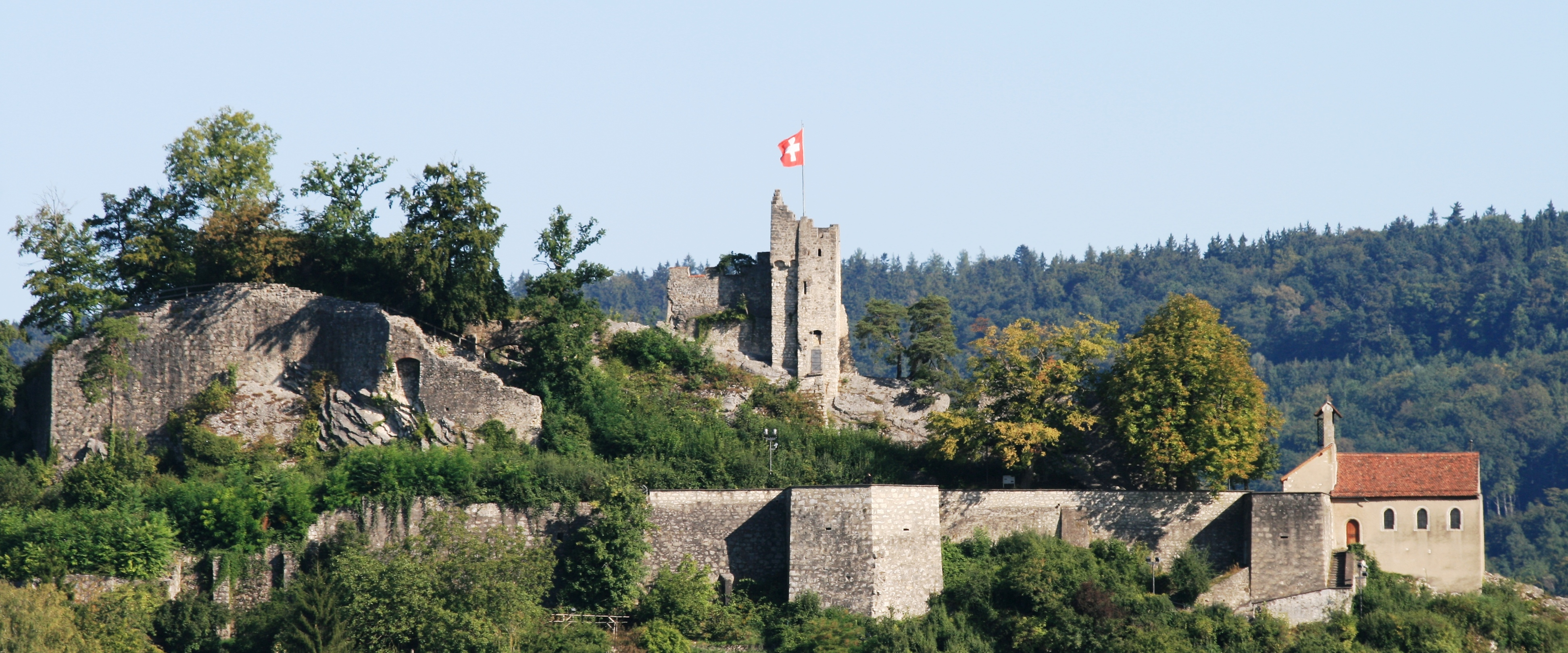

Site information
- Type: hill castle
- Code: CH-AG
- Condition: Ruins (destroyed 1712)

Location
- Coordinates: 47°28′23.38″N 8°18′19.62″E
- Height: 445 m above the sea

Site history
- Built: Before 1000, 1658–1670

Stein Castle (German: Schloss Stein or Ruine Stein) is a castle ruin above the municipality of Baden in the canton of Aargau in Switzerland. It is a Swiss heritage site of national significance.

== History ==
The castle was built on a rocky promontory above Baden gorge some time before 1000 A.D. In the late 11th century the castle came to the Lenzburg family. By the early 12th century, the cadet line that lived in the castle called themselves the Counts of Baden. In 1172, the castle was inherited by the Kyburg family. When that family died out in 1263, the castle was inherited by the Habsburgs in 1264. The castle was occupied by a bailiff and was the seat of the Austrian administration for Vorderösterreich (Further Austria) and housed the archive. The castle was besieged and destroyed in 1415 by the Swiss Confederation. It was rebuilt in 1658-70 but was demolished in 1712. It has remained in ruins since.
