= Meierhof =

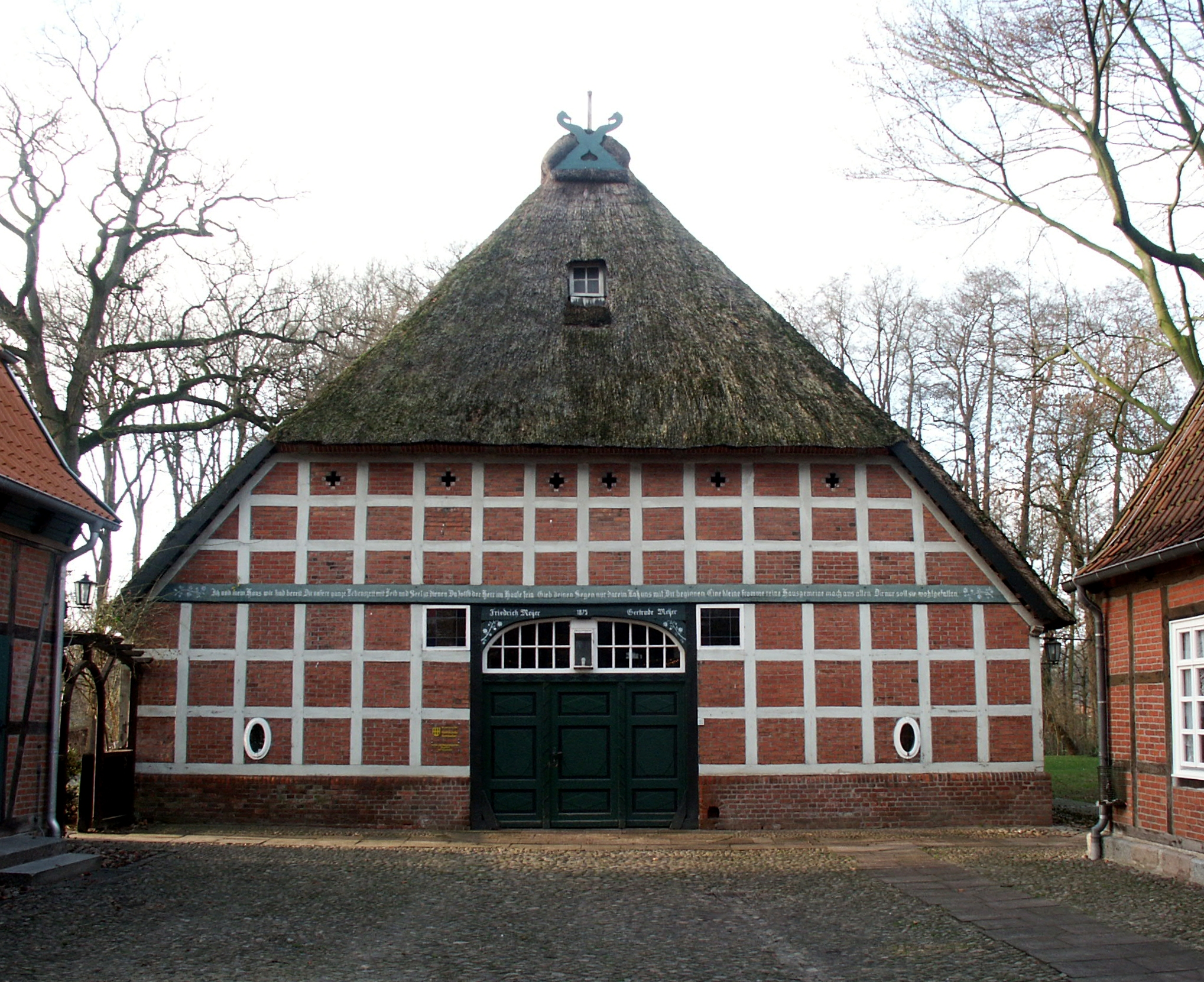
Meierhof in Scheeßel

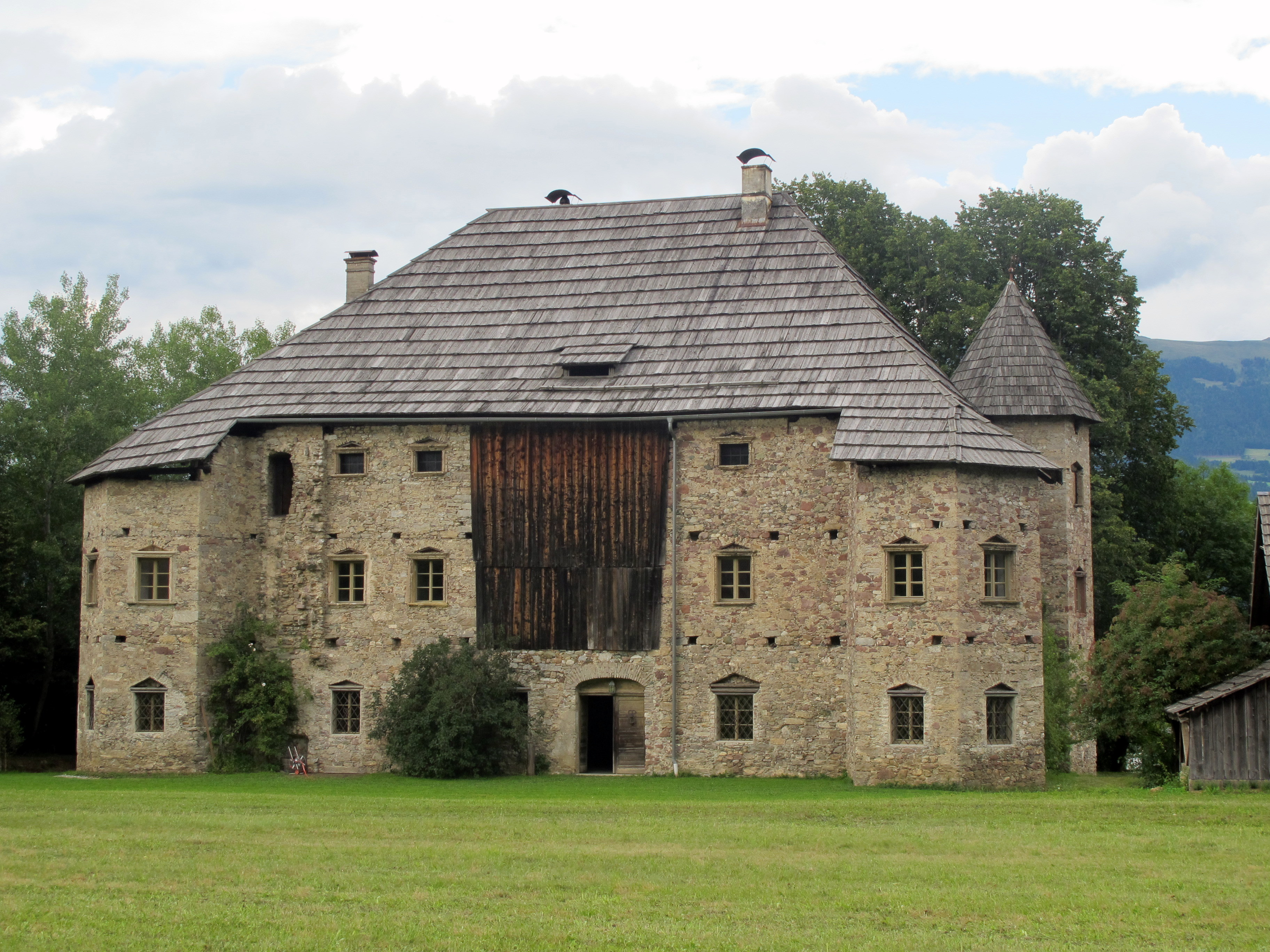
Pöllan Castle, a Meyerhof in Austria

A Meierhof or Meyerhof (from Latin: maiores villae) was a farm or building which was occupied or had been occupied by the administrator (the Meier) of a noble or ecclesiastical estate.

The similar Sedelhof was a tax-exempt farm building owned by a noble that was unfortified.
