= Johann Georg Ritter von Zimmermann =

Swiss philosophical writer, naturalist, and physician (1728–1795)

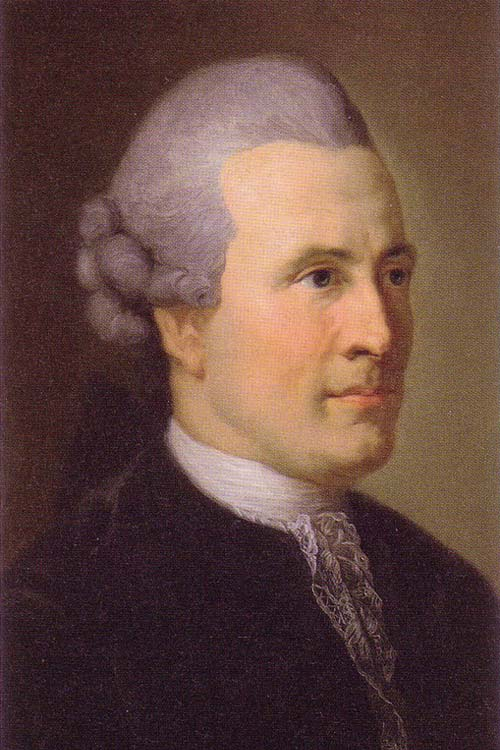
- Born: Johann Georg Zimmerman; 8 December 1728; Brugg, Aargau
- Died: 7 October 1795 (aged 66); Hanover
- Children: Katharina von Zimmermann

Johann Georg Ritter von Zimmermann / Johann Georg Zimmermann (8 December 1728, in Brugg, Aargau – 7 October 1795, in Hanover) was a Swiss philosophes, writer, naturalist, and physician, who had studied under Albrecht von Haller. He was the private physician of George III and later Frederick the Great.

== Life and works ==
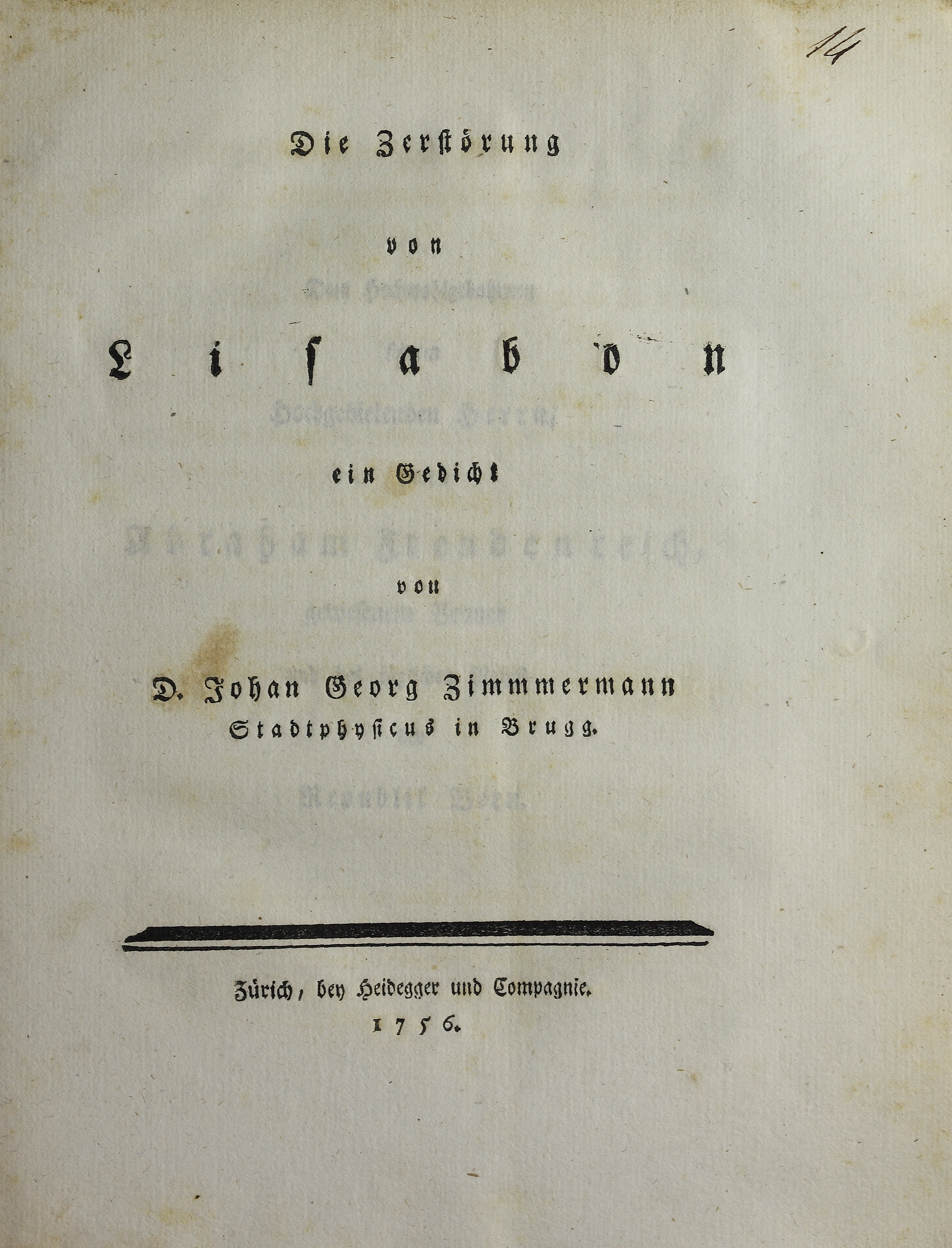
Die Zerstörung von Lisabon (1756)

He studied at Göttingen, where he took the degree of a doctor of medicine, and established his reputation by the dissertation, De irritabilitate (1751). After traveling in the Netherlands and France, he practised as a city physician (Stadtphysicus) in Brugg, and wrote Über die Einsamkeit ("Of solitude", 1756, 1784–1785) and Vom Nationalstolz ("Of national pride", 1758). These books made a great impression in Germany, and were translated into almost every European language.

In Zimmermann's character there was a strange combination of sentimentalism, melancholy and enthusiasm; and it was by the free and eccentric expression of these qualities that he excited the interest of his contemporaries. Another of his books, written at Brugg, Von der Erfahrung in der Arzneiwissenschaft ("Of experience in pharmacology", 1764), also attracted much attention. In 1768 he settled at Hanover as a private physician of George III with the title of a Hofrat. Catherine II invited him to the court of St Petersburg, but this invitation he declined.

He attended Frederick the Great during that monarch's last illness, and afterwards issued various books about him, of which the chief were Über Friederich den Grossen und meine Unterredung mit ihm kurz vor seinem Tode ("On Frederick the Great and my conversation with him shortly before his death", 1788) and Fragmente über Friedrich den Grossen ("Fragments on Frederick the Great", 1790). According to the Encyclopædia Britannica Eleventh Edition, "[t]hese writings display extraordinary personal vanity, and convey a wholly false impression of Frederick's character."

He had a daughter named Katharina von Zimmermann who died in her 20s from tuberculosis, which also killed her mother and grandmother.

== Works ==
- J.G. Zimmerman: Solitude or The effect of occasional Retirement (2 Vol., 1800, (1st.ed.) and 1802 (3rd.ed.) Vernon and Hood etc. London, XLVII, 310pp.,(20),354pp.) With Portrait of Zimmerman and etchings by Ridley and biographical sketch
- Solitude; In Two Parts (1840)
