= Katharina von Zimmermann =

German woman, friend of Johann Wolfgang von Goethe

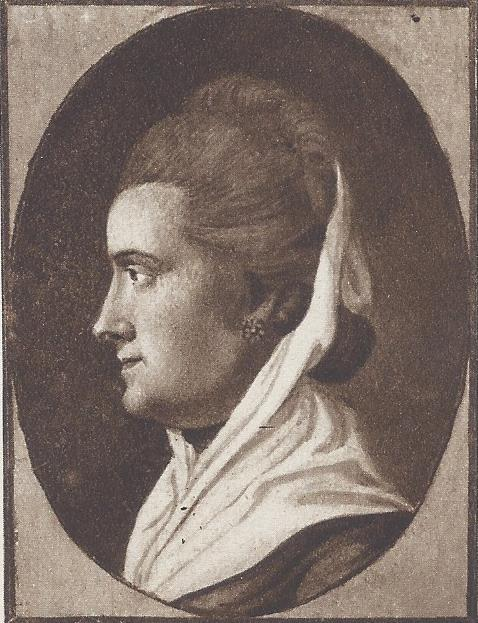
- Born: 1756; Brugg, Germany
- Died: September 10, 1781 (aged 24–25); Hanover, Germany
- Occupation: Friend of Goethe (who wrote about her)
- Parent: Johann Georg Ritter von Zimmermann

Katharina von Zimmermann (1756 – 10 September 1781) was a medical doctor's daughter, originally from central Switzerland, who died young. She is known to posterity chiefly on account of her friendship with Goethe, who wrote about her.

== Life ==
Katharina Zimmermann was born in Brugg, a small but politically significant town in the Aare Valley, then enjoying the status of a Municipality ("Munizipalstadt"), governed directly under the control of Bern in Switzerland. She was the second recorded child of Johann Georg von Zimmermann, a physician and writer. Her mother and grandmother both died of Tuberculosis in March 1771, while Katharina was still a young teenager. She was relocated to Hanover where she lived with a friend of her father's called Mrs von Döring. Shortly after this she was moved again, to live with friends of her father in Minden. In May 1773 her father, who in the interim had closed down his own household, sent her on to Lausanne, accompanied by a request to father's friend and colleague, Samuel-Auguste Tissot, that he do everything necessary to provide her with a complete upbringing (einer "vollkommenen Education"), even if the cost should exceed the budgeted annual amount of 400 Thalers. Moving to Lausanne instantly provided Katharina with four new sisters. Along with the Tissot sisters, the household already included a girl from Poland.

In March 1775 Zimmermann removed his daughter to Bern where she moved in with the Haller family. There is speculation that she had acquired a boyfriend in Lausanne of whom he disapproved. Two months later, in May 1775, he decided to reclaim his daughter. Together they traveled to Hanover, arriving on 5 October 1771. Along the way, between 22 and 27 September, Zimmermann and his daughter stayed as guest of the Goethe family in Frankfurt. Johann Wolfgang von Goethe was 26 at this time: his engagement to Lili Schönemann was about to be broken off by Lili Schönemann's mother, ostensibly due to the differing religious backgrounds of the parties. He wrote to his friend Johann Caspar Lavater on 28 September 1775 that, "his daughter is not closed off, but only holding back, and she has left the door slightly ajar..." ("Seine Tochter ist so in sich, nicht verriegelt nur zurückgetreten ist sie, und hat die Thüre leis angelehnt"). Zimmermann had taken himself off to the Wetterau countryside for a couple of days on 27 September, leaving his daughter behind with Goethe's mother's house, and Goethe found the opportunity to study Katharina more closely, and recording what he saw: "Thin and fully formed, she steps out with confidence: her regularly structured facial features would be attractive if she would only take a little trouble to do something with it." ("Schlank und wohlgewachsen, trat sie auf ohne Zierlichkeit, ihr regelmäßiges Gesicht wäre angenehm gewesen, wenn sich ein Zug von Teilnahme darin aufgetan hätte")

For Goethe 1775 was important for another reason. In November he left the family home in Frankfurt, relocating to Weimar in order to take a post with Karl August of Saxe-Weimar. Much later Goethe wrote about Katharina's visit in the autobiographical work covering his early years, "Dichtung und Wahrheit". He wrote that Katharina had confided to his mother ("Frau Aja") that she had no wish to trail around after her father any more. She would rather live as a slave or a maid in the Goethe household than be exposed to her father's harsh tyranny. "Frau Aja" had discussed the matter with Goethe, suggesting he might marry Katharina. A marriage with a noble purpose was a not uncommon thing among the Frankfurt bourgeois families, but Goethe lashed out: "If we were discussing an orphan ... it would be worth considering and pursuing, but God preserve me from a father-in-law like that!" Goethe's biographer, Karl Goedeke, cast serious doubt on Goethe's version of events, bearing in mind Zimmermann's attitude to his "adored daughter" ("zärtlich geliebten Tochter"). Goedeke contends that the marriage idea from Frau Goethe was a non-starter because Katharina was still in love with a man she had met when living in Lausanne, and that her thwarted lover committed suicide the next year.

Katharina continued to Hanover with her father. Here, in December 1775, she rejected a marriage proposal to a "well placed" young man, even though his proposal was supported by her father. She thought him a "petit-maître" ("poser"). By 1780 she had returned to live with her father's Hanover friend, Mrs von Döring. Here, on 31 December 1780, she suffered a serious bleeding which was a symptom of the Tuberculosis that had already killed her mother and grandmother. Katharina von Zimmermann died on 10 September 1780 in the presence of her father. Johann Georg Zimmermann also attended his daughter's autopsy, and by sufficiently observing the marks on her lungs, satisfied himself as to the cause of her death.

== The original Mignon? ==
Writing in 1900, Alfons Matthes believed that he had discovered in Katharine von Zimmermann the inspiration for Mignon, a character in Goethe's second novel, Wilhelm Meister's Apprenticeship. Not everyone was convinced.
