= Suhre =

Tributary of the river Aare

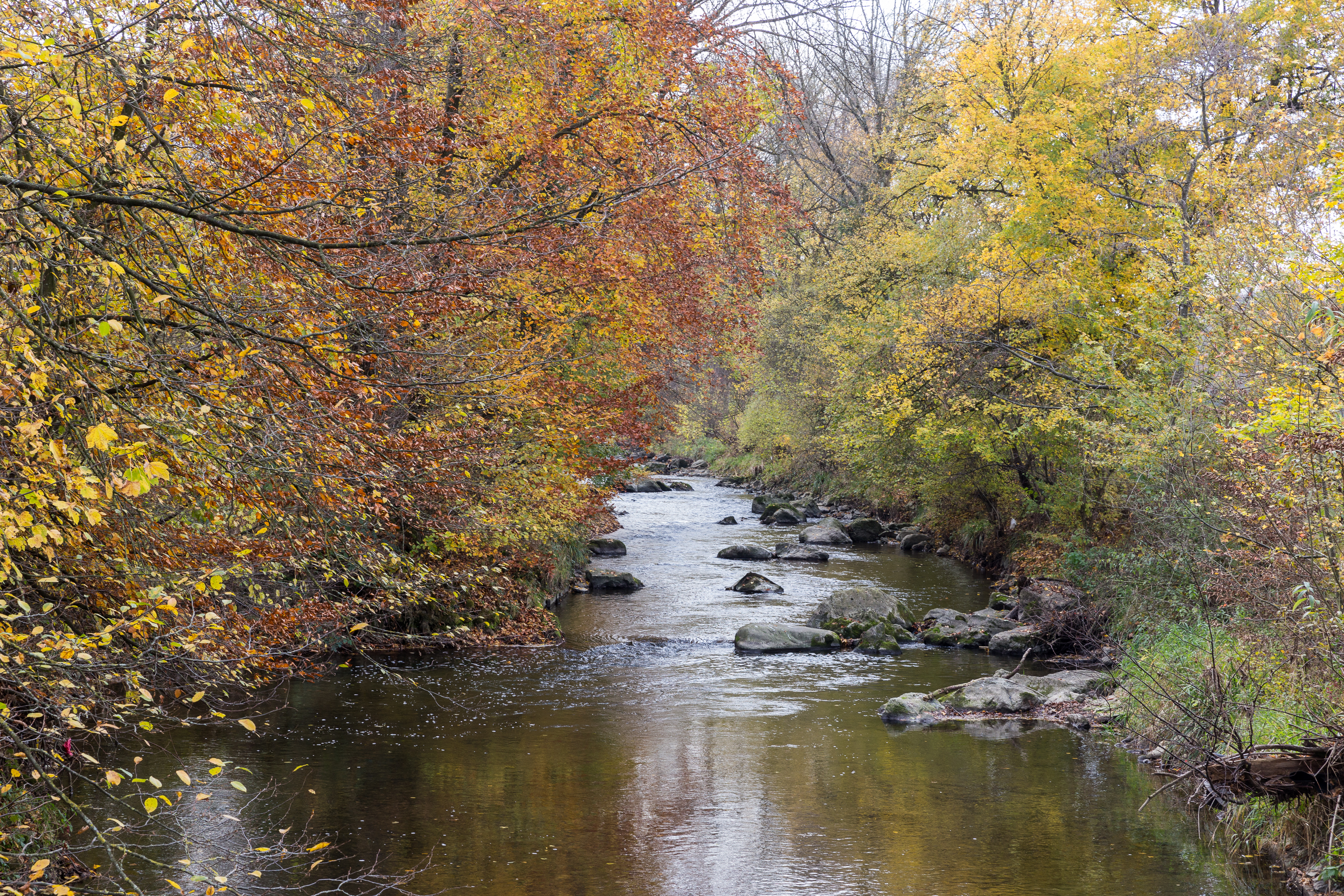
- Suhre between Suhr and Oberentfelden

Location
- Country: Switzerland

Physical characteristics
- Source: Sempachersee
  - coordinates: 47°09′45″N 8°07′19″E
- Mouth: Aare
  - coordinates: 47.4057°N 8.0660°E

Basin features
- Progression: Aare→ Rhine→ North Sea

The river Suhre is a 34 kilometer long tributary of the river Aare in the Swiss cantons of Lucerne and Aargau. The river rises in Sempachersee (or Lake Sempach) at an elevation of 504 meters above sea level, and joins the Aare east of the town Aarau at an elevation of 362 meters. The most important side valley is the Ruedertal, which joins the Suhretal (or Suhre Valley) at Schöftland.

In the medieval age, the river had several names: Suron (1036), Suranum flumen (1210), Sure (1241). Today, the name is written without "h" in the canton of Lucerne, and with "h" in the canton of Aargau. The most important tributaries are the Ruederchen joining at Schöftland, the Ürke joining at Unterentfelden and the Wyna joining at Suhr.

== River and valley ==
The Suhre flows from the Sempachersee in Oberkirch (LU) north of the lake just next to medieval town of Sursee, which it traverses afterwards. After the underpass of the A2 motorway the creek Ron from the Mauesee joins the Suhre in the Sursiwald from the west (forest; left, Sursee). Chommlibach joins the Suhre right afterwards (right, Sursee). Then it runs further north between the villages Knutwil and Büron in the distance. Then it continues west of Triengen and east of the village Winikon in the middle of the valley and the last one in canton of Lucerne passing in the distance of the now Aargovian villages (Winikon, Reitnau, Attelwil, Moosleerau, Kirchleerau) situated at the bottom of the enclosing hills (about 650 m to 850 m a.s.l.) on each side of the flat, about 2 km wide valley. Just before Staffelbach, the Suhre traverses at 471 m the end moraine (up to 519 m a.s.l.) of the glacier that formed the upper Suhre Valley and flows then through Staffelbach.

Still running north it passes Wittwil in the east before entering Schöftland, where in the middle of this larger village the Ruederchen joins from the east (right, Schöftland). Ruederchen is a larger creek which forms the Ruedertal, which in itself divides from north-west to south-east the north–south mountain range between the Suhretal and the Wynetal in the east.

After Schöftland the Suhre runs west of Hirschthal ad further away from Holziken in the east. Holziken is at the northern bottom end of the eastern mountain range of the upper two-thirds of Suhre Valley. East of Holziken the Ürketal with its Ürke joins the Suhretal and makes the valley again more than 2 km wide. But only 500 metres further north the valley gets even wider (almost 3 km), since the valley of the Mülibach joins now the Suhretal from the west, as well as nowadays the most frequented motorway in Switzerland, the A1. While the Mülibach becomes the Köllikerbach after traversing Kölliken in the west end of the valley, the Ürke passes Kölliken on its east side, both running further north and joining each other before Oberentfelden. The Suhre passes Ober-, Mittel-, and Untermuhen on their west sides, but now on the east side of the valley.

The Suhre, after it underpasses the A1, it traverses Oberentfelden right in the middle of this larger village and also now in the middle of the valley, to be joined by the Ürke in Unterentfelden (406 m a.s.l.) just after Oberentfelden and runs now almost westwards to circumvent the Gönert hill (468 m a.s.l.). About after 2 km it runs through the middle of Suhr, turns again to the north, being joined by the Wyna from the right just before Buchs (AG). After underpassing one of the major Swiss railway lines (running between Bern/Basel/Olten and Zurich), the Suhr passes Aarau on its eastern end and joins the much larger Aare running east-north-east at 362 metres above sea level.

== See also ==
- List of rivers of Switzerland
