= Gränichen =

- Municipality
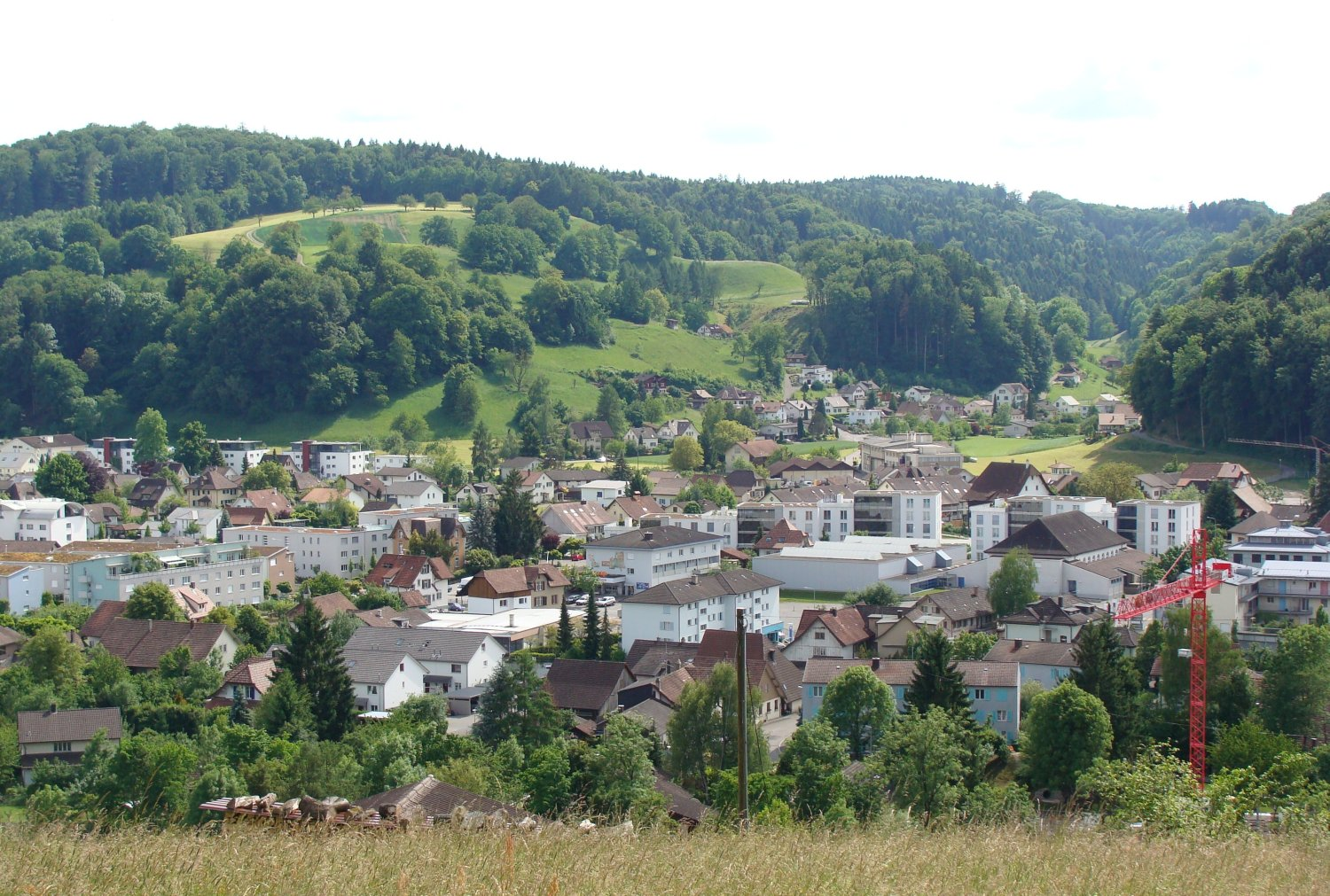

- Flag Coat of arms
- Location of Gränichen
- Location within Switzerland Location within Canton of Aargau
- Coordinates: 47°21′N 8°06′E
- Country: Switzerland
- Canton: Aargau
- District: Aarau

Government
  - Mayor: Rolf Arber

Area
  - Total: 17.21 km^{2} (6.64 sq mi)
- Elevation: 410 m (1,350 ft)
- Highest elevation (Pfendel): 615 m (2,018 ft)
- Lowest elevation (Wyna): 402 m (1,319 ft)

Population (December 2020)
  - Total: 8,147
  - Density: 473.4/km^{2} (1,226/sq mi)
- Time zone: UTC+01:00 (CET)
  - Summer (DST): UTC+02:00 (CEST)
- Postal code: 5722
- SFOS number: 4006
- ISO 3166 code: CH-AG
- Localities: Gränichen, Rütihof, Bleien, Refental
- Surrounded by: Hunzenschwil, Muhen, Oberentfelden, Schafisheim, Seon, Suhr, Teufenthal, Unterkulm
- Website: www.graenichen.ch

Gränichen is a municipality in the district of Aarau of the canton of Aargau in Switzerland.

Aerial view (1967)

== Geography ==
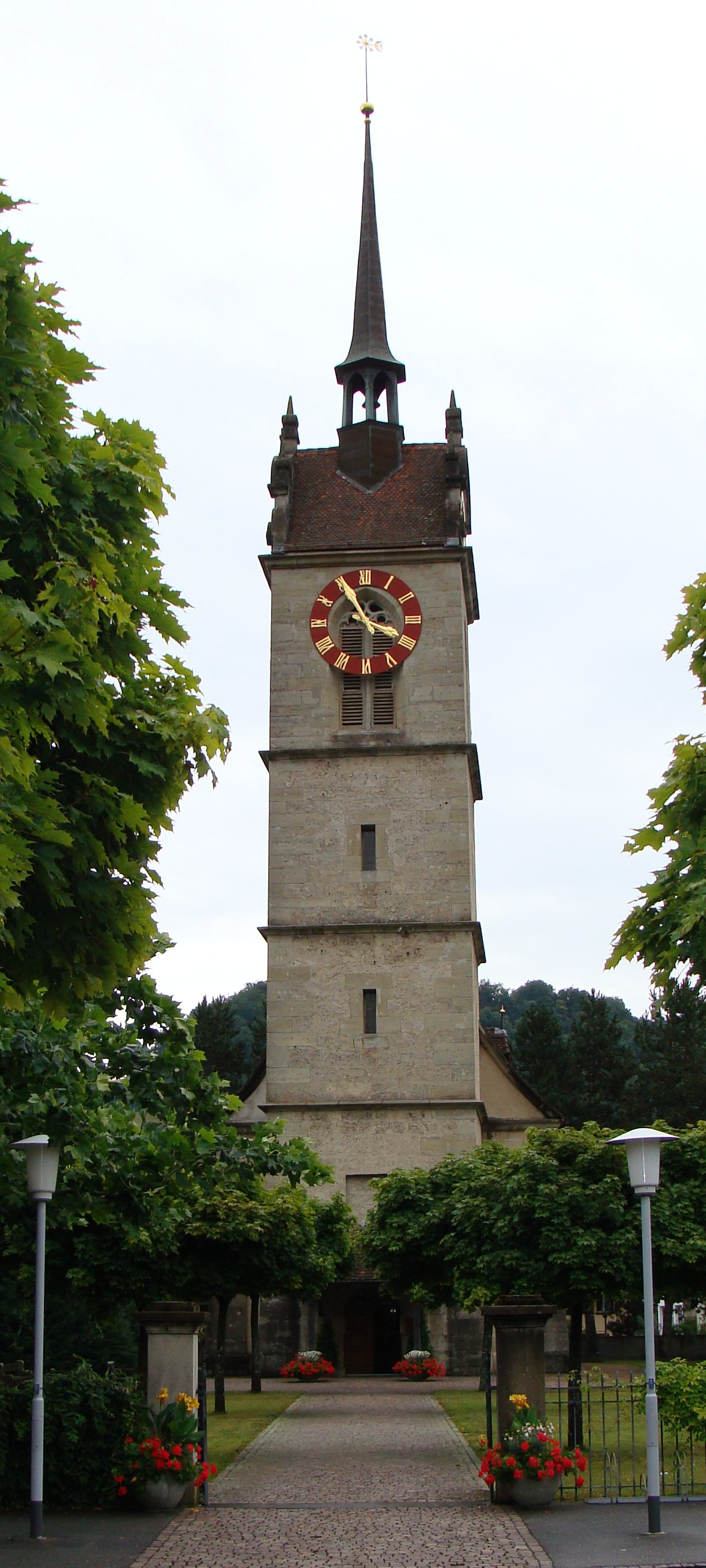
The Church

The river Wyna flows north at first and heads northwest thereafter. The valley has an average width of about 500 m (1,600 ft). On both sides of the valley there are steep hills with tributary valleys and small high plateaus. The landscape is not dissimilar to that of the Tafeljura, even though - geographically and geologically speaking - Gränichen lies in the Midland of Switzerland.

The hills on the left side of the valley are (from north to south): Manzenberg ( 524 m (1,719 ft) ), Wällenen (524 m (1,719 ft)559 m), Moosberg (524 m (1,719 ft)550 m), Heidberg (566 m (1,857 ft)) and Pfendel (615 m (2,018 ft)). These are foothills of the Schornig (596 m (1,955 ft)), which marks the transition to the valley of the river Suhre. The hills on the right side of the valley are called Fuden (570 m (1,870 ft)), Räckholderen (566 m (1,857 ft)), Breitenberg (551 m (1,808 ft)) and Surberg (607 m (1,991 ft)). In front of the Breitenberg is the Schulthess (513 m (1,683 ft)) which has almost the shape of an ellipsis. The Dossen (532 m (1,745 ft)) und the high plateau of the Liebegg are foothills of the Surberg.

Near the southern border, at an average distance of two kilometers, there are three hamlets, which also belong to the municipality of Gränichen: Rütihof (585 m (1,919 ft)) on Moorbergs, Bleien (430 m (1,410 ft)) and Refental (490 m (1,610 ft)) between Breitenberg, Dossen and Surberg.

Gränichen has an area, as of 2006, of 17.3 km^{2} (6.7 sq mi). Of this area, 30.1% is used for agricultural purposes, while 56.7% is forested. Of the rest of the land, 13.1% is settled (buildings or roads) and the remainder (0.1%) is non-productive (rivers or lakes). The highest point is at 615 m (2,018 ft) above main sea level on the 'Pfendel', the lowest point is at 402 m (1,319 ft) where the river wyna leaves the village.

The seven neighbouring villages are Suhr in the nordwest, Hunzenschwil in the north, Schafisheim in the northeast, Seon in the east, Teufenthal in the south, Unterkulm in the south, Muhen in the southwest and Hirschthal in the west.

== History ==
History's first mention of Gränichen was around 1184 under the name of Cranechon. However, archaeological discoveries dating from the Neolithic, as well as the remains of a Celtic castle, show that the area around Gränichen has been settled for quite some time.

In the 12th century Gränichen belonged to the monastery of Engelberg and later came under the reign of the Habsburgs, who passed the government of the village to the Lords of the Castle of Liebegg. After 1415, Gränichen belonged to Bern.

The construction of the Wynentalbahn railway in 1904 promoted the settlement of local industries.

== Coat of arms ==
The blazon of the municipal coat of arms is Per bend sinister Or and Azure a Bend counterchanged.

== Points of interest ==
The castle of Liebegg resides on a hill close to the border to Teufenthal, about three kilometers south-south-east of the village center. The Castle, which dates from the 11th century, is nowadays used as a center for culture, meetings and congresses.

Near the village center one finds the "Chornhaus", which, built in 1695, looks very similar to a small castle, because of its tower. Until 1798 it served as a granary and was thereafter used by the municipal administration department for over a century. Since the new parish hall was completed in 1995 it contains a small village museum.

The Reformed Church was built from 1661 to 1663 on the site where the previous church had collapsed. It is one of the main works of Protestant church building in the canton of Aargau, and is listed as a heritage site of national significance.

The other heritage site of national significance in Gränichen is the Untervogthaus on Lochgasse.

== Notable people ==
- Werner Arber, Nobel-prize winning microbiologist, was born in Gränichen in 1929

== Population ==
Historical population
Year	Pop.	±%
1764	1,226	—
1803	1,897	+54.7%
1850	3,038	+60.1%
1900	2,771	−8.8%
1930	3,459	+24.8%
1950	3,727	+7.7%
1960	4,411	+18.4%
1970	5,298	+20.1%
1980	5,246	−1.0%
1990	5,772	+10.0%
2000	6,115	+5.9%

Gränichen has a population (as of 31 December 2020) of 8,147. As of 2008, 17.6% of the population was made up of foreign nationals. Over the last 10 years the population has grown at a rate of 6.8%. Most of the population (as of 2000) speaks German (90.2%), with Italian being second most common ( 4.1%) and Albanian being third ( 1.5%). Of the rest, 1.1% spoke Serbo Croatian and 0.7% spoke Turkish.

The age distribution, as of 2008, in Gränichen is; 580 children or 9.0% of the population are between 0 and 9 years old and 804 teenagers or 12.5% are between 10 and 19. Of the adult population, 691 people or 10.7% of the population are between 20 and 29 years old. 774 people or 12.0% are between 30 and 39, 1,174 people or 18.2% are between 40 and 49, and 956 people or 14.8% are between 50 and 59. The senior population distribution is 674 people or 10.5% of the population are between 60 and 69 years old, 503 people or 7.8% are between 70 and 79, there are 251 people or 3.9% who are between 80 and 89, and there are 37 people or 0.6% who are 90 and older.

As of 2000, there were 140 homes with 1 or 2 persons in the household, 1,243 homes with 3 or 4 persons in the household, and 1,001 homes with 5 or more persons in the household. The average number of people per household was 2.50 individuals. In 2008 there were 1,357 single family homes (or 47.3% of the total) out of a total of 2,871 homes and apartments.

In the 2007 federal election the most popular party was the SVP which received 40.5% of the vote. The next three most popular parties were the SP (18.4%), the FDP (13.4%) and the Green Party (7.3%).

== Authorities ==
The municipal assembly (Gemeindeversammlung) is the law-making body (legislature). The executive authority is the municipal council (Gemeinderat). The members of the council are elected by the assembly according to the principle of majority. They stay in office for a duration of four years. The council's task is to lead and represent the municipality. In order to do so, he takes care of the decisions of the assembly and the assignments imposed by the canton and the federal government.

The five municipal councils (since 1 January 2012) are:

- Rolf Arber, Mayor
- Hans-Peter Lüem, Vice-Mayor
- Ruedi Gautschi
- Peter Stirnemann
- Peter Hofmann

The district court of Aarau is responsible for matters of civil right.

== Economy ==
As of 2007, Gränichen had an unemployment rate of 1.54%. As of 2005, there were 94 people employed in the primary economic sector and about 45 businesses involved in this sector. 1,098 people are employed in the secondary sector and there are 68 businesses in this sector. 961 people are employed in the tertiary sector, with 155 businesses in this sector.

One of the largest bakeries in Switzerland (Jowa) is located in Gränichen. In addition, there is also a company which fabricates heaters (Zehnder), a gravel plant and several other smaller businesses.

As of 2000 there was a total of 3,149 workers who lived in the municipality. Of these, 2,312 or about 73.4% of the residents worked outside Gränichen while 1,145 people commuted into the municipality for work. There were a total of 1,982 jobs (of at least 6 hours per week) in the municipality.

== Religion ==
From the 2000 census, 1,370 or 22.4% are Roman Catholic, while 3,619 or 59.2% belonged to the Swiss Reformed Church. Of the rest of the population, there are 21 individuals (or about 0.34% of the population) who belong to the Christian Catholic faith, 4.3% were Moslem, 1.1% were Christian-Orthodox and 1.0% belonged to a different religion.

== Transport ==
Gränichen lies on the connecting road from Aarau via Beromünster to Lucerne. The town is also connected to Seon in the Seetal valley. The local public rail service (AAR-Bahn), which goes from Aarau through the Wyna valley up to Menziken, has four stations: Töndler, Gränichen-Dorf, Oberdorf and Bleien. The rails of the public transport were right next to the main street, until they were rebuilt along the Wyna river in 1985.

== Education ==
There are five kindergartens as well as three elementary schools. Furthermore, there is a center for secondary education covering Realschule, Sekundarschule and Bezirksschule levels. The closest gymnasium is in Aarau. Aside from the Castle of Liebegg, there is also an agricultural school.

The entire Swiss population is generally well educated. In Gränichen about 72.7% of the population (between age 25-64) have completed either non-mandatory upper secondary education or additional higher education (either university or a Fachhochschule). Of the school age population (in the 2008/2009 school year), there are 448 students attending primary school, there are 203 students attending secondary school, there are 128 students attending tertiary or university level schooling in the municipality.
