= Biberstein =

- Municipality
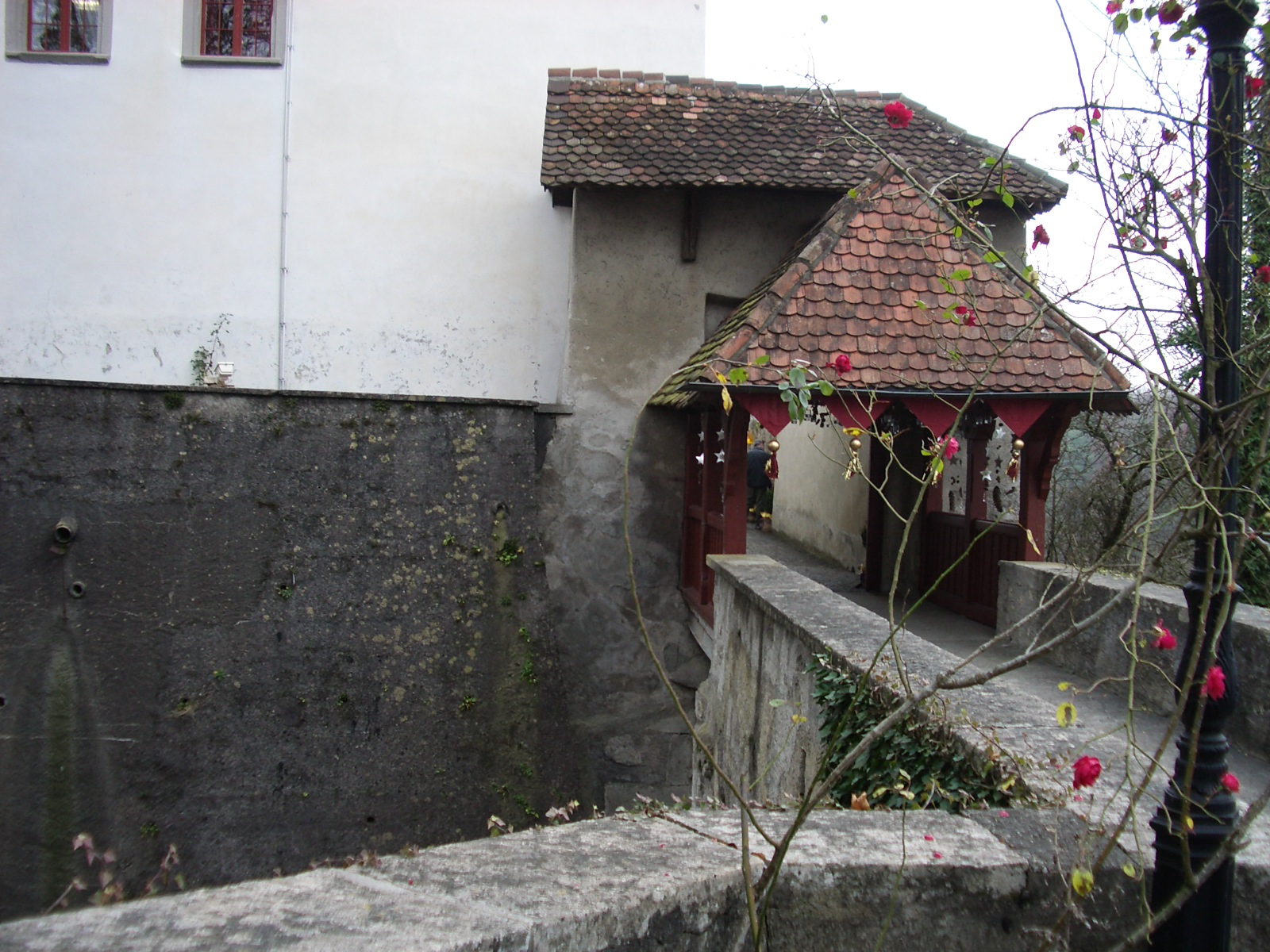

- Flag Coat of arms
- Location of Biberstein
- Location within Switzerland Location within Canton of Aargau
- Coordinates: 47°25′N 8°05′E
- Country: Switzerland
- Canton: Aargau
- District: Aarau

Government
  - Mayor: Peter Frei

Area
  - Total: 4.10 km^{2} (1.58 sq mi)
- Elevation: 391 m (1,283 ft)

Population (December 2020)
  - Total: 1,588
  - Density: 387/km^{2} (1,000/sq mi)
- Time zone: UTC+01:00 (CET)
  - Summer (DST): UTC+02:00 (CEST)
- Postal code: 5023
- SFOS number: 4002
- ISO 3166 code: CH-AG
- Surrounded by: Auenstein, Küttigen, Rohr, Rupperswil, Thalheim
- Website: biberstein-ag.ch

Biberstein (Swiss Standard German pronunciation: [ˈbiːbərʃtaɪn]) is a municipality in the district of Aarau of the canton of Aargau in Switzerland.

Aerial view (1954)

== Geography ==
Biberstein is located on the north bank of the Aar River near Aarau. The town is a 17-minute bus ride from downtown Aarau. The neighboring communities are Auenstein to the east, Küttigen to the west, Rohr to the south, Rupperswil to the south-east and Thalheim to the north-east. The community of Biberstein occupies 4.1 km^{2} (1.6 sq mi) of which 1.81 square kilometers (0.70 sq mi) is wooded.

Biberstein has an area, as of 2006, of 4.1 km^{2} (1.6 sq mi). Of this area, 34.8% is used for agricultural purposes, while 50.6% is forested. Of the rest of the land, 10% is settled (buildings or roads) and the remainder (4.6%) is non-productive (rivers or lakes).

== History ==
Based on archaeologic evidence, the Biberstein area has been inhabited since at least the 6th century. The discoveries have included a grave cut into the surrounding tuff stone, Alamanni graves and a Spatha that was found.

In 2005, the community celebrated the 725 years of Biberstein. In the 13th century the Count of Habsburg-Laufenburg built a castle, Schloss Biberstein, and the surrounding village to limit the territorial expansion of the Counts of Kyburg. The castle's position on the banks of the Aar River allowed them to collect tolls on the Aar ship traffic. Near the castle there was also a ferry that operated between Biberstein and Rohr until the beginning of the Second World War when it was replaced with a bridge.

The village is first mentioned in 1280. Then, the village and castle were mentioned as a city in 1315 as a holding of the Habsburg-Laufenburg family. In 1335 the Knights Hospitaller order in Klingnau became the owners of Biberstein. By 1399 the city had a wall around it. In 1499, during the Swabian War the city was besieged by Bern. In 1527 the city-state of Bern took the castle and appointed a vogt or bailiff to occupy it. A few years later, in 1535, the Knights were forced to sell the city to Bern. This is the last time that Biberstein is mentioned as a city. Following the Napoleonic invasion and collapse of the Swiss Ancien Régime in 1798 Biberstein became part of the District of Aarau in the new Canton Aargau.

== Coat of arms ==
The blazon of the municipal coat of arms is Gules a Beaver Argent sitting on a mount of the same gnawing a piece of wood Or. This is an example of canting with a beaver (German: Biber) sitting on a stone (German: stein).

== Demographics ==
Biberstein has a population (as of 31 December 2020) of 1,588. As of 2008, 10.2% of the population was made up of foreign nationals. Over the last 10 years the population has grown at a rate of 24.1%. Most of the population (as of 2000) speaks German (94.7%), with English being second most common ( 1.0%) and Albanian being third ( 0.8%).

The age distribution, as of 2008, in Biberstein is; 130 children or 9.6% of the population are between 0 and 9 years old and 111 teenagers or 8.2% are between 10 and 19. Of the adult population, 123 people or 9.1% of the population are between 20 and 29 years old. 159 people or 11.8% are between 30 and 39, 226 people or 16.7% are between 40 and 49, and 251 people or 18.6% are between 50 and 59. The senior population distribution is 197 people or 14.6% of the population are between 60 and 69 years old, 123 people or 9.1% are between 70 and 79, there are 30 people or 2.2% who are between 80 and 89, and there are 3 people or 0.2% who are 90 and older.

As of 2000, there were 28 homes with 1 or 2 persons in the household, 168 homes with 3 or 4 persons in the household, and 230 homes with 5 or more persons in the household. The average number of people per household was 2.42 individuals. In 2008 there were 367 single family homes (or 60.7% of the total) out of a total of 605 homes and apartments.

In the 2007 federal election the most popular party was the SVP which received 30.4% of the vote. The next three most popular parties were the SP (25.7%), the FDP (16.2%) and the Green Party (9.8%).

The entire Swiss population is generally well educated. In Biberstein about 81% of the population (between age 25–64) have completed either non-mandatory upper secondary education or additional higher education (either university or a Fachhochschule). Of the school age population (in the 2008/2009 school year), there are 86 students attending primary school in the municipality.

The historical population is given in the following table:

Historical population
Year	Pop.	±%
1764	307	—
1850	761	+147.9%
1888	594	−21.9%
1900	651	+9.6%
1930	549	−15.7%
1950	652	+18.8%
2000	1,101	+68.9%

== Sights ==
The village of Biberstein is designated as part of the Inventory of Swiss Heritage Sites.

== Economy ==
As of 2007, Biberstein had an unemployment rate of 0.72%. As of 2005, there were 24 people employed in the primary economic sector and about 8 businesses involved in this sector. 9 people are employed in the secondary sector and there are 5 businesses in this sector. 162 people are employed in the tertiary sector, with 25 businesses in this sector.

As of 2000 there were 641 total workers who lived in the municipality. Of these, 518 or about 80.8% of the residents worked outside Biberstein while 112 people commuted into the municipality for work. There were a total of 235 jobs (of at least 6 hours per week) in the municipality.

== Religion ==
From the 2000 census, 236 or 21.4% are Roman Catholic, while 678 or 61.6% belonged to the Swiss Reformed Church. Of the rest of the population, there are 2 individuals (or about 0.18% of the population) who belong to the Christian Catholic faith.
