= Biberstein Castle =

Castle in Biberstein, Switzerland

- Schloss Biberstein
- Biberstein
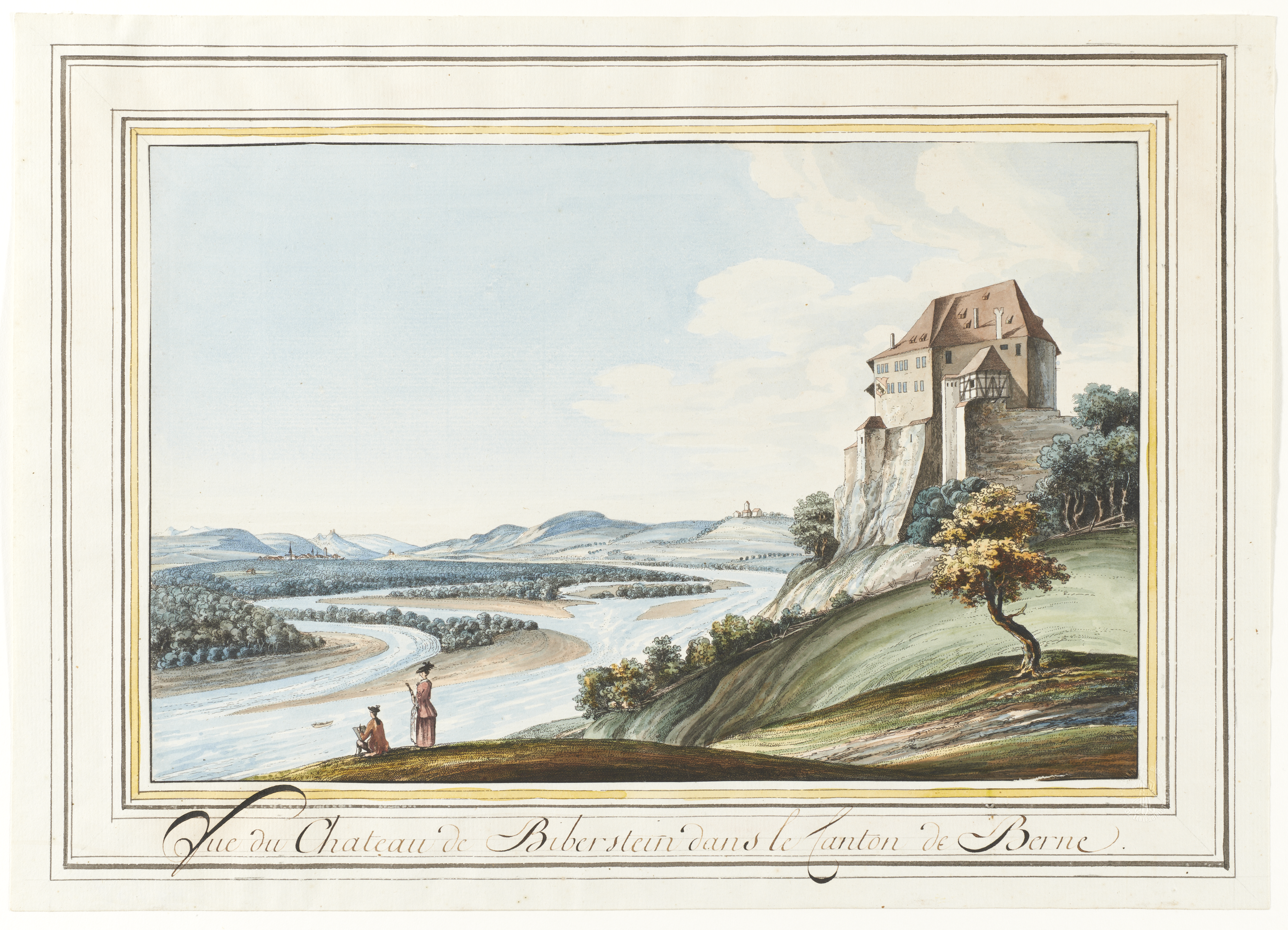
- Picture by Caspar Wolf (1735–1783)

Site information
- Code: CH-AG
- Condition: preserved

Location
- Location within Switzerland
- Coordinates: 47°24′47.60″N 8°5′0.70″E

Site history
- Built: around 1280

Biberstein Castle (German: Schloss Biberstein) is a castle in the municipality of Biberstein in the Swiss canton of Aargau.

== History ==
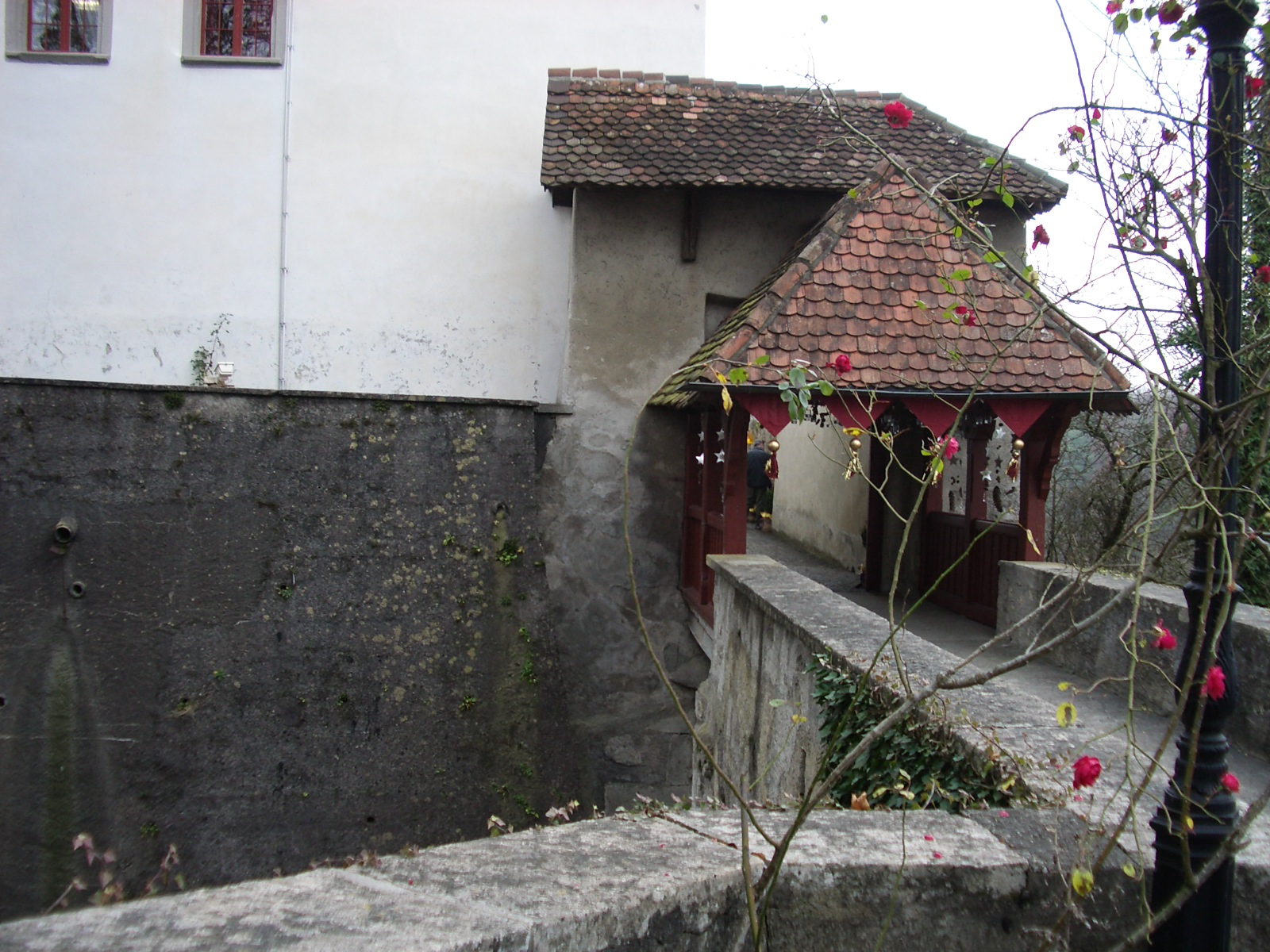
Castle entrance

The municipality of Biberstein, probably including the castle, is first mentioned in 1280 which indicates a late 13th century construction date. The castle was built for the Counts of Habsburg-Laufenburg. By 1319 Biberstein was listed as a town, though no town charter or market was mentioned. In 1335 the Habsburgs sold the castle and town to Rudolf von Büttikon who established a Knights Hospitaller commandry in the castle. After 1368 the Habsburgs attempted to secretly repurchase Biberstein Castle from the Knights by using a minor noble as a straw purchaser. However, the Knights refused an exchange or purchase. By 1399 the town of Biberstein was fortified with a ring wall.

In 1415 the city-state of Bern occupied part of Aargau including Biberstein, though the Knights continued to own and rule over the town and castle. During the Swabian War of 1499 Bernese troops occupied Biberstein Castle to protect their northern border. In 1527 Bern adopted the new faith of the Protestant Reformation and began to suppress the monasteries in their lands. In the following year a Bernese vogt occupied the castle and administered the lands around Biberstein. The Knights protested, but in 1535 the commander of the Knights, Johann von Hattstein, was forced to sell the castle to Bern, which gave the city de jure ownership. The document selling the Knights' estates is the last time Biberstein was referred to as a town.

After 1535 the castle became the seat of one of the smallest vogtei in the Canton of Bern. In the period between 1535 and 1798 a total of 51 vogt ruled over the land. However, as one of the smallest and poorest vogtei, most office holders sought additional or other appointments as soon as possible. In 1587 the castle was gutted by a fire. A suspected witch, Elsa Schiblerin, was accused of causing the fire and burned at the stake. Over the next few years the castle was rebuilt by the city of Bern. The castle was rebuilt as a more comfortable home for the resident vogt. The Biberstein coat of arms was painted above the main gate in 1627 and in 1643 Hans Balthasar Fisch painted the Bernese coat of arms on the tower. A fire in 1784 threatened the castle, but a quick response limited the damage to the roof.

The 1798 French invasion and the Helvetic Republic swept away the old system of vogt and vogtei. With the creation of the Canton of Aargau in the 1803 Act of Mediation the three villages of the old vogtei; Biberstein, Küttigen and Erlinsbach, were combined into one municipality and the castle became the property of the new canton. The castle was renovated in 1889 and became a home for children. It became a home for mentally handicapped adults in 1987.

== Castle site ==
The castle sits on a tuff hill above the Aare river. Of the medieval castle, only portions of the outer wall and the foundations of the donjon remain. The remaining walls and castle structure generally date to the 16th century reconstruction or later renovation projects.

== See also ==
- List of castles and fortresses in Switzerland

== Literature ==
- Stettler, Michael (1948). Gesellschaft für Schweizerische Kunstgeschichte: Die Kunstdenkmäler des Kantons Aargau. Vol. Band I: Die Bezirke Aarau, Kulm, Zofingen. Basel: Birkhäuser Verlag. pp. 135–138.
