= Aarau District =

Coordinates: 47°23′N 8°2′E

Aarau District Bezirk Aarau
- District
- Country: Switzerland
- Canton: Aargau
- Capital: Aarau

Area
  - Total: 104.47 km^{2} (40.34 sq mi)

Population (2020)
  - Total: 80,309
  - Density: 768.73/km^{2} (1,991.0/sq mi)
- Time zone: UTC+1 (CET)
  - Summer (DST): UTC+2 (CEST)
- Municipalities: 12

Aarau District is a district in the Swiss canton of Aargau. Its administrative capital is located in Aarau. It encompasses the agglomeration of Aarau south of the Jura Mountains.

== Geography ==
In 2009, the Aargau District had a total area of 104.48 square kilometers (40.34 sq mi). Of that area, 32.06 km^{2} (12.38 sq mi), or about 30.7%, was cultivated land, 50.38 km^{2} (19.45 sq mi), or about 48.2%, was forested and 21.02 km^{2} (8.12 sq mi), or about 20.1%, has some type of construction on it.

== Demographics ==
In December 2018, Aarau District had a population of 80,309.

In 2000, there were 3,277 homes with 1 or 2 persons in the household, 14,181 homes with 3 or 4 persons in the household, and 9,295 homes with 5 or more persons in the household. The average number of people per household was 2.24 individuals. In 2008, there were 10,614 single family homes (or 32.3% of the total) out of a total of 32,851 homes and apartments.

Of the school age population (in the 2008/2009 school year), there were 4,891 students attending primary school, 1,755 students attending secondary school, 1,175 students attending tertiary or university level schooling and 35 students who are seeking a job after school in the municipality.

== Economy ==
In 2000, there were 32,987 residents who worked in the district, while 23,730 residents worked outside the Aarau District and 29,444 people commuted into the district for work.

== Religion ==
From the 2000 census, 17,246 or 27.3% were Roman Catholic, while 31,124 or 49.3% belonged to the Swiss Reformed Church. Of the rest of the population, there are 179 individuals (or about 0.28% of the population) who belong to the Christian Catholic faith.

== Municipalities ==
Crest	Name of municipality	Population (31 December 2020)	Area in km^{2}
Aarau	Aarau	21,726	12.34^{a}
Biberstein	Biberstein	1,588	4.10
Buchs	Buchs (AG)	8,121	5.36
Densbüren	Densbüren	728	12.52
Erlinsbach	Erlinsbach	4,400	9.87
Gränichen	Gränichen	8,147	17.21
Hirschthal	Hirschthal	1,645	3.53
Küttigen	Küttigen	6,295	11.89
Muhen	Muhen	3,985	7.03
Oberentfelden	Oberentfelden	8,568	7.16
Suhr	Suhr	10,724	10.59
Unterentfelden	Unterentfelden	4,382	2.87
	Total	80,309	104.47

^a In 2010, Rohr merged into Aarau, Aarau area includes Rohr

=== Mergers ===
The following changes to the district's municipalities have occurred since 2000:

- 2010: Rohr merged into Aarau
