= Holziken =

- Municipality
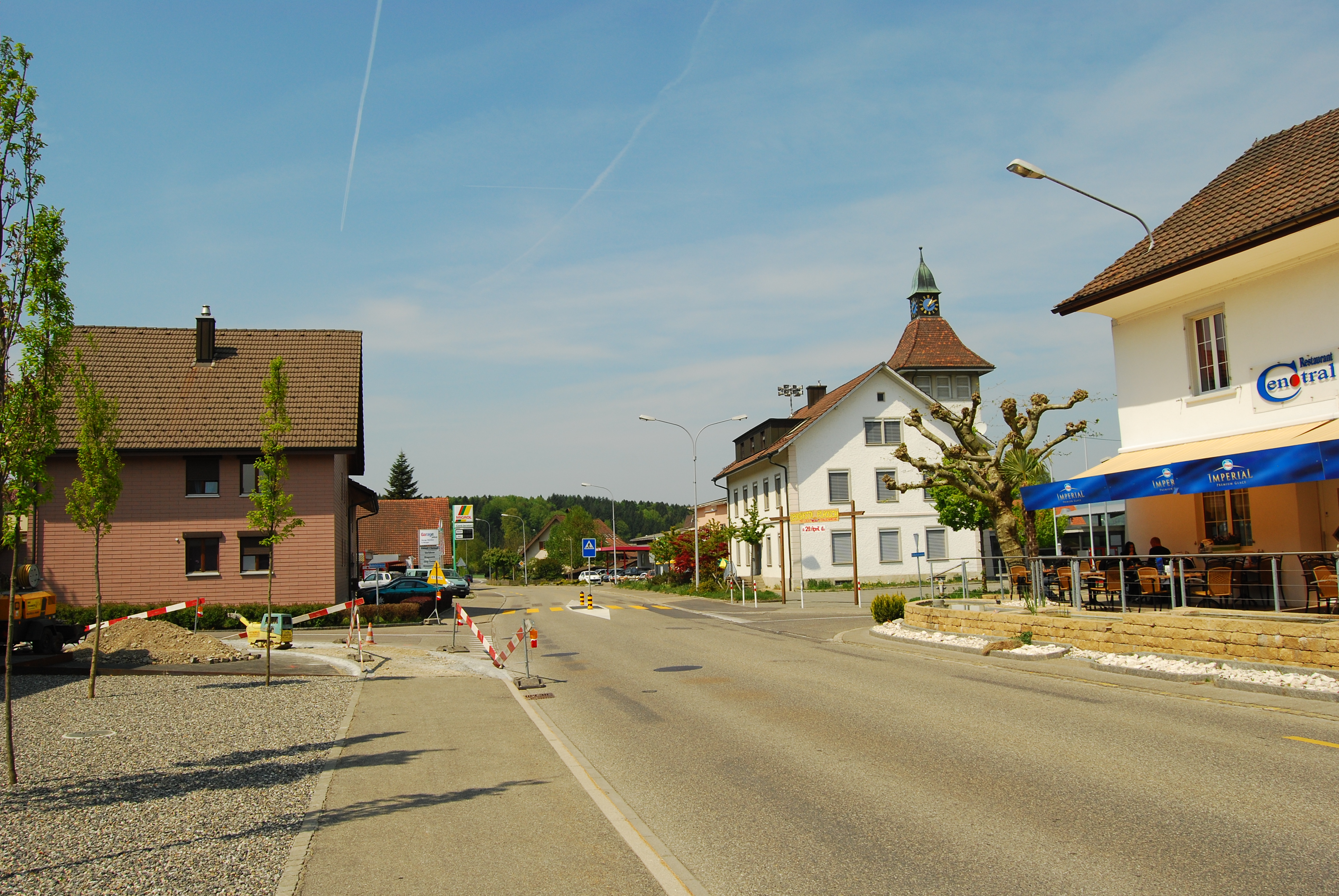

- Flag Coat of arms
- Location of Holziken
- Location within Switzerland Location within Canton of Aargau
- Coordinates: 47°19′N 8°2′E
- Country: Switzerland
- Canton: Aargau
- District: Kulm

Area
  - Total: 2.86 km^{2} (1.10 sq mi)
- Elevation: 443 m (1,453 ft)

Population (December 2006)
  - Total: 1,162
  - Density: 406/km^{2} (1,050/sq mi)
- Time zone: UTC+01:00 (CET)
  - Summer (DST): UTC+02:00 (CEST)
- Postal code: 5043
- SFOS number: 4136
- ISO 3166 code: CH-AG
- Surrounded by: Hirschthal, Kölliken, Muhen, Schöftland, Uerkheim
- Website: www.holziken.ch

Holziken is a municipality in the district of Kulm in the canton of Aargau in Switzerland.

Aerial view (1970)

== History ==
Holziken is first mentioned in 1306 as Helzinkon. The major land holders in the village included the Abbey of St. Gall and knights that were vassals of the Habsburgs. Between 1415 and 1798 the village was under the authority of the city of Bern. In 1528 the Protestant Reformation was introduced in the village. Under the short lived Helvetic Republic, it belonged to the Zofingen district. Then, in 1803 it became part of the Kulm district in the newly formed Canton of Aargau.

The main economic sources, in the 18th and 19th centuries, were agriculture and home cotton processing. Today the main sources of income include agriculture (about 10% of the total employment in 2000) and factories for the production of office furniture and interiors. Despite local industry, Holziken has a marked commuter population (in 2000 521 commuted away, while only 81 commuted into the municipality).

== Geography ==
Holziken has an area, as of 2009, of 2.86 square kilometers (1.10 sq mi). Of this area, 1.25 square kilometers (0.48 sq mi) or 43.7% is used for agricultural purposes, while 1.13 square kilometers (0.44 sq mi) or 39.5% is forested. Of the rest of the land, 0.45 square kilometers (0.17 sq mi) or 15.7% is settled (buildings or roads), 0.01 km^{2} (2.5 acres) or 0.3% is either rivers or lakes and 0.03 km^{2} (7.4 acres) or 1.0% is unproductive land.

Of the built up area, housing and buildings made up 9.8% and transportation infrastructure made up 3.1%. Power and water infrastructure as well as other special developed areas made up 1.7% of the area. 38.5% of the total land area is heavily forested. Of the agricultural land, 31.8% is used for growing crops and 10.1% is pastures, while 1.7% is used for orchards or vine crops. All the water in the municipality is in rivers and streams.

The municipality is located in the Kulm district, between the Uerke and the Suhre rivers.

== Coat of arms ==
The blazon of the municipal coat of arms is Argent three Wood Slices Or on a Chevron Sable. It is an example of canting with the round wood discs (German: Rundholzscheiben) which are a visual pun on the word for wood (German: holz) in the municipality's name.

== Demographics ==
Holziken has a population (as of December 2020) of 1,543. As of June 2009, 15.5% of the population are foreign nationals. Over the last 10 years (1997–2007) the population has changed at a rate of -6.1%. Most of the population (as of 2000) speaks German (90.2%), with Albanian being second most common ( 2.4%) and Italian being third ( 2.2%).

The age distribution, as of 2008, in Holziken is; 98 children or 8.4% of the population are between 0 and 9 years old and 135 teenagers or 11.6% are between 10 and 19. Of the adult population, 160 people or 13.8% of the population are between 20 and 29 years old. 165 people or 14.2% are between 30 and 39, 214 people or 18.4% are between 40 and 49, and 175 people or 15.1% are between 50 and 59. The senior population distribution is 116 people or 10.0% of the population are between 60 and 69 years old, 62 people or 5.3% are between 70 and 79, there are 29 people or 2.5% who are between 80 and 89, and there are 6 people or 0.5% who are 90 and older.

As of 2000 the average number of residents per living room was 0.58 which is about equal to the cantonal average of 0.57 per room. In this case, a room is defined as space of a housing unit of at least 4 m^{2} (43 sq ft) as normal bedrooms, dining rooms, living rooms, kitchens and habitable cellars and attics. About 49.3% of the total households were owner occupied, or in other words did not pay rent (though they may have a mortgage or a rent-to-own agreement).

As of 2000, there were 38 homes with 1 or 2 persons in the household, 250 homes with 3 or 4 persons in the household, and 168 homes with 5 or more persons in the household. The average number of people per household was 2.52 individuals. As of 2000, there were 465 private households (homes and apartments) in the municipality, and an average of 2.5 persons per household. In 2008 there were 197 single family homes (or 39.2% of the total) out of a total of 502 homes and apartments. There were a total of 6 empty apartments for a 1.2% vacancy rate. As of 2007, the construction rate of new housing units was 1.7 new units per 1000 residents.

In the 2007 federal election the most popular party was the SVP which received 68.5% of the vote. The next three most popular parties were the FDP (7.8%), the SP (5.5%) and the CVP (4.4%).

The entire Swiss population is generally well educated. In Holziken about 69% of the population (between age 25-64) have completed either non-mandatory upper secondary education or additional higher education (either university or a Fachhochschule). Of the school age population (in the 2008/2009 school year), there are 65 students attending primary school in the municipality.

The historical population is given in the following table:

Historical population
Year	Pop.	±%
1653	140	—
1850	343	+145.0%
1900	372	+8.5%
1950	474	+27.4%
1970	649	+36.9%
2000	1,184	+82.4%

== Economy ==
As of 2007, Holziken had an unemployment rate of 1.62%. As of 2005, there were 24 people employed in the primary economic sector and about 9 businesses involved in this sector. 43 people are employed in the secondary sector and there are 11 businesses in this sector. 84 people are employed in the tertiary sector, with 25 businesses in this sector.

In 2000 there were 671 workers who lived in the municipality. Of these, 570 or about 84.9% of the residents worked outside Holziken while 80 people commuted into the municipality for work. There were a total of 181 jobs (of at least 6 hours per week) in the municipality. Of the working population, 8.1% used public transportation to get to work, and 63.5% used a private car.

== Religion ==
From the 2000 census, 248 or 20.9% were Roman Catholic, while 720 or 60.8% belonged to the Swiss Reformed Church. Of the rest of the population, there was 1 individual who belonged to the Christian Catholic faith.
