= Schafisheim =

- Municipality
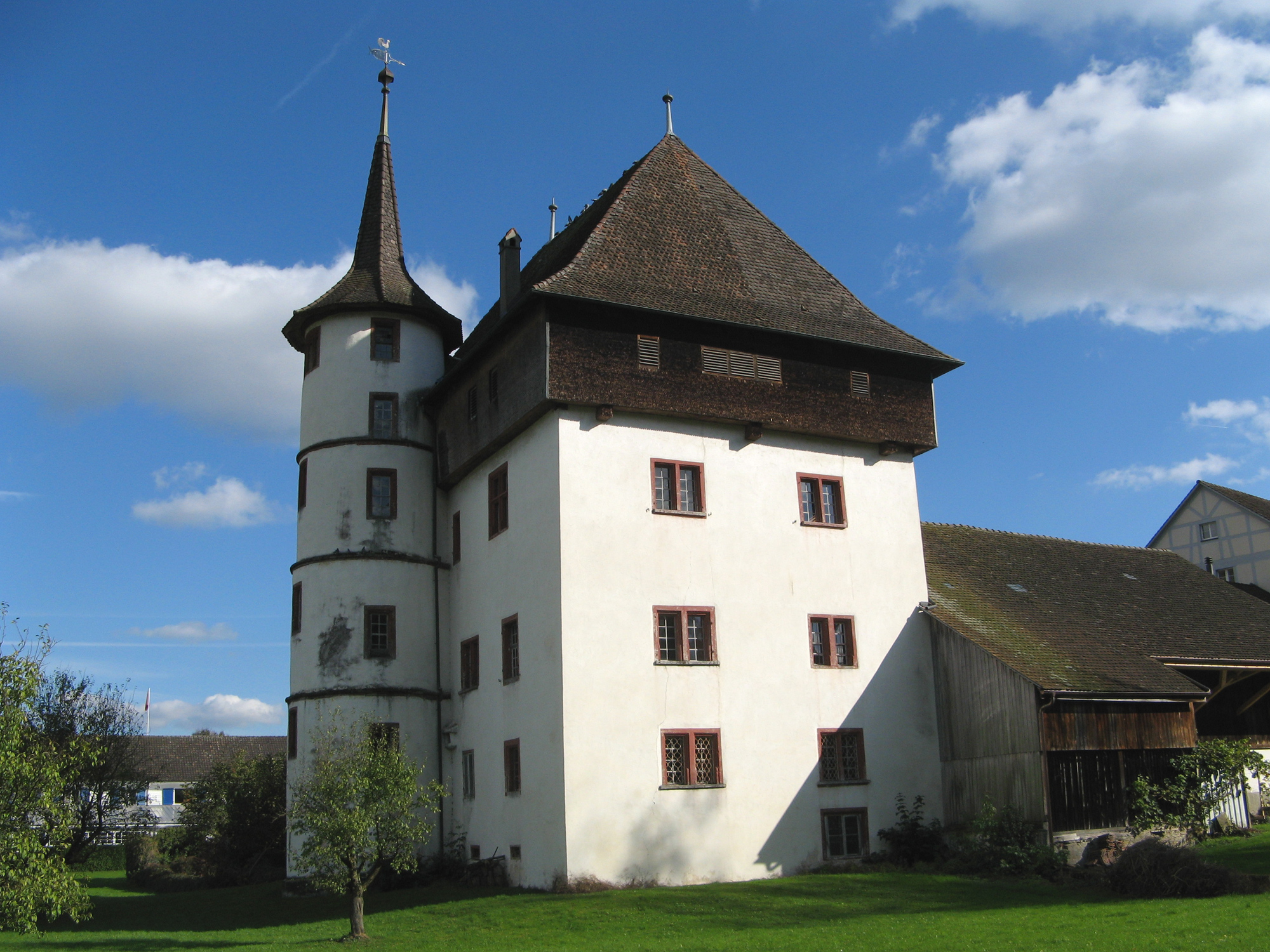

- Flag Coat of arms
- Location of Schafisheim
- Location within Switzerland Location within Canton of Aargau
- Coordinates: 47°23′N 8°9′E
- Country: Switzerland
- Canton: Aargau
- District: Lenzburg

Area
  - Total: 6.33 km^{2} (2.44 sq mi)
- Elevation: 419 m (1,375 ft)

Population (December 2006)
  - Total: 2,658
  - Density: 420/km^{2} (1,090/sq mi)
- Time zone: UTC+01:00 (CET)
  - Summer (DST): UTC+02:00 (CEST)
- Postal code: 5503
- SFOS number: 4207
- ISO 3166 code: CH-AG
- Surrounded by: Gränichen, Hunzenschwil, Rupperswil, Seon, Staufen
- Website: www.schafisheim.ch

Schafisheim is a municipality in the district of Lenzburg in the canton of Aargau in Switzerland.

== History ==
Aerial view (1954)

Evidence of earlier settlements near Schafisheim include urn graves of the Hallstatt period and a Roman era farm. The modern village of Schafisheim is first mentioned around 1261–64 as Scafusa. The high court right was held by the Habsburgs, and then from 1415 by Bern. A farm owned by Murbach Abbey had the Twinggericht (low justice and property rights) over the village, which was held until 1482. The Twinggericht right went to the Lords of Baldegg, then, in 1671, to a branch of the Hallwyl family. In the 15th century the head Twingherren was probably living at Schafisheim Castle. After passing through several other hands, the Twingherren power came in 1736 to the brothers Samuel and Etienne Brutel.

Schafisheim chapel of ease is first mentioned in 1360. At that time it belonged to the Staufen parish. In 1496–98, the chapel of St. Leodegar was built on the site of the earlier chapel. The farming settlement of Bettetal was incorporated in 1751 in the municipality.

Economically, Schafisheim was dominated by agriculture and a little viticulture together with light, home manufacturing in the 19th century. The brothers Brutel built a thriving printing business in 1736, which closed before 1800. In the 19th and 20th centuries, many residents worked in foreign factories. The opening of the A1 motorway in 1967 led to the establishment of logistics centers and furniture stores, and in 1973 the cantonal road traffic office. Along the road between Aarau and Lenzburg the village expanded with new residential and commercial areas.

== Geography ==
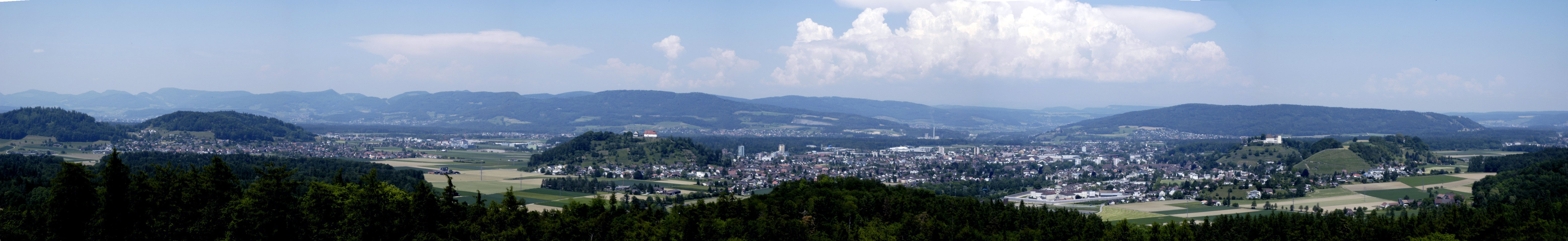
Panorama of the Lenzburg region with Schlossberg and Staufburg, the town of Lenzburg (right) and the villages of Staufen (centre) and Schafisheim (left)

Schafisheim has an area, as of 2009, of 6.33 square kilometers (2.44 sq mi). Of this area, 2.41 km^{2} (0.93 sq mi) or 38.1% is used for agricultural purposes, while 2.6 km^{2} (1.0 sq mi) or 41.1% is forested. Of the rest of the land, 1.32 km^{2} (0.51 sq mi) or 20.9% is settled (buildings or roads), 0.03 km^{2} (7.4 acres) or 0.5% is either rivers or lakes.

Of the built up area, industrial buildings made up 3.2% of the total area while housing and buildings made up 9.5% and transportation infrastructure made up 5.1%. Power and water infrastructure as well as other special developed areas made up 2.8% of the area Out of the forested land, all of the forested land area is covered with heavy forests. Of the agricultural land, 24.5% is used for growing crops and 11.4% is pastures, while 2.2% is used for orchards or vine crops. All the water in the municipality is in rivers and streams.

The municipality is located in the Lenzburg district, at the lower exit of the Seetal. It consists of the village of Schafisheim and the hamlets of Bettetal and Heuelmüli.

== Coat of arms ==
The blazon of the municipal coat of arms is Gules a Ewe passant Argent. This is an example of canting with the ewe or sheep (German: Schaf) representing the name of the municipality."

== Demographics ==
Schafisheim has a population (as of December 2020) of 3,044. As of June 2009, 17.5% of the population are foreign nationals. Over the last 10 years (1997–2007) the population has changed at a rate of 8.2%. Most of the population (as of 2000) speaks German (90.7%), with Italian being second most common ( 2.7%) and Albanian being third ( 1.5%).

The age distribution, as of 2008, in Schafisheim is; 282 children or 10.5% of the population are between 0 and 9 years old and 381 teenagers or 14.2% are between 10 and 19. Of the adult population, 289 people or 10.8% of the population are between 20 and 29 years old. 343 people or 12.8% are between 30 and 39, 468 people or 17.4% are between 40 and 49, and 407 people or 15.2% are between 50 and 59. The senior population distribution is 305 people or 11.4% of the population are between 60 and 69 years old, 147 people or 5.5% are between 70 and 79, there are 55 people or 2.0% who are between 80 and 89, and there are 8 people or 0.3% who are 90 and older.

As of 2000, there were 83 homes with 1 or 2 persons in the household, 452 homes with 3 or 4 persons in the household, and 420 homes with 5 or more persons in the household. As of 2000, there were 970 private households (homes and apartments) in the municipality, and an average of 2.6 persons per household. In 2008 there were 572 single family homes (or 50.6% of the total) out of a total of 1,130 homes and apartments. There were a total of 17 empty apartments for a 1.5% vacancy rate. As of 2007, the construction rate of new housing units was 3.7 new units per 1000 residents.

In the 2007 federal election the most popular party was the SVP which received 38.4% of the vote. The next three most popular parties were the SP (17%), the FDP (11.1%) and the Green Party (9.2%).

The historical population is given in the following table:

Historical population
Year	Pop.	±%
1764	577	—
1831	1,131	+96.0%
1850	1,068	−5.6%
1900	868	−18.7%
1950	1,383	+59.3%
2000	2,656	+92.0%
2010	2,795	+5.2%
2020	3,062	+9.6%

== Heritage sites of national significance ==
The Haus Urech (Urech House) at Seetalstrasse 27 and the Schlössli (small castle) at Lenzburgerstrasse 5, 7 are listed as Swiss heritage sites of national significance.

== Economy ==
As of 2007, Schafisheim had an unemployment rate of 1.76%. As of 2005, there were 76 people employed in the primary economic sector and about 19 businesses involved in this sector. 421 people are employed in the secondary sector and there are 30 businesses in this sector. 1,440 people are employed in the tertiary sector, with 74 businesses in this sector.

In 2000 there were 1,361 workers who lived in the municipality. Of these, 1,058 or about 77.7% of the residents worked outside Schafisheim while 1,245 people commuted into the municipality for work. There were a total of 1,548 jobs (of at least 6 hours per week) in the municipality. Of the working population, 10.7% used public transportation to get to work, and 58.2% used a private car.

== Religion ==
From the 2000 census, 565 or 22.4% were Roman Catholic, while 1,426 or 56.6% belonged to the Swiss Reformed Church. Of the rest of the population, there were 2 individuals (or about 0.08% of the population) who belonged to the Christian Catholic faith.

== Education ==
In Schafisheim about 74.5% of the population (between age 25 and 64) have completed either non-mandatory upper secondary education or additional higher education (either university or a Fachhochschule). Of the school age population (in the 2008/2009 school year), there are 304 students attending primary school, there are 182 students attending secondary school in the municipality.
