= Rohr, Aargau =

Rohr
- Former municipality
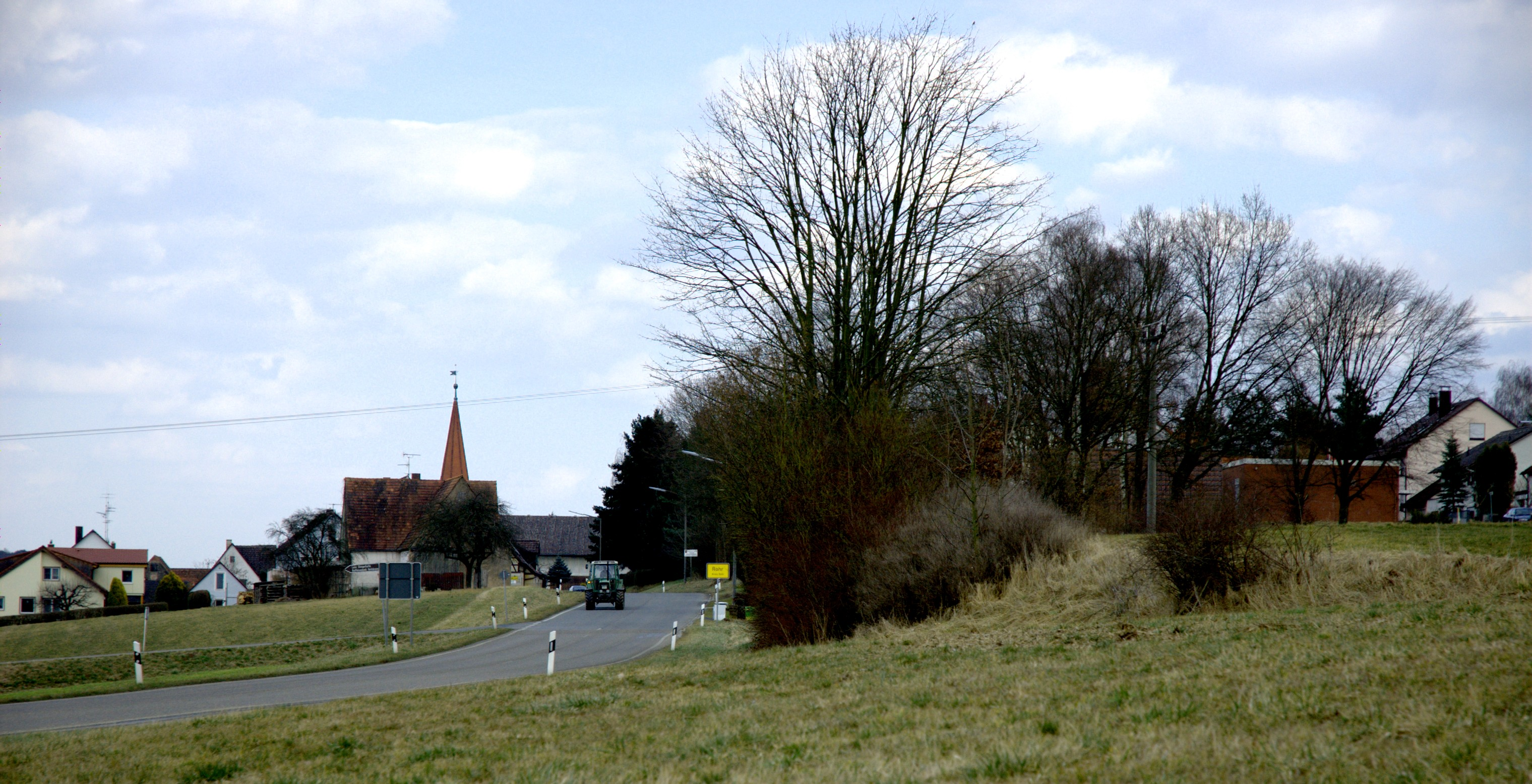

- Flag Coat of arms
- Location of Rohr
- Location within Switzerland Location within Canton of Aargau
- Coordinates: 47°24′N 8°5′E
- Country: Switzerland
- Canton: Aargau
- District: Aarau
- Municipality: Aarau

Area
  - Total: 3.40 km^{2} (1.31 sq mi)
- Elevation: 375 m (1,230 ft)

Population (December 2020)
  - Total: 3,249
  - Density: 956/km^{2} (2,470/sq mi)
- Time zone: UTC+01:00 (CET)
  - Summer (DST): UTC+02:00 (CEST)
- Postal code: 5032
- SFOS number: 4011
- ISO 3166 code: CH-AG
- Surrounded by: Aarau, Auenstein, Biberstein, Buchs, Küttigen, Rupperswil
- Website: www.rohr-ag.ch

Until the first of January 2010 Rohr (German pronunciation: [ʁoːɐ̯]) was a municipality in the district of Aarau in the canton of Aargau in Switzerland.

At the beginning of 2010 Rohr became a suburb of Aarau.

== History ==
Rohr is first mentioned in 1027 as Rore.

== Geography ==
Rohr has an area, as of 2006, of 3.4 km^{2} (1.3 sq mi). Of this area, 31.7% is used for agricultural purposes, while 39.2% is forested. Of the rest of the land, 22.7% is settled (buildings or roads) and the remainder (6.4%) is non-productive (rivers or lakes).

The municipality is located in the Aarau district, and since 1 January 2010 has been part of the municipality of Aarau. It consisted of the linear village of Rohr on a terrace above the Aare river valley.

== Coat of arms ==
The blazon of the municipal coat of arms is Argent three Bulrushes Vert fructed Sable issuant from Coupeaux of the second.

== Demographics ==
Rohr has a population (as of 31 December 2020) of 3,249. As of 2008, 22.5% of the population was made up of foreign nationals. Over the last 10 years the population has grown at a rate of 15.9%. Most of the population (as of 2000) speaks German (87.9%), with Italian being second most common (3.4%) and Serbo-Croatian being third (2.4%).

The age distribution, as of 2008, in Rohr is; 339 children or 10.4% of the population are between 0 and 9 years old and 299 teenagers or 9.2% are between 10 and 19. Of the adult population, 496 people or 15.2% of the population are between 20 and 29 years old. 505 people or 15.5% are between 30 and 39, 506 people or 15.5% are between 40 and 49, and 459 people or 14.1% are between 50 and 59. The senior population distribution is 352 people or 10.8% of the population are between 60 and 69 years old, 183 people or 5.6% are between 70 and 79, there are 96 people or 2.9% who are between 80 and 89, and there are 28 people or 0.9% who are 90 and older.

As of 2000, there were 125 homes with 1 or 2 persons in the household, 712 homes with 3 or 4 persons in the household, and 328 homes with 5 or more persons in the household. The average number of people per household was 2.21 individuals. In 2008 there were 385 single family homes (or 24.5% of the total) out of a total of 1,574 homes and apartments.

In the 2007 federal election the most popular party was the SVP which received 40.8% of the vote. The next three most popular parties were the SP (20.2%), the FDP (15.1%) and the CVP (6.9%).

The entire Swiss population is generally well educated. In Rohr about 72.1% of the population (between age 25–64) have completed either non-mandatory upper secondary education or additional higher education (either University or a Fachhochschule). Of the school age population (in the 2008/2009 school year), there are 225 students attending primary school, there are 138 students attending secondary school in the municipality.

The historical population is given in the following table:

year	population
Around 1340	10
1558	2 houses
1764	129
1803	257
1850	389
1900	595
1970	2,459
2000	2,652

== Economy ==
As of 2007, Rohr had an unemployment rate of 1.85%. As of 2005, there were 16 people employed in the primary economic sector and about 6 businesses involved in this sector. 273 people are employed in the secondary sector and there are 21 businesses in this sector. 302 people are employed in the tertiary sector, with 65 businesses in this sector.

As of 2000 there were 1,484 total workers who lived in the municipality. Of these, 1,295 or about 87.3% of the residents worked outside Rohr while 345 people commuted into the municipality for work. There were a total of 534 jobs (of at least 6 hours per week) in the municipality.

== Religion ==
From the 2000 census, 743 or 28.0% are Roman Catholic, while 1,309 or 49.4% belonged to the Swiss Reformed Church. Of the rest of the population, there are 14 individuals (or about 0.53% of the population) who belong to the Christian Catholic faith.
