= Unterentfelden =

- Municipality
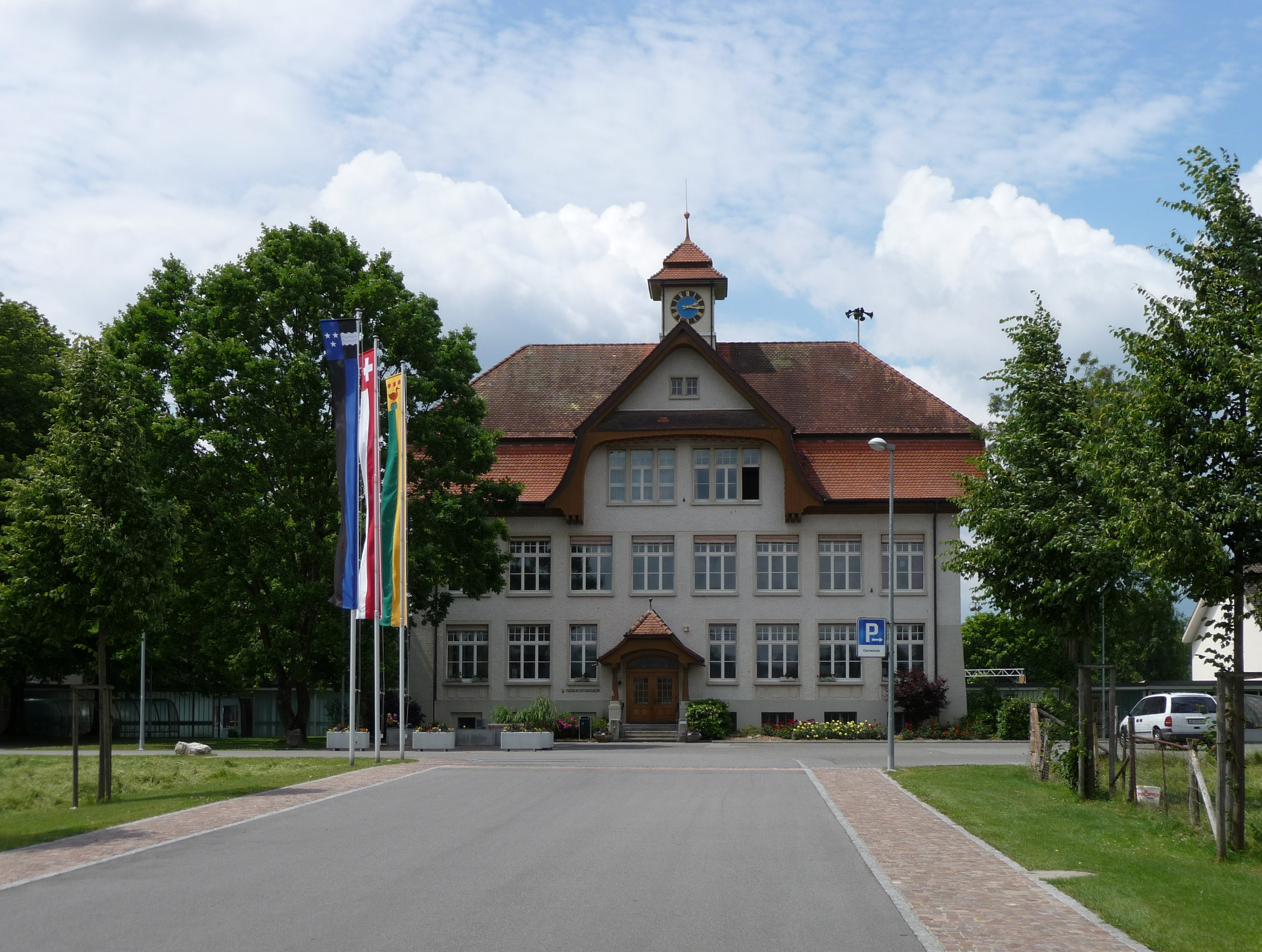
- Unterentfelden Town Hall

- Flag Coat of arms
- Location of Unterentfelden
- Location within Switzerland Location within Canton of Aargau
- Coordinates: 47°22′N 8°2′E
- Country: Switzerland
- Canton: Aargau
- District: Aarau

Area
  - Total: 2.87 km^{2} (1.11 sq mi)
- Elevation: 417 m (1,368 ft)

Population (December 2020)
  - Total: 4,382
  - Density: 1,530/km^{2} (3,950/sq mi)
- Time zone: UTC+01:00 (CET)
  - Summer (DST): UTC+02:00 (CEST)
- Postal code: 5035
- SFOS number: 4013
- ISO 3166 code: CH-AG
- Surrounded by: Aarau, Eppenberg-Wöschnau (SO), Oberentfelden, Schönenwerd (SO), Suhr
- Website: http://www.unterentfelden.ch

Unterentfelden is a municipality in the district of Aarau of the Canton of Aargau in Switzerland.

== Geography ==
Aerial view (1965)

Unterentfelden has an area, as of 2006, of 2.9 km^{2} (1.1 sq mi). Of this area, 32.2% is used for agricultural purposes, while 30.4% is forested. Of the rest of the land, 37% is settled (buildings or roads) and the remainder (0.3%) is non-productive (rivers or lakes).

== Coat of arms ==
The blazon of the municipal coat of arms is of a "Duck Marron statant on Coupeaux Vert and in chief three Mullets Gules in fess".

== Demographics ==
Unterentfelden has a population (as of 31 December 2020) of 4,382. As of 2008, 21.5% of the population was made up of foreign nationals. Over the last 10 years the population has grown at a rate of 16.4%. Most of the population (as of 2000) speaks German (88.2%), with Italian being second most common (4.0%) and Serbo-Croatian being third ( 1.9%).

As of 2008, the age distribution in Unterentfelden was as follows: 369 children or 9.8% of the population were between 0 and 9 years old and 389 teenagers or 10.3% were between 10 and 19. Of the adult population, 480 people or 12.7% of the population were between 20 and 29 years old. 514 people or 13.6% were between 30 and 39, 617 people or 16.4% were between 40 and 49, and 449 people or 11.9% were between 50 and 59. The senior population distribution was 427 people or 11.3% of the population were between 60 and 69 years old, 310 people or 8.2% were between 70 and 79, there were 186 people or 4.9% who were between 80 and 89, and there were 27 people or 0.7% who were 90 and older.

As of 2000, there were 145 homes with 1 or 2 persons in the household, 681 homes with 3 or 4 persons in the household, and 534 homes with 5 or more persons in the household. The average number of people per household was 2.28 individuals. In 2008 there were 685 single family homes (or 38.2% of the total) out of a total of 1,794 homes and apartments.

In the 2007 federal election the most popular party was the SVP, which received 36.4% of the vote. The next three most popular parties were the FDP (16.7%), the SP (16.6%) and the CVP (8.8%).

The historical population is given in the following table:

Historical population
| Year | Pop. | ±% |
|---|---|---|
| 1975 | 3,156 | — |
| 1980 | 3,125 | −1.0% |
| 1990 | 3,341 | +6.9% |
| 2000 | 3,217 | −3.7% |

== Education ==
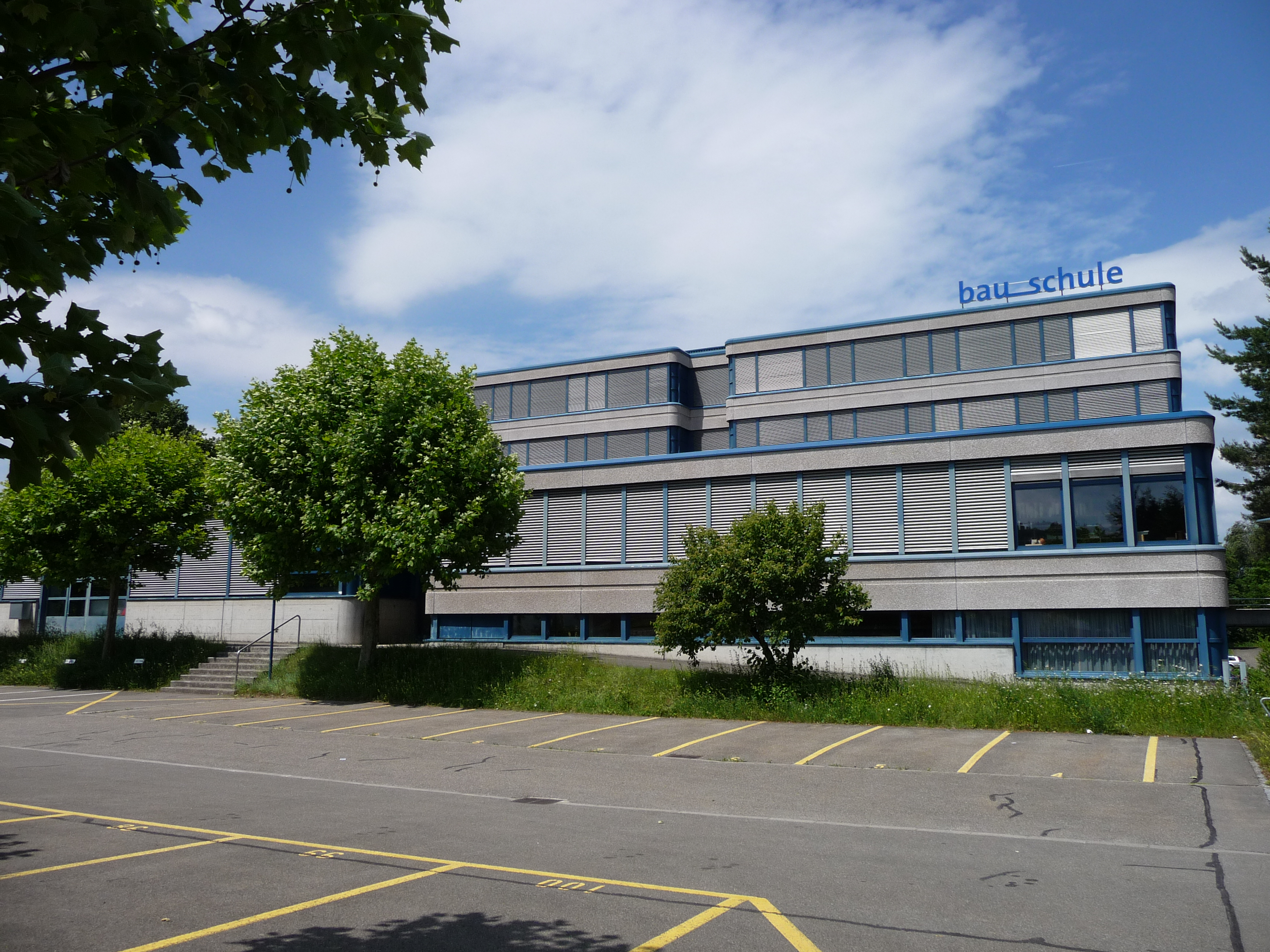
Swiss Bauschule or Construction management college in Unterentfelden

In Unterentfelden about 75.4% of the population (between age 25-64) have completed either non-mandatory upper secondary education or additional higher education (either university or a Fachhochschule). Of the school age population (in the 2008/2009 school year), there are 314 students attending primary school, there are 60 students attending secondary school in the municipality.

== Economy ==
As of 2007, Unterentfelden had an unemployment rate of 1.77%. As of 2005, there were 12 people employed in the primary economic sector and about 5 businesses involved in this sector. 576 people are employed in the secondary sector and there are 37 businesses in this sector. 1,086 people are employed in the tertiary sector, with 112 businesses in this sector.

As of 2000 there were 1,583 total workers who lived in the municipality. Of these, 1,294 or about 81.7% of the residents worked outside Unterentfelden while 1,160 people commuted into the municipality for work. There were a total of 1,449 jobs (of at least 6 hours per week) in the municipality.

== Religion ==
From the 2000 census, 935 or 29.3% are Roman Catholic, while 1,649 or 51.6% belonged to the Swiss Reformed Church. Of the rest of the population, there are 8 individuals (or about 0.25% of the population) who belong to the Christian Catholic faith.
