= Oberentfelden =

- Municipality
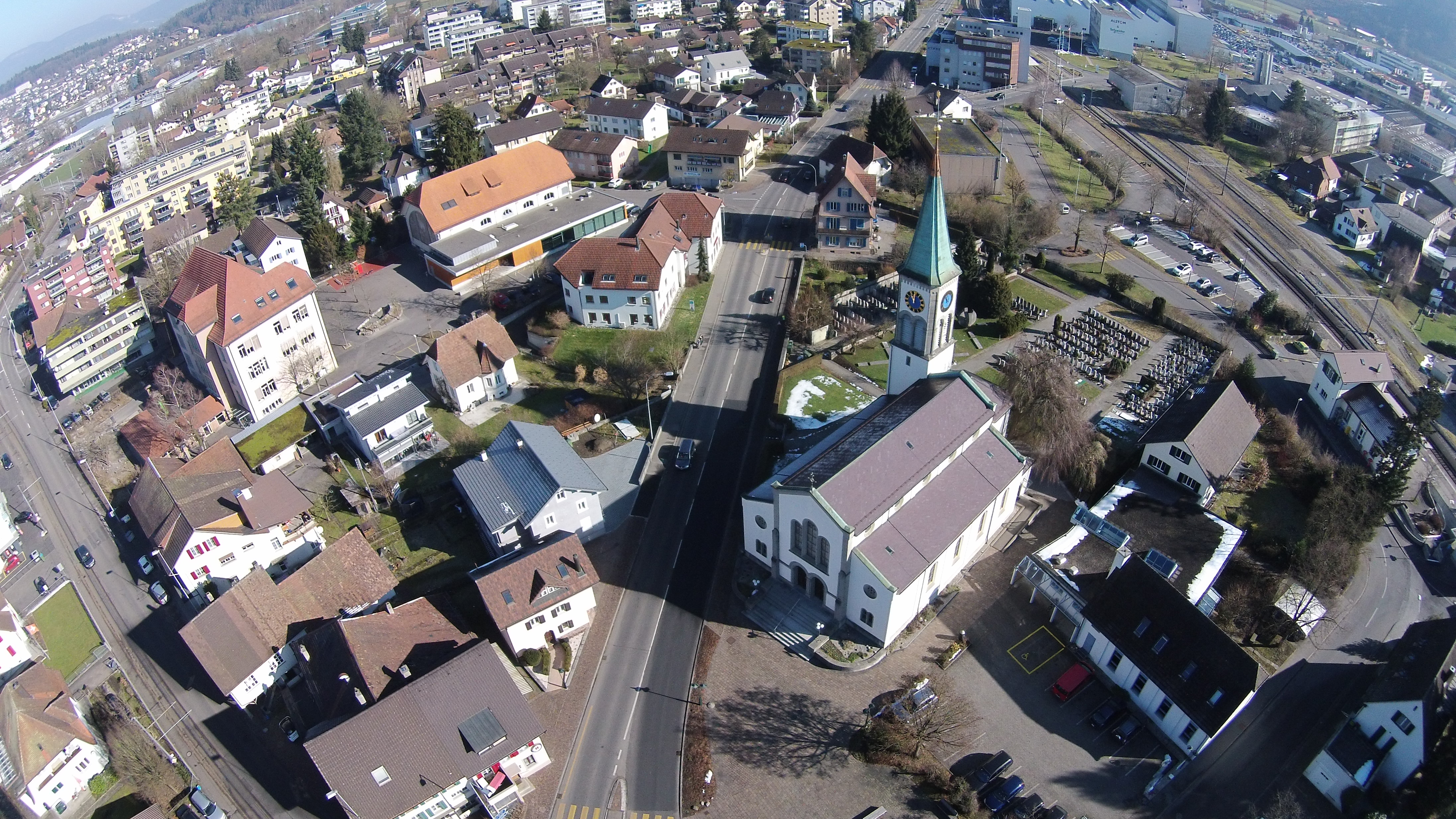

- Flag Coat of arms
- Location of Oberentfelden
- Location within Switzerland Location within Canton of Aargau
- Coordinates: 47°22′N 8°3′E
- Country: Switzerland
- Canton: Aargau
- District: Aarau

Area
  - Total: 7.16 km^{2} (2.76 sq mi)
- Elevation: 416 m (1,365 ft)

Population (December 2020)
  - Total: 8,568
  - Density: 1,200/km^{2} (3,100/sq mi)
- Time zone: UTC+01:00 (CET)
  - Summer (DST): UTC+02:00 (CEST)
- Postal code: 5036
- SFOS number: 4010
- ISO 3166 code: CH-AG
- Surrounded by: Gränichen, Gretzenbach (SO), Kölliken, Muhen, Schönenwerd (SO), Suhr, Unterentfelden
- Website: www.oberentfelden.ch

Oberentfelden is a municipality in the district of Aarau of the canton of Aargau in Switzerland.

== History ==
Oberentfelden is first mentioned in 965 as Endiveld. In 1306 it was mentioned as Oberen-En[t]velt.

== Geography ==
Aerial view (1965)

Oberentfelden has an area, as of 2006, of 7.2 km^{2} (2.8 sq mi). Of this area, 29.4% is used for agricultural purposes, while 42.3% is forested. Of the rest of the land, 28% is settled (buildings or roads) and the remainder (0.3%) is non-productive (rivers or lakes).

The municipality is located in the Aarau district in the lower Suhr valley. The villages of Oberentfelden and Unterentfelden, while distinct municipalities, have grown together.

== Coat of arms ==
The blazon of the municipal coat of arms is Gules on Base wavy per fess wavy of six Azure and Argent a Duck issuant and in chief two Mullets Or.

Because of the original name Endiveld, which sounded like Entenfeld (duck field), the duck made it into the blazon. Historians later discovered that Endiveld originates from Ende des Feldes (end of the field) and has nothing to do with a duck, so it was proposed to change the blazon. In a public votation a change was highly rejected because everyone loved the duck.

== Demographics ==
Oberentfelden has a population (as of 31 December 2020) of 8,568. As of 2008, 27.1% of the population was made up of foreign nationals. Over the last 10 years the population has grown at a rate of 7.4%. Most of the population (as of 2000) speaks German (86.0%), with Italian being second most common (3.8%) and Serbo-Croatian being third (2.2%).

The age distribution, as of 2008, in Oberentfelden is; 708 children or 9.7% of the population are between 0 and 9 years old and 896 teenagers or 12.3% are between 10 and 19. Of the adult population, 908 people or 12.4% of the population are between 20 and 29 years old. 955 people or 13.1% are between 30 and 39, 1,232 people or 16.9% are between 40 and 49, and 991 people or 13.6% are between 50 and 59. The senior population distribution is 791 people or 10.8% of the population are between 60 and 69 years old, 520 people or 7.1% are between 70 and 79, there are 248 people or 3.4% who are between 80 and 89, and there are 49 people or 0.7% who are 90 and older.

Historical population
Year	Pop.	±%
1764	600	—
1803	943	+57.2%
1850	1,379	+46.2%
1900	1,523	+10.4%
1950	2,771	+81.9%
2000	6,740	+143.2%

As of 2000, there were 289 homes with 1 or 2 persons in the household, 1,551 homes with 3 or 4 persons in the household, and 908 homes with 5 or more persons in the household. The average number of people per household was 2.32 individuals. In 2008 there were 1,024 single family homes (or 30.0% of the total) out of a total of 3,416 homes and apartments.

In the 2007 federal election the most popular party was the SVP which received 38.9% of the vote. The next three most popular parties were the SP (19.9%), the FDP (15%) and the CVP (8.3%).

In Oberentfelden about 68.6% of the population (between age 25–64) have completed either non-mandatory upper secondary education or additional higher education (either university or a Fachhochschule). Of the school age population (in the 2008/2009 school year), there are 544 students attending primary school, there are 225 students attending secondary school, there are 212 students attending tertiary or university level schooling in the municipality.

The historical population is given in the following table:

== Heritage sites of national significance ==
In the 1995 inventory, the remains of the Ancient Roman estate in Oberentfelden was listed as a heritage site of national significance. However, in the 2008 inventory the estate was no longer listed.

== Economy ==
As of 2007, Oberentfelden had an unemployment rate of 2.14%. As of 2005, there were 91 people employed in the primary economic sector and about 18 businesses involved in this sector. 1,659 people are employed in the secondary sector and there are 77 businesses in this sector. 1,511 people are employed in the tertiary sector, with 195 businesses in this sector.

As of 2000 there were 3,564 total workers who lived in the municipality. Of these, 2,640 or about 74.1% of the residents worked outside Oberentfelden while 2,103 people commuted into the municipality for work. There were a total of 3,027 jobs (of at least 6 hours per week) in the municipality.

In Oberentfelden you can find the only existing 18-hole golf course of the canton Argovia. A part of that golf site is also a hotel.

== Religion ==
From the 2000 census, 1,835 or 27.2% are Roman Catholic, while 3,368 or 50.0% belonged to the Swiss Reformed Church. Of the rest of the population, there are 10 individuals (or about 0.15% of the population) who belong to the Christian Catholic faith.
