= Muhen =

- Municipality
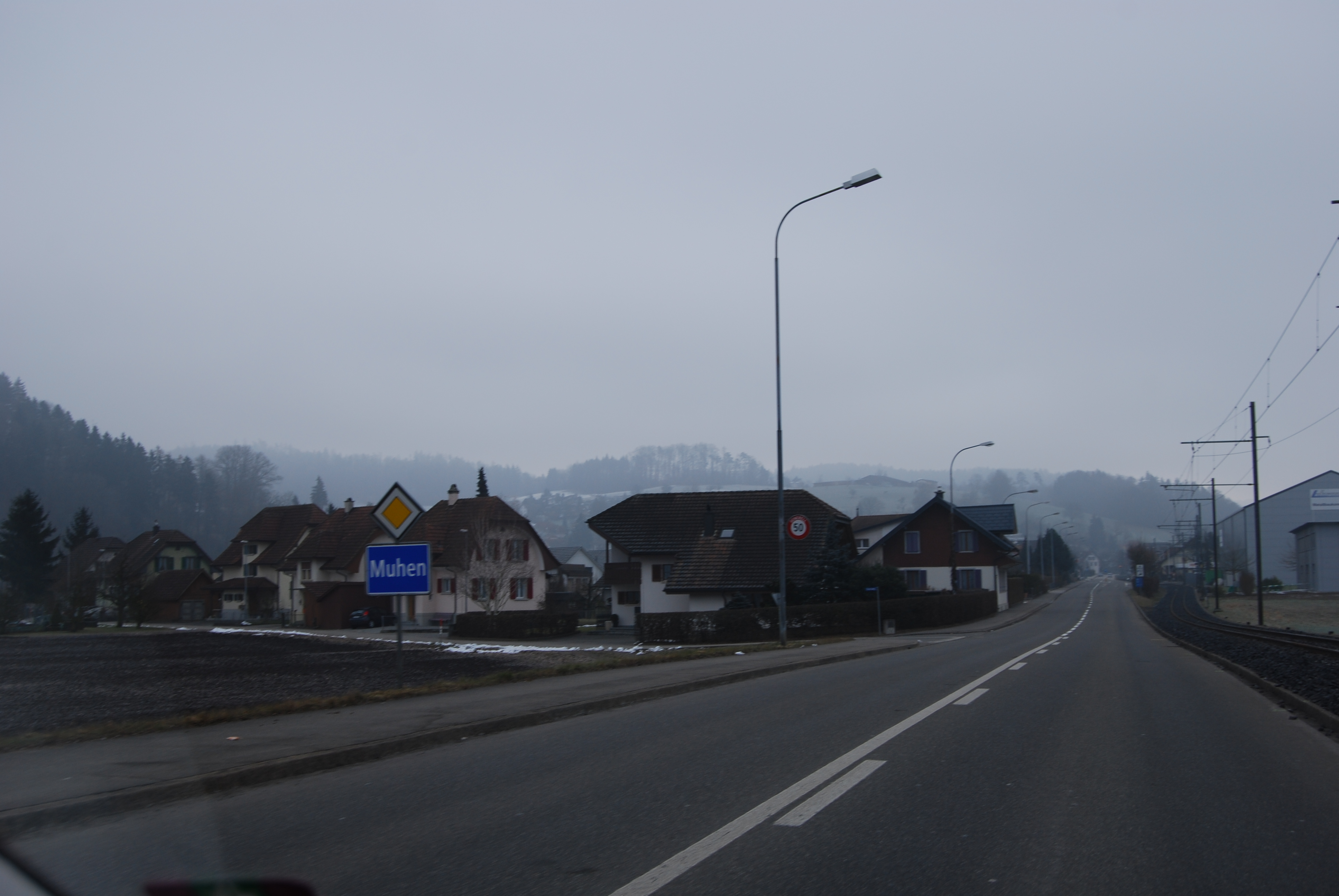

- Flag Coat of arms
- Location of Muhen
- Location within Switzerland Location within Canton of Aargau
- Coordinates: 47°20′N 8°3′E
- Country: Switzerland
- Canton: Aargau
- District: Aarau

Area
  - Total: 7.03 km^{2} (2.71 sq mi)
- Elevation: 433 m (1,421 ft)

Population (December 2020)
  - Total: 3,985
  - Density: 567/km^{2} (1,470/sq mi)
- Time zone: UTC+01:00 (CET)
  - Summer (DST): UTC+02:00 (CEST)
- Postal code: 5037
- SFOS number: 4009
- ISO 3166 code: CH-AG
- Surrounded by: Gränichen, Hirschthal, Holziken, Kölliken, Oberentfelden, Unterkulm
- Website: www.muhen.ch

Muhen is a municipality in the district of Aarau of the canton of Aargau in Switzerland.

== History ==
Muhen is first mentioned in 1045 as Mucheim, though this comes from a 14th-century copy of the original. In 1267 it was mentioned as Mukhein.

== Geography ==
Aerial view (1954)

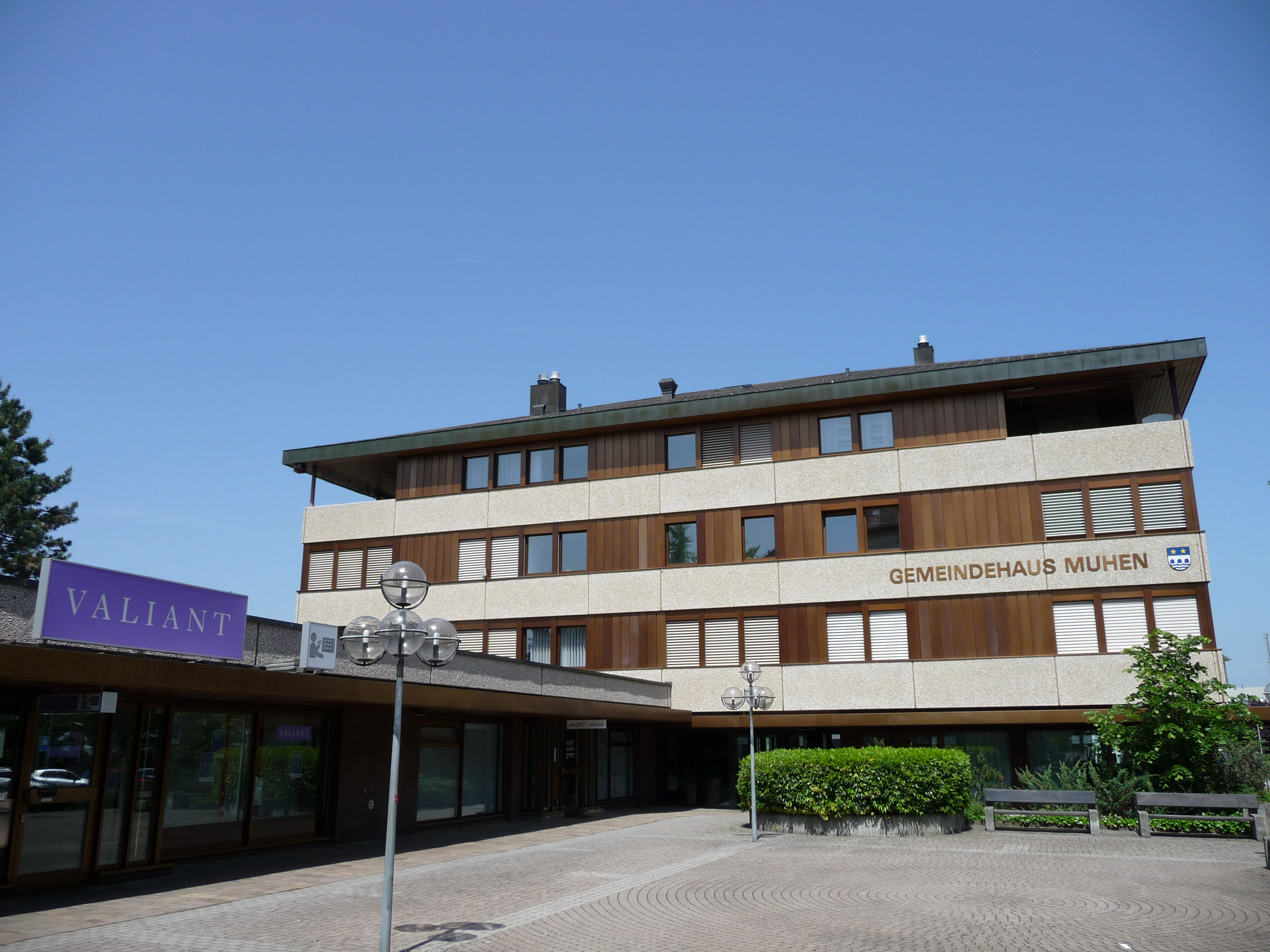
Town hall building in Muhen

Muhen has an area, as of 2006, of 7 km^{2} (2.7 sq mi). Of this area, 42.6% is used for agricultural purposes, while 42.2% is forested. Of the rest of the land, 15.1% is settled (buildings or roads) and the remainder (0.1%) is non-productive (rivers or lakes).

The municipality is located in the Aarau district in the lower Suhr valley. It consists of the formerly independent villages that have grown together; Ober-, Mittel- and Untermuhen as well as Schwabistal.

== Flag and coat of arms ==
The blazon of the municipal flag and coat of arms is Azure above a base wavy with two barrulets wavy of the first a Bridge of the second masoned and in chief two Mullets of Five Or.

== Demographics ==
Muhen has a population (as of 31 December 2020) of 3,985. As of 2008, 12.1% of the population was made up of foreign nationals. Over the last 10 years the population has grown at a rate of 12.9%. Most of the population (as of 2000) speaks German (93.5%), with Italian being second most common ( 3.1%) and French being third ( 0.7%).

The age distribution, as of 2008, in Muhen is; 335 children or 9.6% of the population are between 0 and 9 years old and 438 teenagers or 12.6% are between 10 and 19. Of the adult population, 431 people or 12.4% of the population are between 20 and 29 years old. 444 people or 12.7% are between 30 and 39, 573 people or 16.4% are between 40 and 49, and 534 people or 15.3% are between 50 and 59. The senior population distribution is 351 people or 10.1% of the population are between 60 and 69 years old, 241 people or 6.9% are between 70 and 79, there are 127 people or 3.6% who are between 80 and 89, and there are 15 people or 0.4% who are 90 and older.

As of 2000, there were 60 homes with 1 or 2 persons in the household, 522 homes with 3 or 4 persons in the household, and 557 homes with 5 or more persons in the household. The average number of people per household was 2.51 individuals. In 2008 there were 766 single family homes (or 52.9% of the total) out of a total of 1,447 homes and apartments.

In the 2007 federal election the most popular party was the SVP which received 43.5% of the vote. The next three most popular parties were the SP (16.7%), the FDP (14%) and the CVP (7.4%).

In Muhen about 75.1% of the population (between age 25-64) have completed either non-mandatory upper secondary education or additional higher education (either university or a Fachhochschule). Of the school age population (in the 2008/2009 school year), there are 222 students attending primary school, there are 115 students attending secondary school in the municipality.

The historical population is given in the following table:

Historical population
Year	Pop.	±%
1764	615	—
1803	846	+37.6%
1850	1,288	+52.2%
1900	1,213	−5.8%
1950	2,046	+68.7%
2000	3,083	+50.7%

== Heritage sites of national significance ==
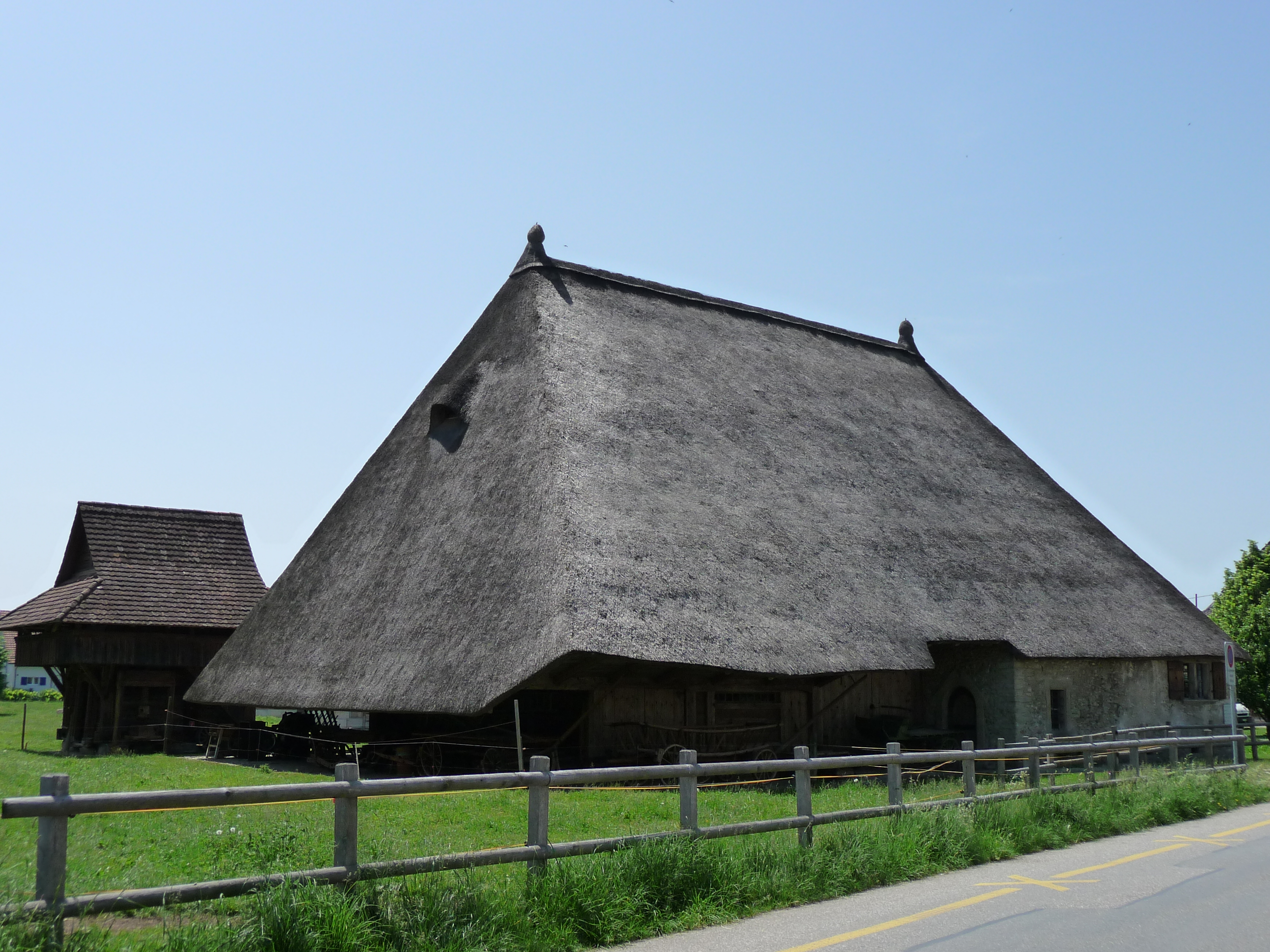
Thatched farmhouse

Its 17th-century straw-thatched farmhouse with barn was listed as a 1995 heritage site of national significance. However, the farmhouse in no longer listed in the 2008 inventory.

== Economy ==
As of 2007, Muhen had an unemployment rate of 1.15%. As of 2005, there were 96 people employed in the primary economic sector and about 31 businesses involved in this sector. 282 people are employed in the secondary sector and there are 36 businesses in this sector. 882 people are employed in the tertiary sector, with 84 businesses in this sector.

As of 2000 there were 1,556 total workers who lived in the municipality. Of these, 1,214 or about 78.0% of the residents worked outside Muhen while 418 people commuted into the municipality for work. There were a total of 760 jobs (of at least 6 hours per week) in the municipality.

== Religion ==
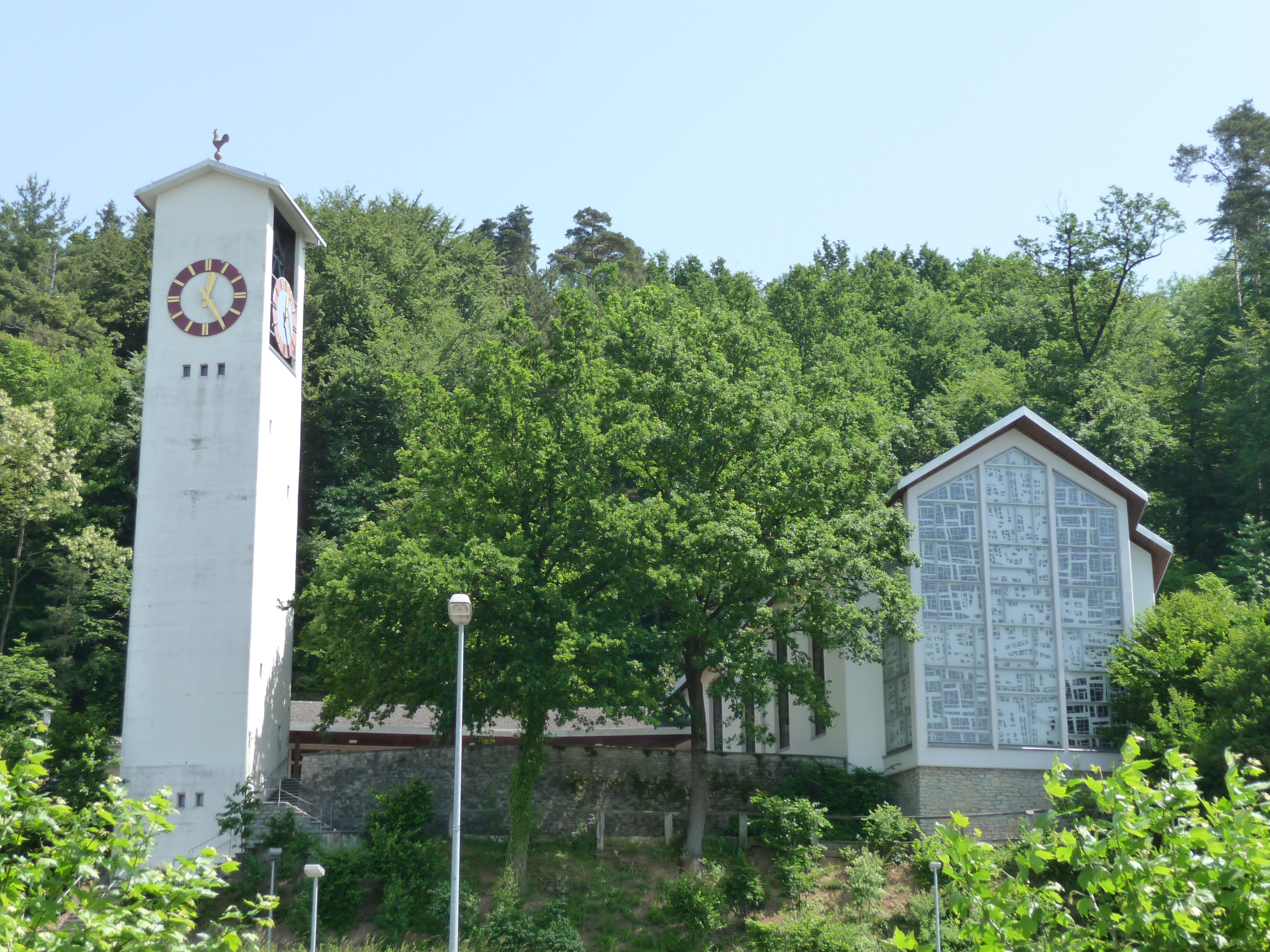
Swiss Reformed Church of Muhen

From the 2000 census, 623 or 20.2% are Roman Catholic, while 1,993 or 64.6% belonged to the Swiss Reformed Church. Of the rest of the population, there are 7 individuals (or about 0.23% of the population) who belong to the Christian Catholic faith.
