= Suhr, Aargau =

Suhr
- Municipality
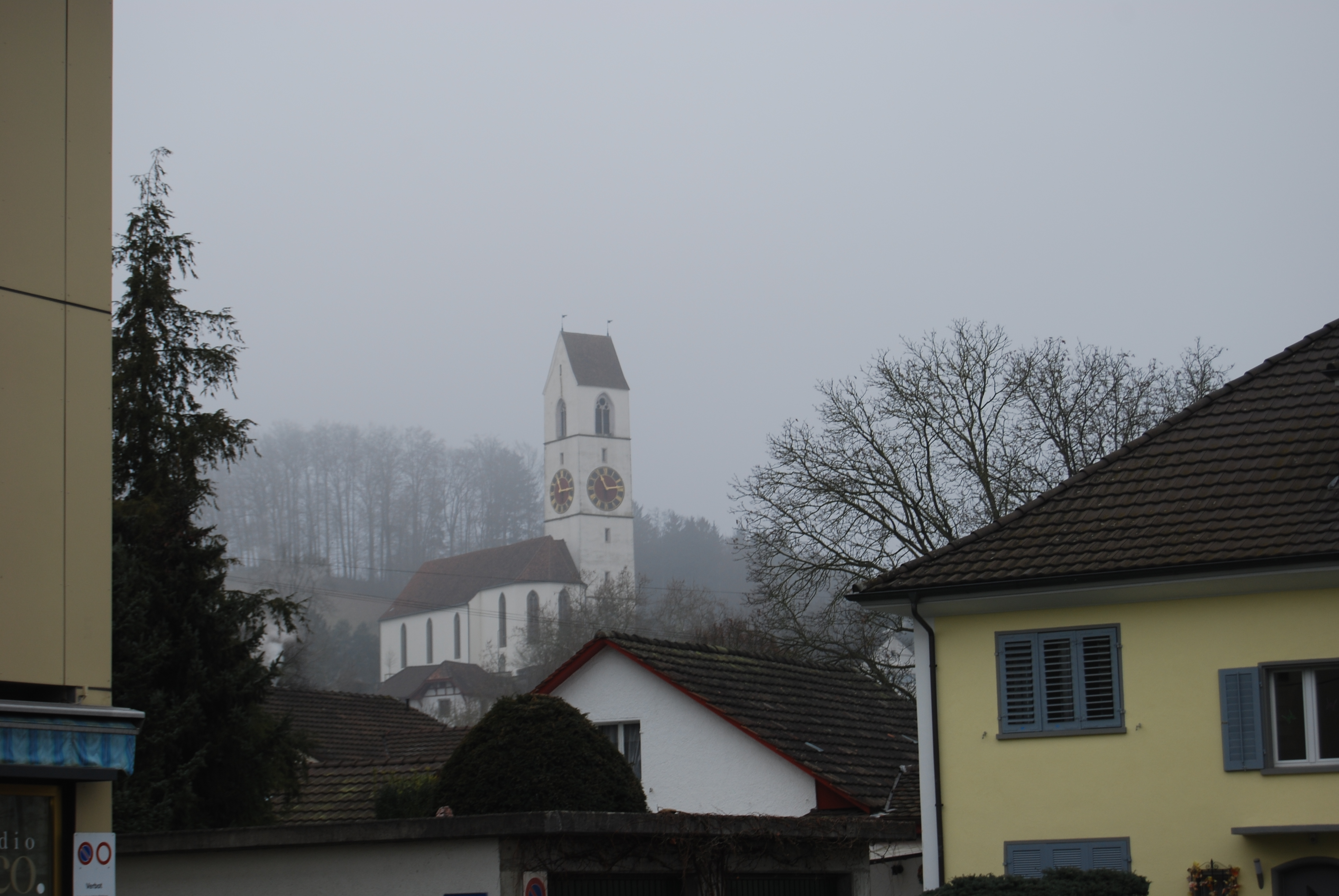

- Flag Coat of arms
- Location of Suhr
- Location within Switzerland Location within Canton of Aargau
- Coordinates: 47°22′N 8°5′E
- Country: Switzerland
- Canton: Aargau
- District: Aarau

Area
  - Total: 10.93 km^{2} (4.22 sq mi)
- Elevation: 397 m (1,302 ft)

Population (December 2020)
  - Total: 10,724
  - Density: 981.2/km^{2} (2,541/sq mi)
- Time zone: UTC+01:00 (CET)
  - Summer (DST): UTC+02:00 (CEST)
- Postal code: 5034
- SFOS number: 4012
- ISO 3166 code: CH-AG
- Surrounded by: Aarau, Buchs, Gränichen, Hunzenschwil, Oberentfelden, Rupperswil, Unterentfelden
- Twin towns: Castelnuovo Rangone (Italy)
- Website: suhr.ch

Suhr is a municipality in the district of Aarau of the canton of Aargau in Switzerland.

== Geography ==
Aerial view (1958)

Suhr has an area, as of 2006, of 10.6 km^{2} (4.1 sq mi). Of this area, 29.9% is used for agricultural purposes, while 44.4% is forested. Of the rest of the land, 25.2% is settled (buildings or roads) and the remainder (0.5%) is non-productive (rivers or lakes).

== Coat of arms ==
The blazon of the municipal coat of arms is Gules a Latin Cross pattee Argent and in Chief two Mullets of Five of the same and Coupeaux Vert.

== Demographics ==
Suhr has a population (as of 31 December 2020) of 10,724. As of 2008, 30.5% of the population was made up of foreign nationals. Over the last 10 years, the population has grown at a rate of 19.2%. Most of the population (as of 2000) speaks German (84.2%), with Italian being second most common (4.3%) and Serbo-Croatian being third (2.6%).

The age distribution, as of 2008, in Suhr is; 1,057 children or 11.1% of the population are between 0 and 9 years old and 1,099 teenagers or 11.5% are between 10 and 19. Of the adult population, 1,331 people or 13.9% of the population are between 20 and 29 years old. 1,422 people or 14.9% are between 30 and 39, 1,536 people or 16.1% are between 40 and 49, and 1,252 people or 13.1% are between 50 and 59. The senior population distribution is 847 people or 8.9% of the population are between 60 and 69 years old, 602 people or 6.3% are between 70 and 79, there are 353 people or 3.7% who are between 80 and 89, and there are 57 people or 0.6% who are 90 and older.

As of 2000, there were 491 homes with 1 or 2 persons in the household, 1,971 homes with 3 or 4 persons in the household, and 1,077 homes with 5 or more persons in the household. The average number of people per household was 2.23 individuals. In 2008, there were 1,169 single family homes (or 26.9% of the total) out of a total of 4,353 homes and apartments.

In the 2007 federal election, the most popular party was the SVP which received 31.2% of the vote. The next three most popular parties were the SP (22.1%), the FDP (12.5%) and the CVP (9%).

In Suhr, about 67.8% of the population (between age 25-64) have completed either non-mandatory upper secondary education or additional higher education (either university or a Fachhochschule). Of the school age population (in the 2008/2009 school year), there are 752 students attending primary school, there are 269 students attending secondary school, there are 214 students attending tertiary or university level schooling in the municipality.

The historical population is given in the following table:

Historical population
Year	Pop.	±%
1975	7,433	—
1980	7,096	−4.5%
1990	7,751	+9.2%
2000	8,259	+6.6%

== Transportation ==
It lies just off the A1 St. Margrethen–Geneva motorway.

== Heritage sites of national significance ==
The Catholic parish church of the Holy Ghost is listed as a Swiss heritage site of national significance.

== Sights ==
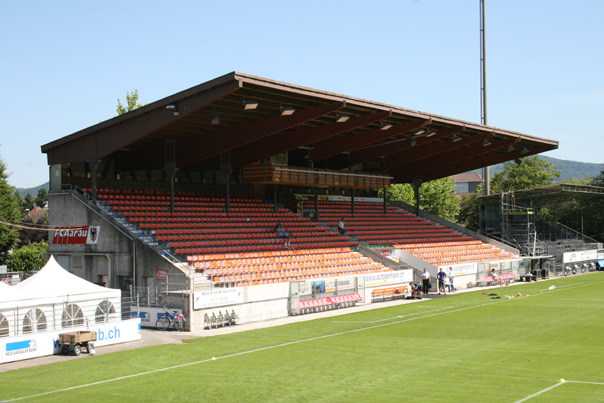
Stadion Brugglifeld

Stadion Brugglifeld, a multi-purpose stadium, is located in Suhr. It is currently used mostly for football matches and is the home stadium of FC Aarau. The current capacity is 9,249 seats and it was first used on 12 October 1924.

== Economy ==
As of 2007, Suhr had an unemployment rate of 2.98%. As of 2005, there were 65 people employed in the primary economic sector and about 18 businesses involved in this sector. 1,002 people are employed in the secondary sector and there are 57 businesses in this sector. 3,102 people are employed in the tertiary sector, with 224 businesses in this sector.

As of 2000, there were a total of 4,418 workers who lived in the municipality. Of these, 3,434 or about 77.7% of the residents worked outside suhr while 2,589 people commuted into the municipality for work. There were a total of 3,573 jobs (of at least 6 hours per week) in the municipality.

== Education ==
There used to be a location of the SIS Swiss International School in Suhr, but this has been closed in Summer 2016.

== Religion ==
From the 2000 census, 2,449 or 29.0% are Roman Catholic, while 3,774 or 44.7% belonged to the Swiss Reformed Church. Of the rest of the population, there are 16 individuals (or about 0.19% of the population) who belong to the Christian Catholic faith.

== Notable people ==
- Kurt Röthlisberger (born 1951 in Suhr) is a retired football referee, supervised five matches in the FIFA World Cup in 1990 & 1994
- Petra Volpe (born 1970 in Suhr) a Swiss screenwriter and film director
- Lunatica (formed 1998 in Suhr) a Swiss symphonic metal band
