= Schöftland =

- Municipality
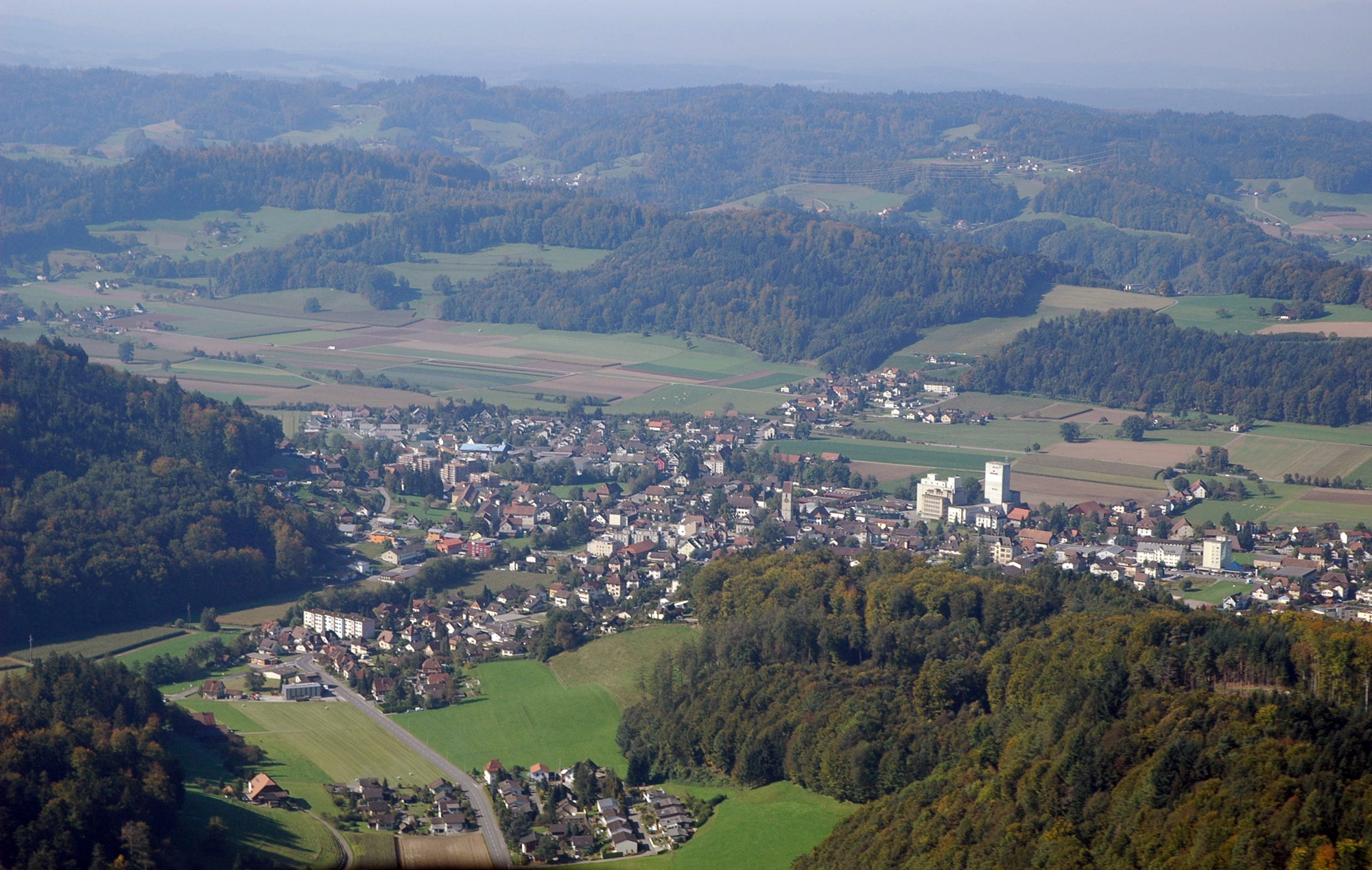

- Flag Coat of arms
- Location of Schöftland
- Location within Switzerland Location within Canton of Aargau
- Coordinates: 47°18′N 8°3′E
- Country: Switzerland
- Canton: Aargau
- District: Kulm

Area
  - Total: 6.28 km^{2} (2.42 sq mi)
- Elevation: 461 m (1,512 ft)

Population (December 2006)
  - Total: 3,440
  - Density: 548/km^{2} (1,420/sq mi)
- Time zone: UTC+01:00 (CET)
  - Summer (DST): UTC+02:00 (CEST)
- Postal code: 5040
- SFOS number: 4144
- ISO 3166 code: CH-AG
- Surrounded by: Hirschthal, Holziken, Schlossrued, Staffelbach, Uerkheim, Unterkulm
- Website: www.schoeftland.ch

Schöftland is a municipality in the district of Kulm in the canton of Aargau in Switzerland.

== Geography ==
Aerial view (1958)

Schöftland has an area, as of 2009, of 6.28 square kilometers (2.42 sq mi). Of this area, 2.21 square kilometers (0.85 sq mi) or 35.2% is used for agricultural purposes, while 2.48 square kilometers (0.96 sq mi) or 39.5% is forested. Of the rest of the land, 1.49 square kilometers (0.58 sq mi) or 23.7% is settled (buildings or roads), 0.02 km^{2} (4.9 acres) or 0.3% is either rivers or lakes.

Of the built up area, industrial buildings made up 1.4% of the total area while housing and buildings made up 12.4% and transportation infrastructure made up 4.9%. Power and water infrastructure as well as other special developed areas made up 3.2% of the area while parks, green belts and sports fields made up 1.8%. 38.7% of the total land area is heavily forested. Of the agricultural land, 18.9% is used for growing crops and 15.0% is pastures, while 1.3% is used for orchards or vine crops. All the water in the municipality is in rivers and streams.

== Coat of arms ==
The blazon of the municipal coat of arms is Or a Saltire Gules.

== Demographics ==
Schöftland has a population (as of December 2020) of 4,468 As of June 2009, 14.5% of the population are foreign nationals. Over the last 10 years (1997–2007) the population has changed at a rate of 11.4%. Most of the population (as of 2000) speaks German (89.5%), with Italian being second most common ( 3.7%) and Albanian being third ( 3.0%).

The age distribution, as of 2008, in Schöftland is; 332 children or 9.2% of the population are between 0 and 9 years old and 470 teenagers or 13.0% are between 10 and 19. Of the adult population, 430 people or 11.9% of the population are between 20 and 29 years old. 463 people or 12.8% are between 30 and 39, 592 people or 16.4% are between 40 and 49, and 482 people or 13.4% are between 50 and 59. The senior population distribution is 353 people or 9.8% of the population are between 60 and 69 years old, 273 people or 7.6% are between 70 and 79, there are 184 people or 5.1% who are between 80 and 89, and there are 31 people or 0.9% who are 90 and older.

As of 2000, there were 120 homes with 1 or 2 persons in the household, 621 homes with 3 or 4 persons in the household, and 505 homes with 5 or more persons in the household. The average number of people per household was 2.43 individuals. As of 2000, there were 1,299 private households (homes and apartments) in the municipality, and an average of 2.4 persons per household. In 2008 there were 620 single family homes (or 36.6% of the total) out of a total of 1,692 homes and apartments. There were a total of 33 empty apartments for a 2.0% vacancy rate. As of 2007, the construction rate of new housing units was 9.1 new units per 1000 residents.

Historical population
Year	Pop.	±%
1975	2,781	—
1980	2,769	−0.4%
1990	2,691	−2.8%
2000	3,219	+19.6%

In the 2007 federal election the most popular party was the SVP which received 37.5% of the vote. The next three most popular parties were the SP (17.2%), the FDP (16.2%) and the Green Party (7.5%).

In Schöftland about 69.8% of the population (between age 25-64) have completed either non-mandatory upper secondary education or additional higher education (either university or a Fachhochschule). Of the school age population (in the 2008/2009 school year), there are 228 students attending primary school, there are 166 students attending secondary school, there are 230 students attending tertiary or university level schooling in the municipality.

== Heritage sites of national significance ==
The castle at Bahnhofstrasse 5 is listed as a Swiss heritage site of national significance.

== Economy ==
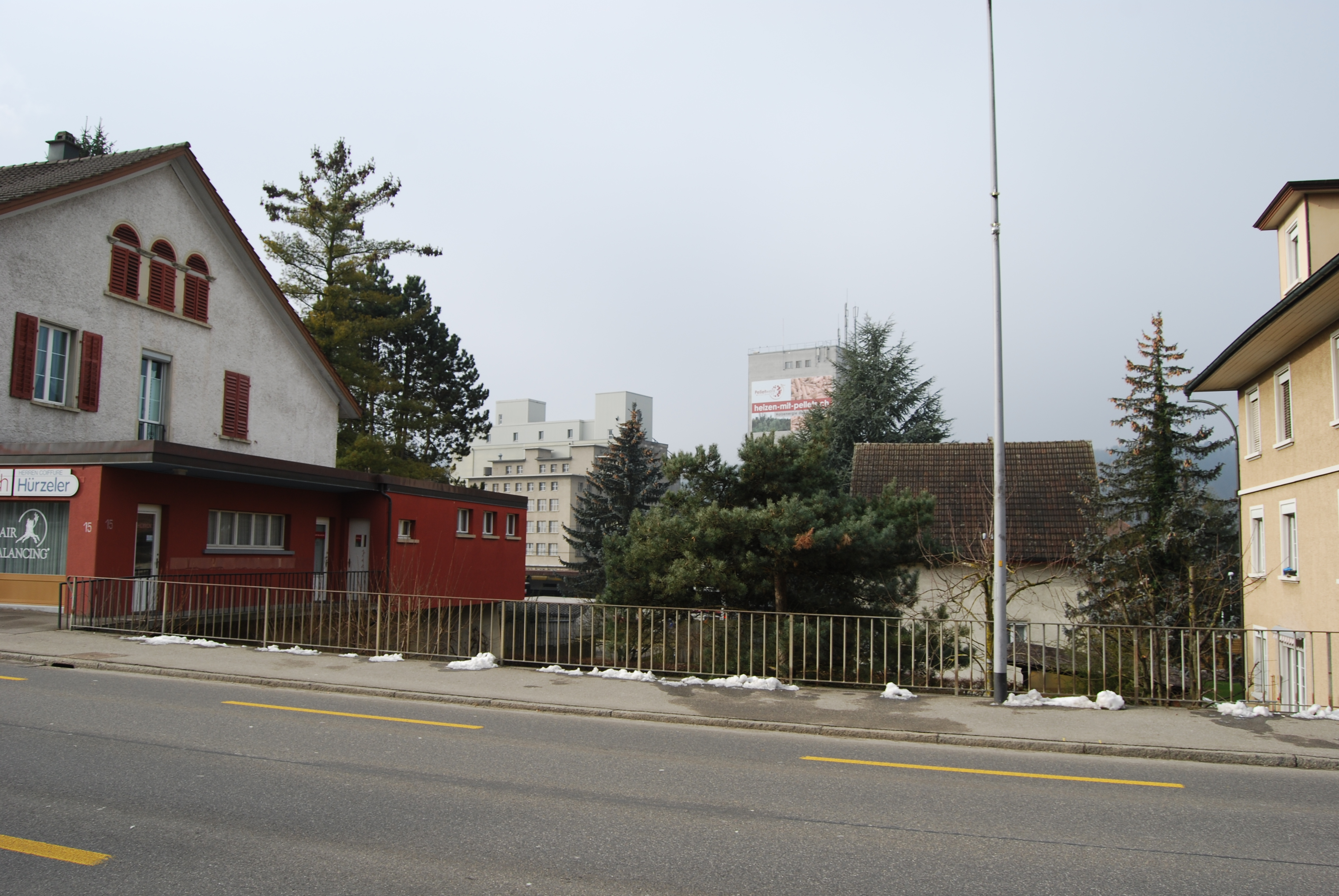
Schöftland apartments and buildings

As of 2007, Schöftland had an unemployment rate of 1.72%. As of 2005, there were 59 people employed in the primary economic sector and about 14 businesses involved in this sector. 377 people are employed in the secondary sector and there are 47 businesses in this sector. 865 people are employed in the tertiary sector, with 142 businesses in this sector.

In 2000 there were 1,613 workers who lived in the municipality. Of these, 1,132 or about 70.2% of the residents worked outside Schöftland while 792 people commuted into the municipality for work. There were a total of 1,273 jobs (of at least 6 hours per week) in the municipality. Of the working population, 13.4% used public transportation to get to work, and 52.4% used a private car.

== Transport ==
Schöftland is served by the Aarau–Schöftland railway line, operated by Aargau Verkehr, which carries service S14 of the Aargau S-Bahn. This provides a fifteen minute interval service to the cantonal capital at Aarau, and stops at Schöftland and Schöftland Nordweg stations within the municipality,

== Religion ==
From the 2000 census, 784 or 24.0% were Roman Catholic, while 1,821 or 55.7% belonged to the Swiss Reformed Church. Of the rest of the population, there were 2 individuals (or about 0.06% of the population) who belonged to the Christian Catholic faith.
