= Hirschthal =

- Municipality
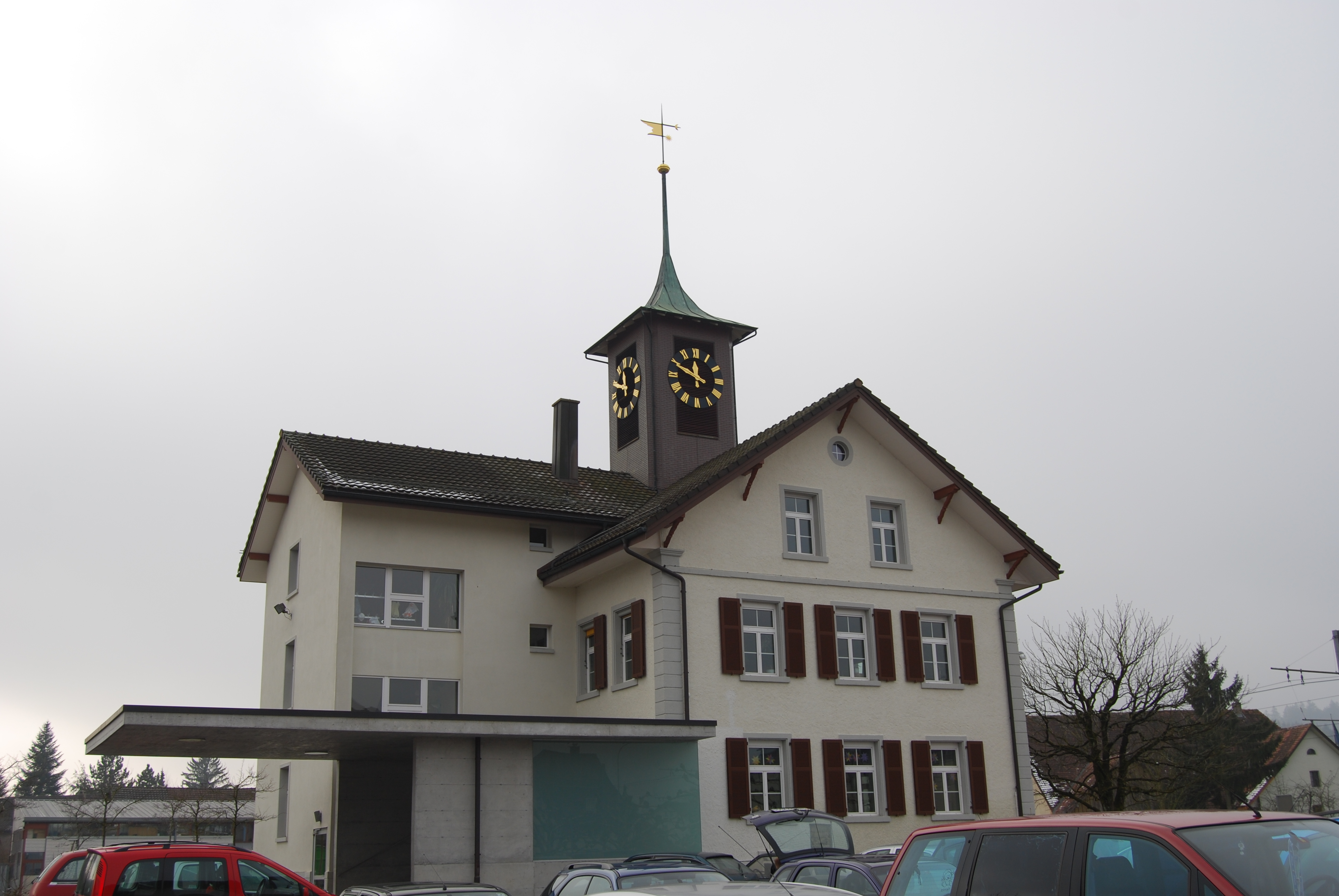

- Flag Coat of arms
- Location of Hirschthal
- Location within Switzerland Location within Canton of Aargau
- Coordinates: 47°19′N 8°3′E
- Country: Switzerland
- Canton: Aargau
- District: Aarau

Area
  - Total: 3.53 km^{2} (1.36 sq mi)
- Elevation: 442 m (1,450 ft)

Population (December 2020)
  - Total: 1,645
  - Density: 466/km^{2} (1,210/sq mi)
- Time zone: UTC+01:00 (CET)
  - Summer (DST): UTC+02:00 (CEST)
- Postal code: 5042
- SFOS number: 4007
- ISO 3166 code: CH-AG
- Surrounded by: Holziken, Muhen, Schöftland, Unterkulm
- Website: www.hirschthal.ch

Hirschthal (Swiss Standard German pronunciation: [ˈhɪrʃtaːl]) is a municipality in the district of Aarau of the canton of Aargau in Switzerland.

Aerial view (1970)

== History ==
Hirschthal is first mentioned in 924 as Hyrztale.

== Geography ==
Hirschthal has an area, as of 2006, of 3.6 km^{2} (1.4 sq mi). Of this area, 34.1% is used for agricultural purposes, while 51.5% is forested. Of the rest of the land, 14.1% is settled (buildings or roads) and the remainder (0.3%) is non-productive (rivers or lakes).

The municipality is located in the Aarau district in the mid-Suhr valley.

== Coat of arms ==
The blazon of the municipal coat of arms is Argent on a Base Vert a Deer salient Gules.

== Demographics ==
Hirschthal has a population (as of 31 December 2020) of 1,645. As of 2008, 8.9% of the population was made up of foreign nationals. Over the last 10 years the population has grown at a rate of 20.2%. Most of the population (as of 2000) speaks German (94.0%), with Italian being second most common ( 1.7%) and Albanian being third ( 0.8%).

The age distribution, as of 2008, in Hirschthal is; 164 children or 11.5% of the population are between 0 and 9 years old and 171 teenagers or 12.0% are between 10 and 19. Of the adult population, 165 people or 11.5% of the population are between 20 and 29 years old. 202 people or 14.1% are between 30 and 39, 257 people or 18.0% are between 40 and 49, and 189 people or 13.2% are between 50 and 59. The senior population distribution is 156 people or 10.9% of the population are between 60 and 69 years old, 75 people or 5.2% are between 70 and 79, there are 48 people or 3.4% who are between 80 and 89, and there are 2 people who are 90 and older.

As of 2000, there were 27 homes with 1 or 2 persons in the household, 194 homes with 3 or 4 persons in the household, and 229 homes with 5 or more persons in the household. The average number of people per household was 2.44 individuals. In 2008 there were 321 single family homes (or 55.4% of the total) out of a total of 579 homes and apartments.

In the 2007 federal election the most popular party was the SVP which received 45.2% of the vote. The next three most popular parties were the SP (16.4%), the FDP (15.9%) and the CVP (5.7%).

The entire Swiss population is generally well educated. In Hirschthal about 76.2% of the population (between age 25-64) have completed either non-mandatory upper secondary education or additional higher education (either university or a Fachhochschule). Of the school age population (in the 2008/2009 school year), there are 111 students attending primary school in the municipality.

The historical population is given in the following table:

Historical population
Year	Pop.	±%
1764	219	—
1850	581	+165.3%
1900	522	−10.2%
1950	684	+31.0%
2000	1,177	+72.1%

== Economy ==
As of 2007, Hirschthal had an unemployment rate of 1.65%. As of 2005, there were 60 people employed in the primary economic sector and about 12 businesses involved in this sector. 168 people are employed in the secondary sector and there are 12 businesses in this sector. 293 people are employed in the tertiary sector, with 24 businesses in this sector.

As of 2000 there were 639 total workers who lived in the municipality. Of these, 525 or about 82.2% of the residents worked outside Hirschthal while 297 people commuted into the municipality for work. There were a total of 411 jobs (of at least 6 hours per week) in the municipality.

== Religion ==
From the 2000 census, 268 or 22.8% are Roman Catholic, while 714 or 60.7% belonged to the Swiss Reformed Church. Of the rest of the population, there are 4 individuals (or about 0.34% of the population) who belong to the Christian Catholic faith.
