= Samuel Amsler =

Swiss engraver (1791–1849)

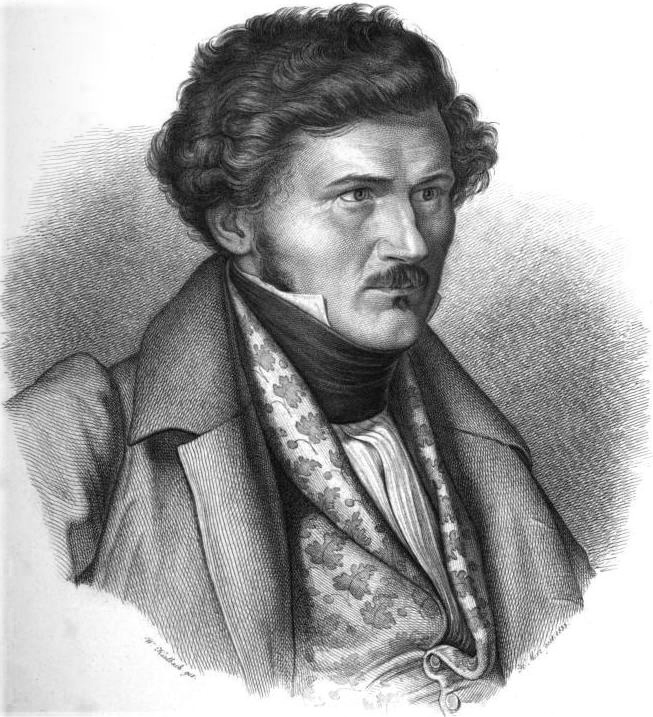
Samuel Amsler

Samuel Amsler (17 December 1791 - 18 May 1849), a Swiss engraver, was born at Schinznach, in the canton of Aargau. He studied his art under Johann Heinrich Lips (1758–1817) and Carl Ernst Christoph Hess, at Munich, and from 1816 pursued it in Italy, and chiefly at Rome. In 1829, he succeeded his former master Hess as professor of engraving in the Munich academy. The works he designed and engraved are remarkable for the grace of the figures, and for the wonderful skill with which he retains and expresses the characteristics of the original paintings and statues. He was a passionate admirer of Raphael, and had great success in reproducing his works. Amsler's principal engravings are: The Triumphal March of Alexander the Great, and a full-length Christ, after the sculptures of Thorwaldsen and Dannecker; the Entombment of Christ, and two Madonnas after Raphael; and the Union between Religion and the Arts, after Overbeck, his last work, on which he spent six years. His portrait album, now in the Ashmolean Museum, Oxford, includes a fine head of the poet Friedrich Rückert.(1) A family portrait of Amsler by Wilhelm von Kaulbach is now in the Victoria and Albert Museum, London.(2)The portrait on the right is also by von Kaulbach (1833).

== Notes ==
(1) Colin J. Bailey, 'Samuel Amsler's Portrait Album', in The Burlington Magazine CXXXIII, No. 1062, September 1990, pp. 647-667, with many illustrations. (2) The portrait album and the family portrait were presented by descendants of the artist.
