= Veltheim, Aargau =

Veltheim
- Municipality
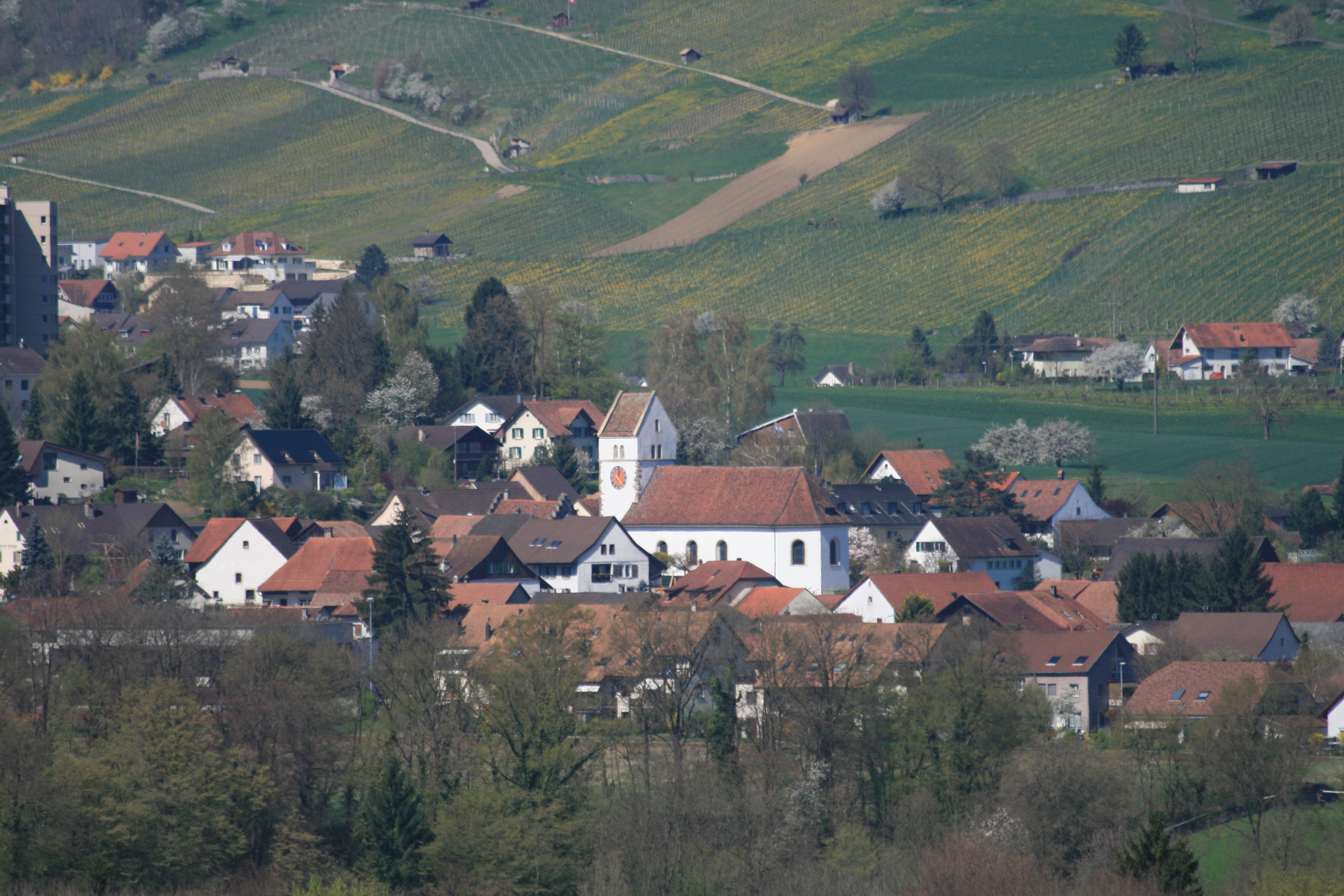

- Flag Coat of arms
- Location of Veltheim
- Location within Switzerland Location within Canton of Aargau
- Coordinates: 47°26′N 8°9′E
- Country: Switzerland
- Canton: Aargau
- District: Brugg

Area
  - Total: 5.24 km^{2} (2.02 sq mi)
- Elevation: 374 m (1,227 ft)

Population (December 2020)
  - Total: 1,526
  - Density: 291/km^{2} (754/sq mi)
- Time zone: UTC+01:00 (CET)
  - Summer (DST): UTC+02:00 (CEST)
- Postal code: 5106
- SFOS number: 4120
- ISO 3166 code: CH-AG
- Surrounded by: Auenstein, Holderbank, Möriken-Wildegg, Oberflachs, Schinznach-Dorf
- Website: www.veltheim.ch

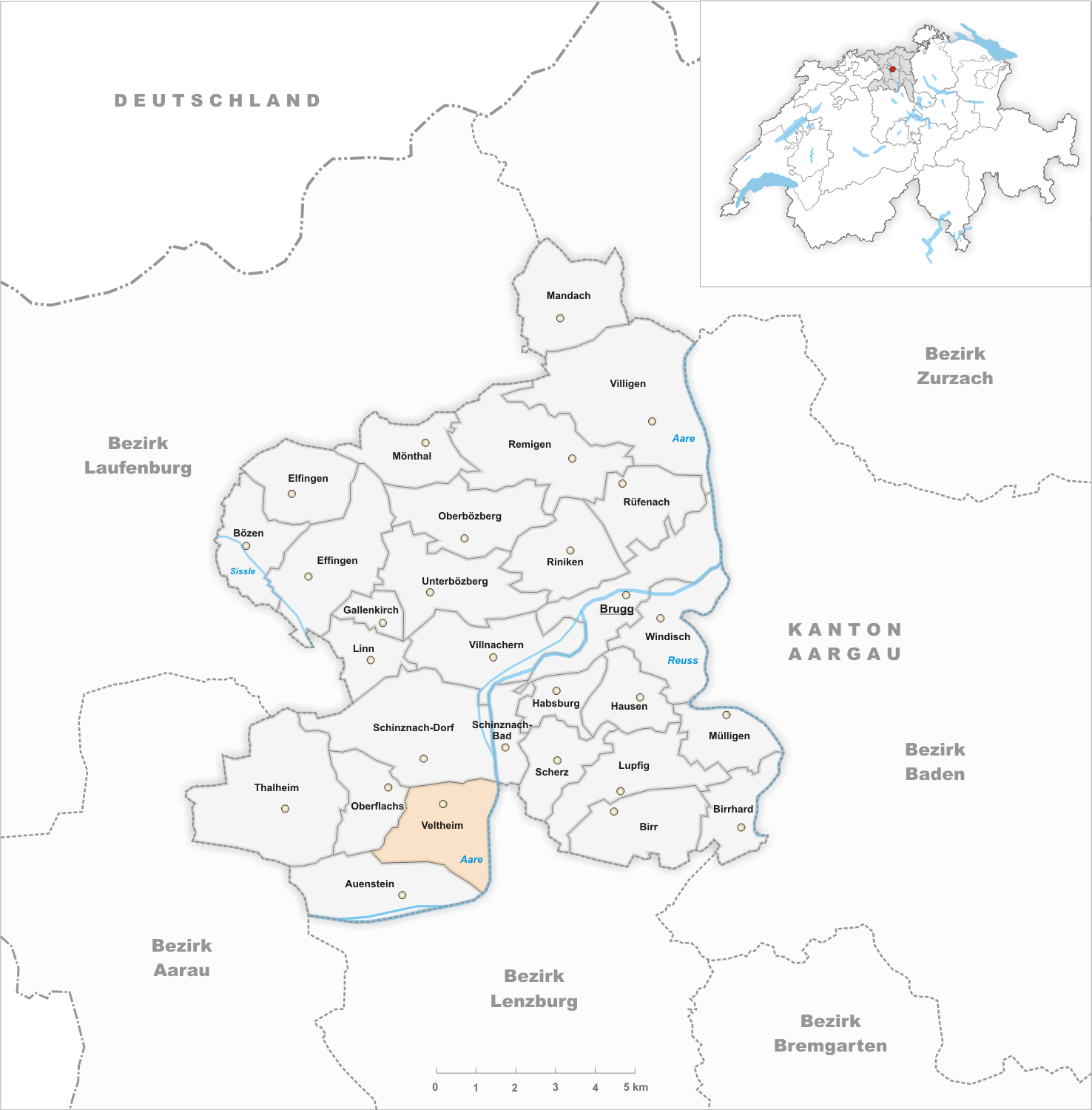
Veltheim

Veltheim (German pronunciation: [ˈfɛlthaɪm]) is a municipality in the district of Brugg in the canton of Aargau in Switzerland.

== Geography ==
Aerial view (1965)

Veltheim has an area, as of 2009, of 5.24 square kilometers (2.02 sq mi). Of this area, 2.49 square kilometers (0.96 sq mi) or 47.5% is used for agricultural purposes, while 1.69 square kilometers (0.65 sq mi) or 32.3% is forested. Of the rest of the land, 0.81 square kilometers (0.31 sq mi) or 15.5% is settled (buildings or roads), 0.18 square kilometers (0.069 sq mi) or 3.4% is either rivers or lakes and 0.03 km^{2} (7.4 acres) or 0.6% is unproductive land.

Of the built up area, industrial buildings made up 2.3% of the total area while housing and buildings made up 6.5% and transportation infrastructure made up 4.2%. Power and water infrastructure as well as other special developed areas made up 1.9% of the area 30.9% of the total land area is heavily forested and 1.3% is covered with orchards or small clusters of trees. Of the agricultural land, 26.1% is used for growing crops and 18.3% is pastures, while 3.1% is used for orchards or vine crops. All the water in the municipality is in rivers and streams.

== Coat of arms ==
The blazon of the municipal coat of arms is Azure on a Mount Vert a Rooster hardi crowing Argent crested and jelloped Gules and membered Or and in Chief a Mullet of the third.

== Demographics ==
Veltheim has a population (as of December 2020) of 1,526 As of June 2009, 15.1% of the population are foreign nationals. Over the last 10 years (1997–2007) the population has changed at a rate of 2.4%. Most of the population (as of 2000) speaks German (91.0%), with Italian being second most common ( 2.4%) and Serbo-Croatian being third ( 1.6%).

The age distribution, as of 2008, in Veltheim is; 130 children or 9.3% of the population are between 0 and 9 years old and 204 teenagers or 14.6% are between 10 and 19. Of the adult population, 171 people or 12.2% of the population are between 20 and 29 years old. 141 people or 10.1% are between 30 and 39, 289 people or 20.7% are between 40 and 49, and 209 people or 15.0% are between 50 and 59. The senior population distribution is 132 people or 9.5% of the population are between 60 and 69 years old, 75 people or 5.4% are between 70 and 79, there are 42 people or 3.0% who are between 80 and 89, and there are 3 people or 0.2% who are 90 and older.

As of 2000, there were 37 homes with 1 or 2 persons in the household, 198 homes with 3 or 4 persons in the household, and 231 homes with 5 or more persons in the household. The average number of people per household was 2.69 individuals. As of 2000, there were 495 private households (homes and apartments) in the municipality, and an average of 2.7 persons per household. In 2008 there were 276 single family homes (or 49.7% of the total) out of a total of 555 homes and apartments. There were a total of 2 empty apartments for a 0.4% vacancy rate. As of 2007, the construction rate of new housing units was 5 new units per 1000 residents.

In the 2007 federal election the most popular party was the SVP which received 38.5% of the vote. The next three most popular parties were the SP (21.1%), the FDP (8.8%) and the Green Party (8.7%).

In Veltheim about 78.4% of the population (between age 25–64) have completed either non-mandatory upper secondary education or additional higher education (either a university or a Fachhochschule). Of the school age population (in the 2008/2009 school year), there are 98 students attending primary school, there are 209 students attending secondary school in the municipality.

The historical population is given in the following table:

Historical population
Year	Pop.	±%
1975	1,044	—
1980	1,014	−2.9%
1990	1,219	+20.2%
2000	1,379	+13.1%

== Sights ==
The village of Veltheim is designated as part of the Inventory of Swiss Heritage Sites.

== Economy ==
As of 2007, Veltheim had an unemployment rate of 1.81%. As of 2005, there were 42 people employed in the primary economic sector and about 17 businesses involved in this sector. 254 people are employed in the secondary sector and there are 15 businesses in this sector. 264 people are employed in the tertiary sector, with 26 businesses in this sector.

As of 2000 there was a total of 728 workers who lived in the municipality. Of these, 595 or about 81.7% of the residents worked outside Veltheim while 247 people commuted into the municipality for work. There were a total of 380 jobs (of at least 6 hours per week) in the municipality. Of the working population, 11% used public transportation to get to work, and 56.1% used a private car.

== Religion ==
From the 2000 census, 343 or 25.4% were Roman Catholic, while 742 or 55.0% belonged to the Swiss Reformed Church. Of the rest of the population, there were 2 individuals (or about 0.15% of the population) who belonged to the Christian Catholic faith.
