= Schinznach =

- Municipality
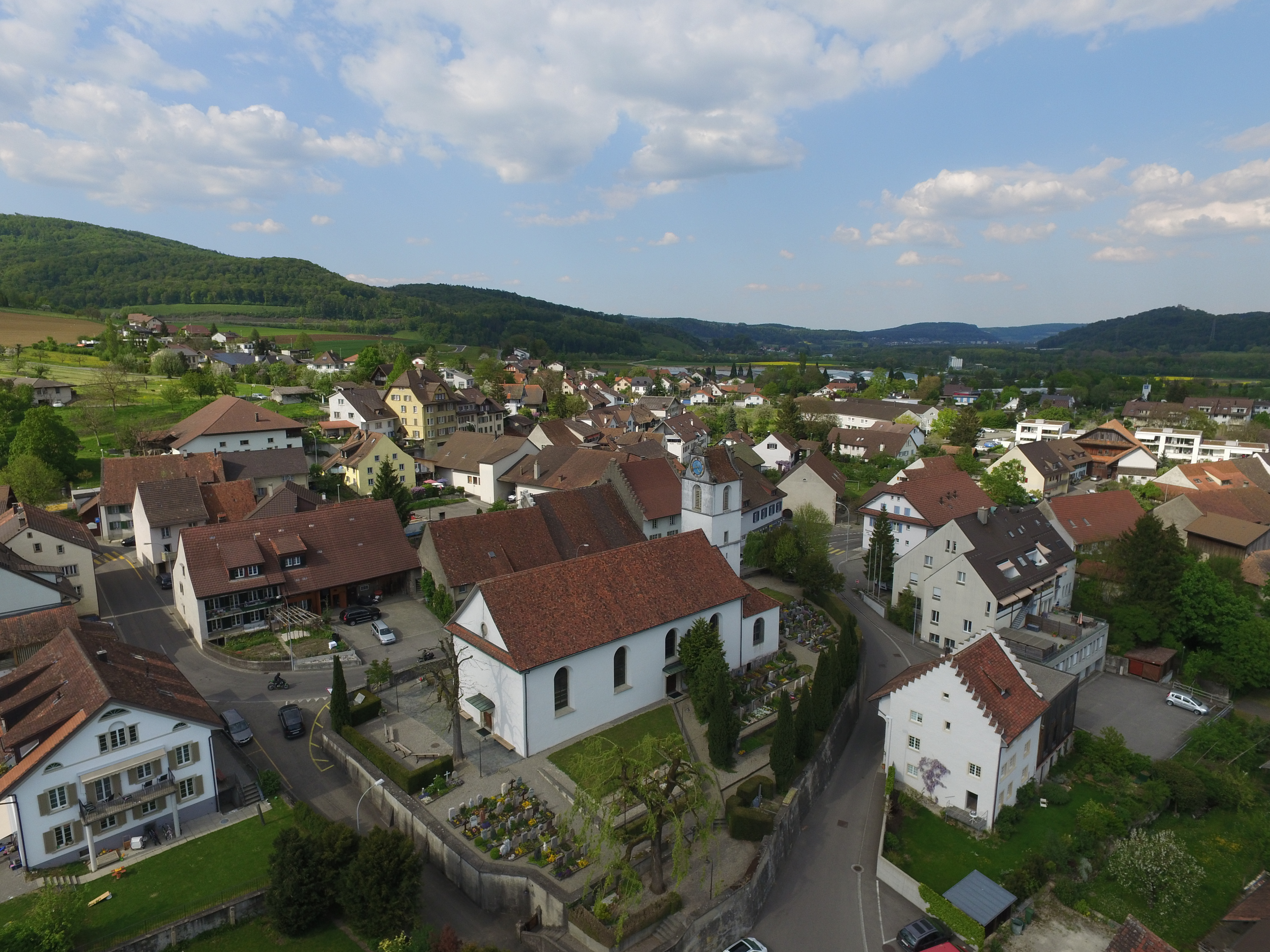

- Flag Coat of arms
- Location of Schinznach
- Location within Switzerland Location within Canton of Aargau
- Coordinates: 47°27′N 8°9′E
- Country: Switzerland
- Canton: Aargau
- District: Brugg

Area
  - Total: 12.23 km^{2} (4.72 sq mi)
- Elevation: 383 m (1,257 ft)

Population (December 2012)
  - Total: 2,239
  - Density: 183.1/km^{2} (474.2/sq mi)
- Time zone: UTC+01:00 (CET)
  - Summer (DST): UTC+02:00 (CEST)
- Postal code: 5107-08
- SFOS number: 4125
- ISO 3166 code: CH-AG
- Surrounded by: Holderbank, Linn, Oberflachs, Schinznach-Bad, Thalheim, Veltheim, Villnachern, Zeihen
- Website: www.schinznach-dorf.ch

Schinznach is a municipality in the district of Brugg in canton of Aargau in Switzerland. On 1 January 2014, the former municipalities of Oberflachs and Schinznach-Dorf merged to form the new municipality of Schinznach.

== History ==
=== Oberflachs ===
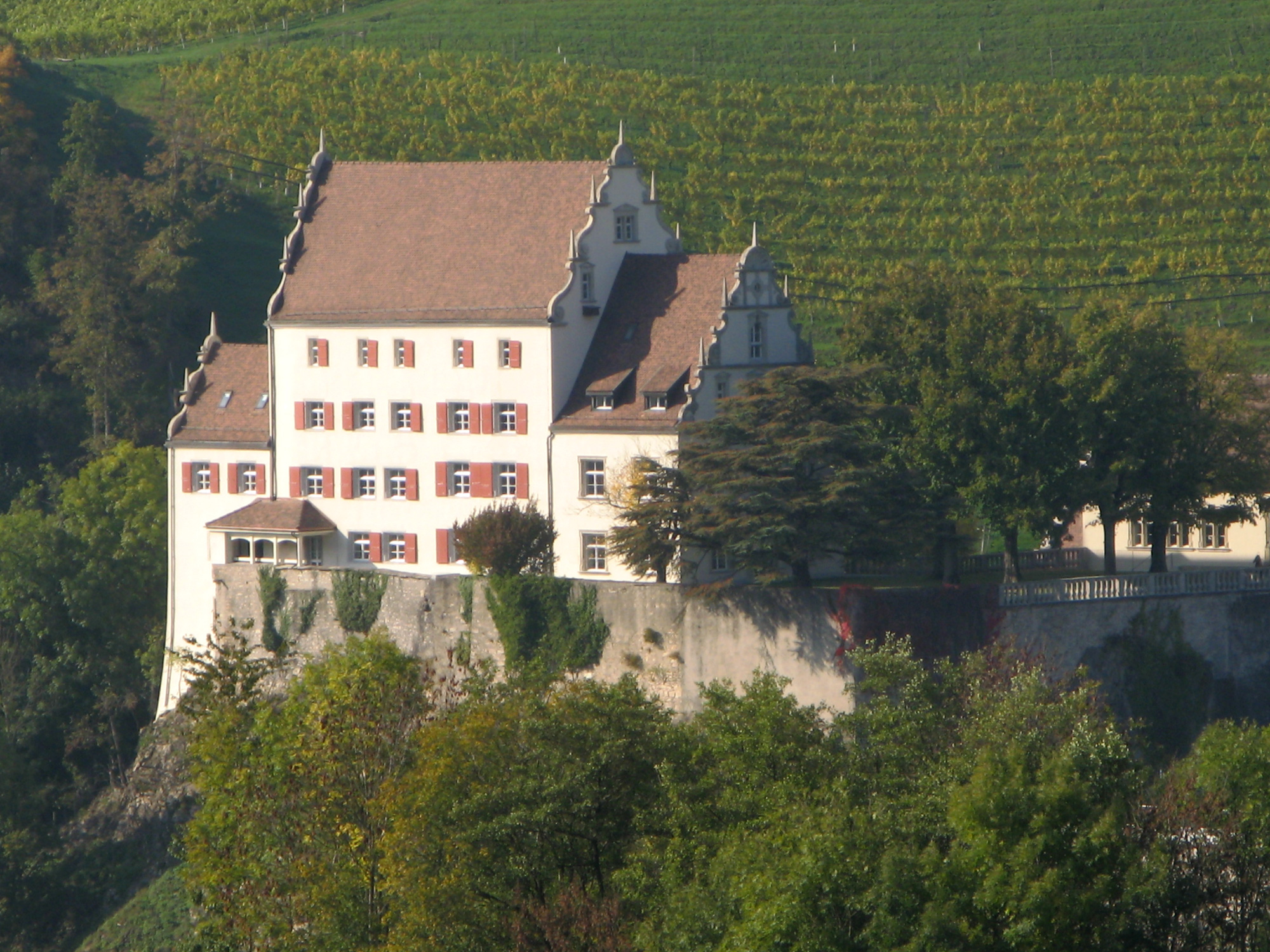
Kasteln Castle

While various Roman era bricks and coins have been discovered, the first record of Oberflachs is in 1342 as Obreflaht. Beginning in the Middle Ages Kasteln Castle ruled over the village and held the local low court. Initially the high court was held by the bailiwick of Schenkenberg. However, in 1460, the high court was acquired by the city of Bern. By 1607, the village is identified as a semi-independent municipality. In 1732, the village came fully under Bern's authority when Bern bought the Kasteln Castle and acquired the low court.

Oberflachs was, like the whole Schenkenberger valley in the 18th century, a very poor municipality. Grain and vineyard cultivation were the major economic sources in the 17th century. However, in 1850, wine production collapsed because of phylloxera. The poverty and collapse of the wine industry forced many residents to emigrate overseas. Eventually, treatments were developed for vineyards and they began to recover. By 1990, vineyards covered a total of 22 hectares in the municipality.

In 1960, the number of commuters exceeded the number of locals that worked in the municipality. However, the population continued to grow and in the 1970s several new housing districts were built. In 2005, agriculture provided 28% of the jobs in the community. A merger of Oberflachs with four municipalities failed in 2009 because Veltheim voters rejected the proposal.

=== Schinznach-Dorf ===
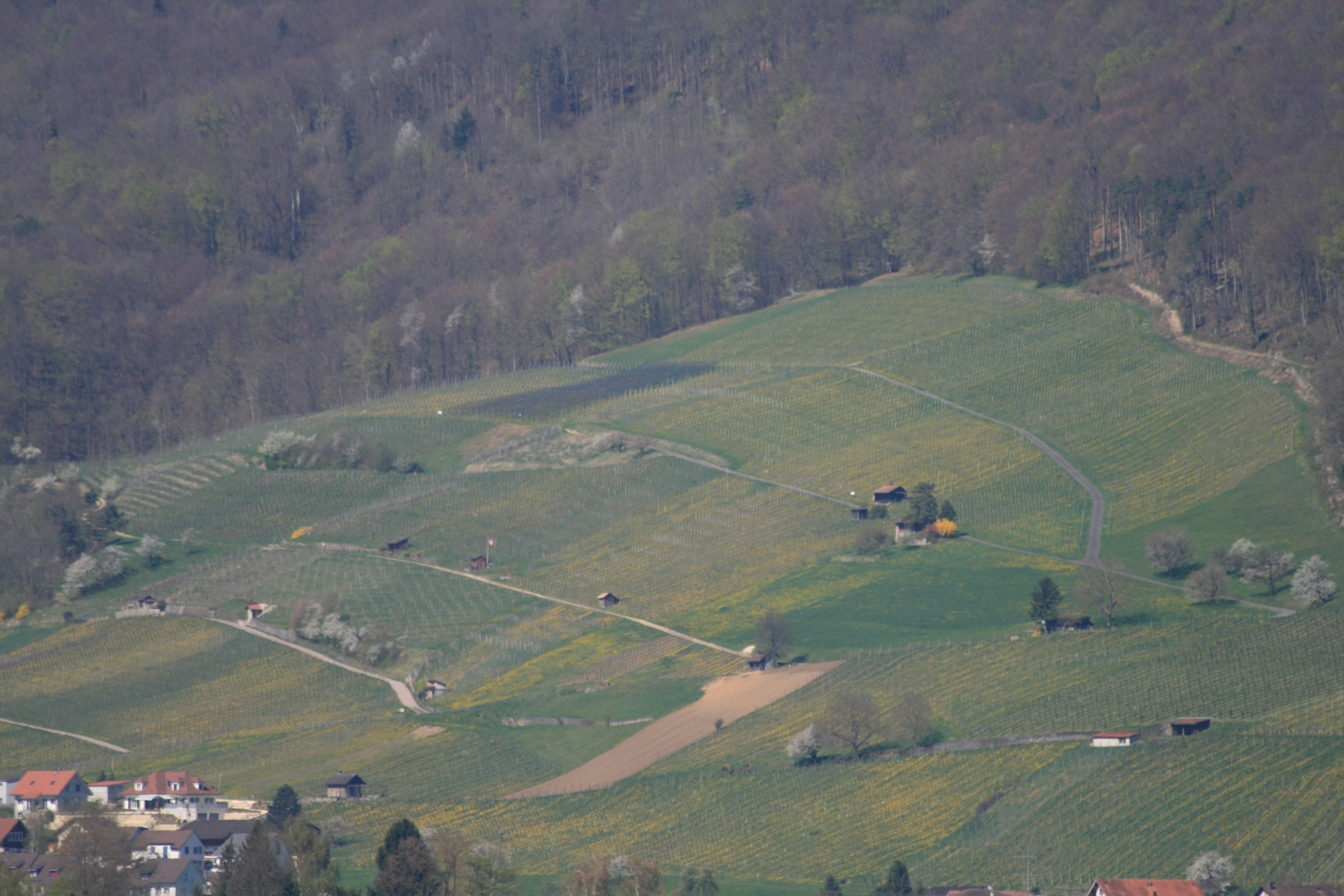
Vineyards outside Schinznach-Dorf

Aerial view from 300 m by Walter Mittelholzer (1923)

Schinznach-Dorf was first mentioned in 1189 as Schincennach, however, the region was occasionally inhabited as far back as the Mesolithic era. In addition to a Mesolithic shelter, a Neolithic settlement and two Roman villas indicate that the area was anciently inhabited. The city of Bern gained the rights to the low court in the village in 1460. Politically, the villagers gradually gained rights from their Zwingherr, and by 1547 they had a town charter. A village school opened in the 1600s. In 1654, a sulfur hot spring was discovered near the village and the town of Schinznach-Bad grew up around the spring. It retained the name even after the spring vanished in 1670 and then moved to the opposite side of the Aare river in 1691.

The local economy depended on the vineyards. When production deceased due to diseases in the 1870s many residents were forced to emigrate. Today, vineyards cover about 31 hectares, compared to 81 hectares in 1857. In 1875, a railway station was built in the village. However, the line did not do well and the station was closed in 1993. In the 1960s, the population increased and several new housing developments opened in the village.

The village church of Saint George was first mentioned in 1227. In 1650, a funeral chapel for the wealthy von Erlach family was built next to the church. The old church building was replaced with a new one in 1779.

== Geography ==
The former municipalities that now make up Schinznach have a total combined area of 12.24 km^{2} (4.73 sq mi).

== Demographics ==
The total population of Schinznach (as of December 2020) is 2,319.

== Historic population ==
The historical population is given in the following chart:

== Heritage sites of national significance ==
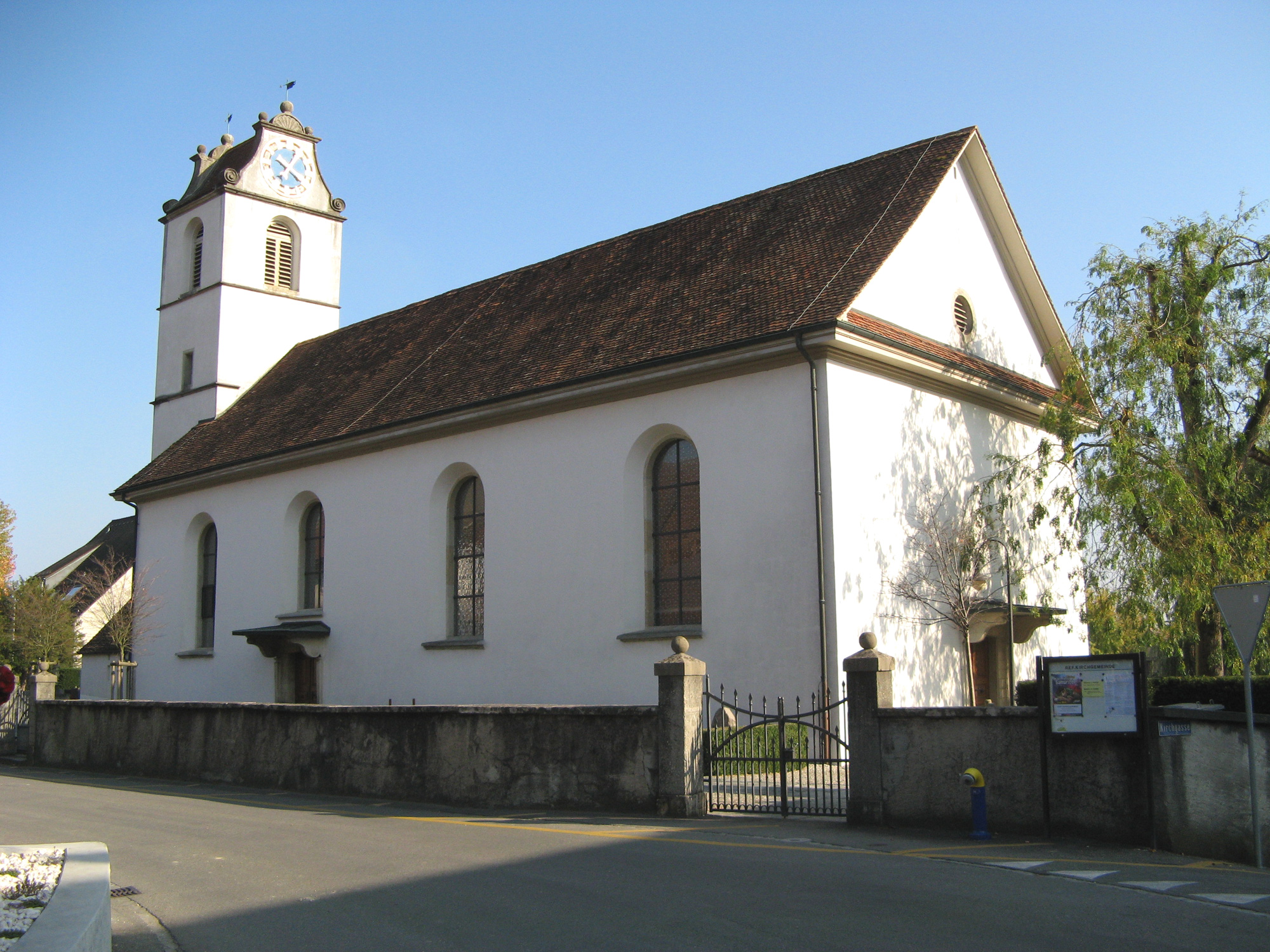
Schinznach village church

The Reformed Church and Erlach Chapel is listed as a Swiss heritage site of national significance.

The villages of Schinznach-Dorf and Oberflachs are designated as part of the Inventory of Swiss Heritage Sites.
