= Johann Ludwig von Erlach =

Swiss mercenary (1595–1650)

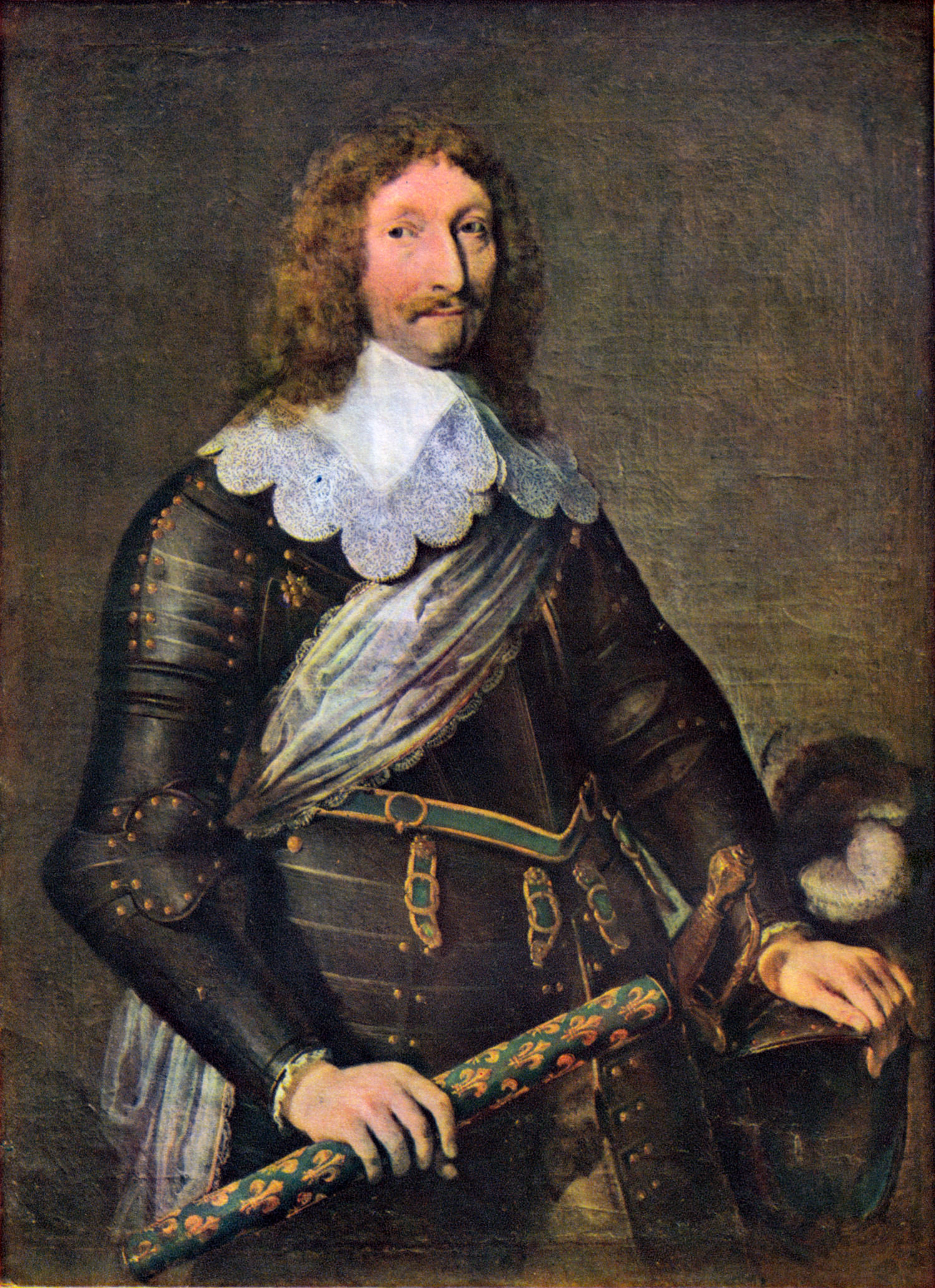
Anonymous portrait, c. 1650

Johann Ludwig von Erlach (30 October 1595 – 26 January 1650) was a Swiss mercenary and military commander of the Thirty Years' War.

== Biography ==
Erlach was born on 30 October 1595 in Bern, canton of Bern, into the Bernese patrician Erlach family. He was the son of Colonel Rudolf von Erlach, Landvogt of Morges, and Katharina von Mülinen. Erlach studied in Geneva from 1608 to 1611 and was a page at the court of Christian I, Prince of Anhalt-Bernburg, from 1611 to 1616. He began his career as a mercenary early in the Thirty Years' War, as an officer in the service of Anhalt, Brandenburg and Brunswick between 1618 and 1625; he was taken prisoner in 1620 and wounded in battle several times.

In 1625, Erlach fought for King Gustavus Adolphus of Sweden in the Polish–Swedish War (1621–1625) as a colonel and quartermaster general. Returning in Bern, he entered the Grand Council in 1627 and the Small Council in 1629, and was responsible for the 1628 reform of the Bernese army. Erlach then entered French service and led his regiment in the Siege of Casale, during the War of the Mantuan Succession. In 1632 and from 1635 onwards, Erlach served in the army of the Duke Bernard of Saxe-Weimar. In the meantime, in 1633, he had commanded Bernese troops in Aargau and acquired the lordship and castle of Kasteln, which he rebuilt. Erlach would also acquire the lordship of Auestein in 1644.

As the Duke of Saxe-Weimar's chief of staff, Erlach organized the Rhine campaign of 1638 that led to the conquest of Laufenburg, Rheinfelden and the fortified Habsburg stronghold of Breisach. Back in French service, he was appointed governor of Breisach and promoted to lieutenant-general in 1647. Erlach fought in the Flanders campaign of 1648 at the end of the war, and became the commander of the French army in the Holy Roman Empire in 1649. During the Congress of Westphalia he supported the French ambassadors in the negotiations regarding Alsace, and pushed for the annexation of the four Waldstädte ("forest cities") of Rheinfelden, Säckingen, Laufenburg and Waldshut. Erlach died in Breisach on 26 January 1650, aged 55, and was buried in Schinznach-Dorf.
