= Schinznach (disambiguation) =

Schinznach may refer to:

- Schinznach-Bad, Aargau, Switzerland
- Schinznach-Dorf, a former municipality in Aargau, Switzerland
- Schinznach, a new municipality created in 2014 in Aargau, Switzerland
