= Auenstein =

Auenstein may refer to:

- Auenstein, Switzerland, a municipality in the canton of Aargau
- Auenstein, Germany, a part of the municipality of Ilsfeld in the district of Heilbronn, Baden-Württemberg
- Schloss Auenstein, a castle at Auenstein, Switzerland
