= Overbeck =

Overbeck is a surname of German origin. It may refer to:

- Carla Overbeck (1968–) is an American soccer player and longtime member and captain of the United States women's national soccer team.
- Christian Adolph Overbeck (1755–1821) was a German poet, and the Burgomaster of Lübeck.
- Christian Friedrich Wilhelm Overbeck (1790–1843) was a German educator and teacher.
- Franz Overbeck (1837–1905) was a German Protestant theologian, best known in regard to his friendship with Friedrich Nietzsche.
- Franz-Josef Overbeck (born 1964), German Roman Catholic bishop
- Henry J. Overbeck (1853–1921), American politician.
- Johann Friedrich Overbeck (1789–1869) was a German painter and member of the Nazarene movement.
- Johannes Overbeck (1826–1895) was a German archaeologist and art historian who was born in Antwerp.
- Julian Joseph Overbeck (1820–1905) was a former Roman Catholic priest who converted to Eastern Orthodoxy and became a pioneer of Western Rite Orthodoxy.
- Otto Overbeck (1860–1937) was an early 20th-century advocate of electrotherapy. He was the son of Julian Joseph Overbeck.
- The Overbeck Sisters were four women potters and artists of the Arts and Crafts Movement who worked in Cambridge City, Indiana from 1911 until 1955.
- T. Jerome Overbeck is an American author and Christian theologian who is also a prominent priest of the Society of Jesus.
- Wilcox P. Overbeck (1912–1980) was an American electrical and nuclear engineer.
- William "Bill" Overbeck, fictional character in the 2008 horror game Left 4 Dead and the 2016 horror game Dead by Daylight.
- Gustav Overbeck (1830–1894) was a German businessman, adventurer and diplomat who briefly nominally served as the Maharaja Sabah, Rajah Gaya and Sandakan in Borneo.
