= Auenstein Castle =

Castle in Auenstein, Switzerland

- Schloss Auenstein
- Auenstein
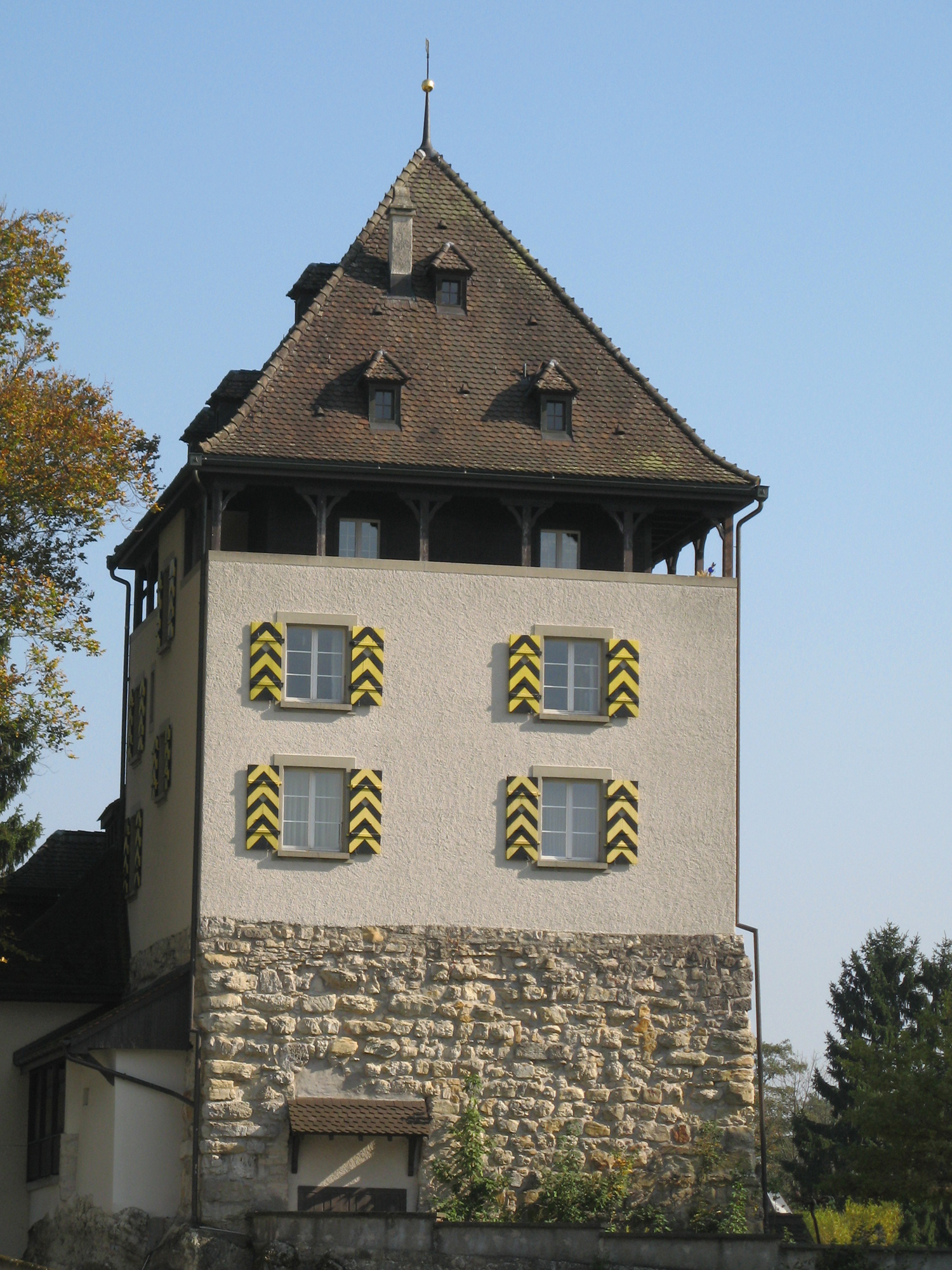
- Auenstein Castle

Site information
- Code: CH-AG
- Condition: preserved

Location
- Coordinates: 47°24′55.48″N 8°8′23.17″E

Site history
- Built: 13th century

Auenstein Castle (German: Schloss Auenstein) is a castle in the municipality of Auenstein in the Swiss canton of Aargau.

== History ==
The castle was built on a rocky hill above the Aare river in the 13th century for a local nobleman named Gowenstein. Around 1300 it was acquired by the Lord of Rinach. During a war between the Habsburgs and the Old Swiss Confederacy in 1389, a Bernese army sacked and burned the castle. Following the Bernese conquest of the Aargau in 1415, Auenstein became a part of the Landvogtei of Lenzburg. Over the following decades, the Lords of Rinach were unable to rebuild the castle. In 1465 Albrecht von Rinach sold the ruins and surrounding villages to Heinrich Hasfurter from Lucerne. The castle remained ruined, but over the following centuries the ruined castle and the attached Herrschaft passed through several owners. In 1732 the castle and territory came under direct Bernese control, and it remained that way for the following half century. Until the 1798 French invasion and the Helvetic Republic swept away the old medieval system of noble landlords who ruled over villages and estates. With the creation of the Canton of Aargau in the 1803 Act of Mediation the ruins became the property of the new canton.

In the 1850s the ruins were sold to a private owner who began building a new castle from the ruins. By 1858 there was once again a habitable castle on the site. The new castle was sold several times until in the early 20th century Mrs. A. Hoffmann acquired Auenstein. She renovated and expanded the castle and in 1927-29 it reached its current appearance. It was sold again in 1970 to the Reller family. In 2007 Roger Reller attempted to sell the castle for 6 million CHF, but could not find a buyer. In 2009, Mr. Reller moved his real estate company into the castle and added a garage to store his automobile collection.

== See also ==
- List of castles and fortresses in Switzerland
