= Oberflachs =

- Former municipality
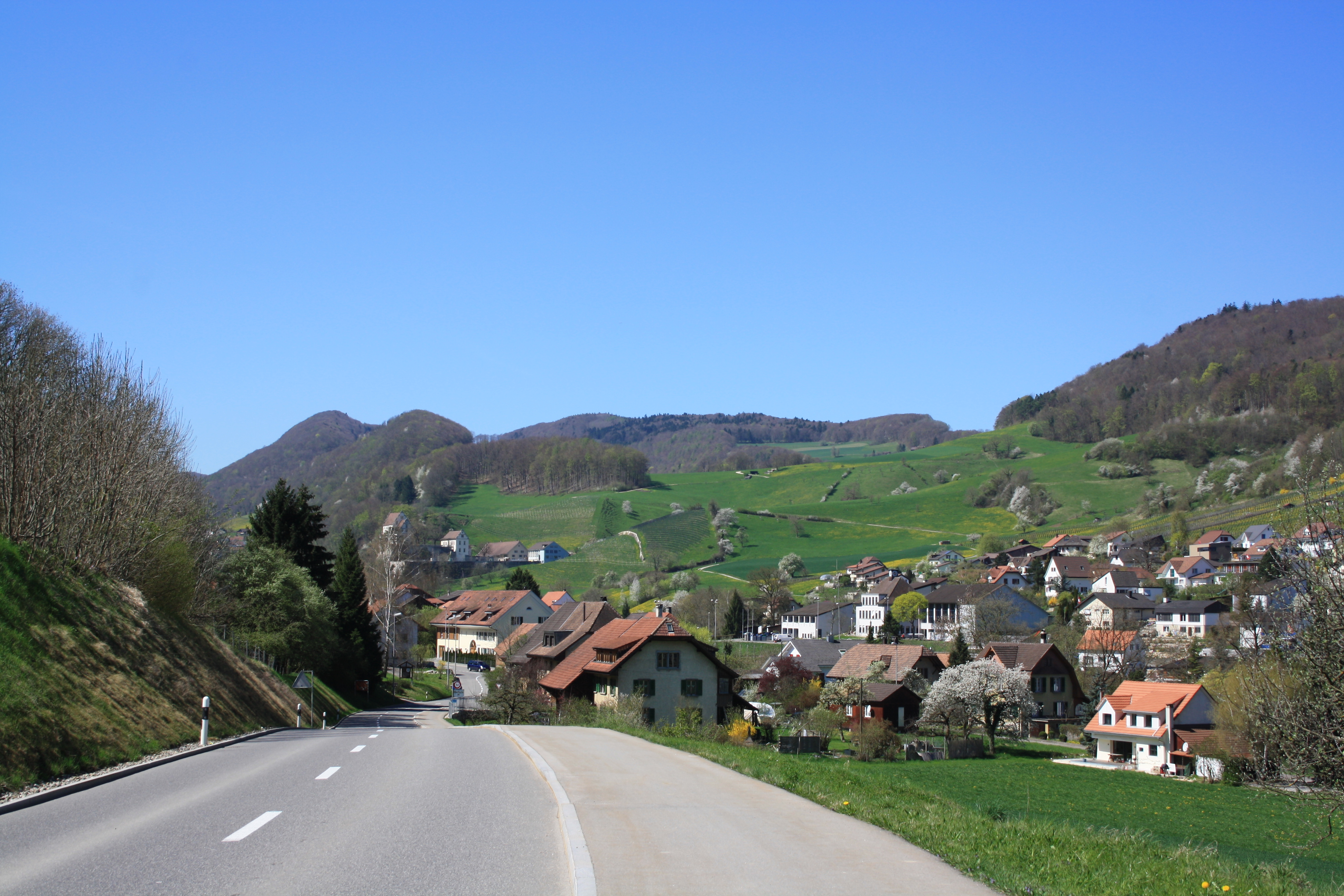

- Flag Coat of arms
- Location of Oberflachs
- Location within Switzerland Location within Canton of Aargau
- Coordinates: 47°27′N 8°08′E
- Country: Switzerland
- Canton: Aargau
- District: Brugg (district)

Area
  - Total: 3.38 km^{2} (1.31 sq mi)
- Elevation: 401 m (1,316 ft)

Population (Dec 2011)
  - Total: 498
  - Density: 147/km^{2} (382/sq mi)
- Time zone: UTC+01:00 (CET)
  - Summer (DST): UTC+02:00 (CEST)
- Postal code: 5108
- SFOS number: 4109
- ISO 3166 code: CH-AG
- Surrounded by: Auenstein, Schinznach-Dorf, Thalheim, Veltheim
- Twin towns: Seitingen-Oberflacht (Germany)
- Website: oberflachs.ch

Oberflachs is a former municipality in the district of Brugg in Canton Aargau in Switzerland. It is located about 6 km south west of the town of Brugg. On 1 January 2014 the former municipalities of Oberflachs and Schinznach-Dorf merged into the new municipality of Schinznach.

== History ==
Aerial view (1953)

While various Roman era bricks and coins have been discovered, the first record of Oberflachs is in 1342 as Obreflaht. From the Middle Ages until 1732, Kasteln Castle held the rights to low justice in the village. The rights to administer High Justice was held by the bailiwick of Schenkenberg and was acquired in 1460 by the city of Bern. In 1732 the village came fully under Bern's authority when Bern bought the Kasteln Castle. By 1607 the village is identified as a partly independent municipality.

Oberflachs was, like the whole Schenkenbergertal in the 18th century, a very poor municipality. Grain and vineyard cultivation were the major economic sources in the 17th century. However, in 1850 wine production collapsed because of vine diseases and phylloxera. The poverty and collapse of the wine industry forced many residents (particularly in the 1880s) to emigrate overseas. The wine recovered, so that in 1990 there were 22 hectares cultivated.

In the 1970s several new housing districts were built. In 1960, the number of commuters exceeded the number of locals that worked in the municipality. In 2005, agriculture provided 28% of the jobs in the community. A merger of Oberflachs with four municipalities failed in 2009 because Veltheim voters rejected the proposal.

== Geography ==
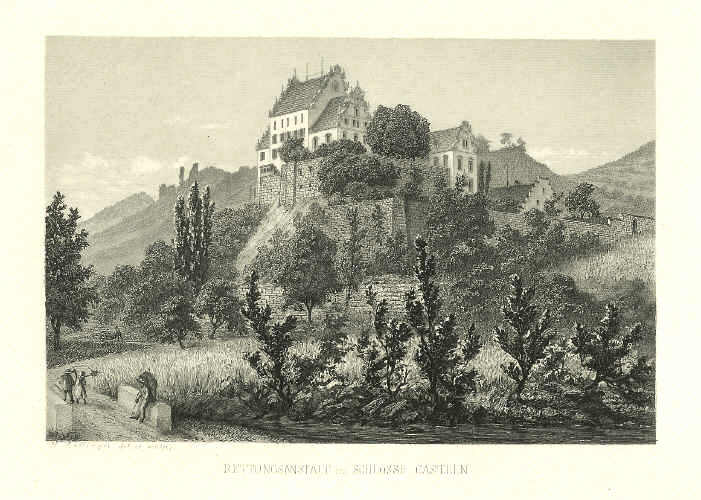
Kasteln castle

Before the merger, Oberflachs had a total area of 3.4 km^{2} (1.3 mi^{2}). Of this area, 1.84 square kilometers (0.71 sq mi) or 54.4% is used for agricultural purposes, while 1.27 square kilometers (0.49 sq mi) or 37.6% is forested. Of the rest of the land, 0.3 square kilometers (0.12 sq mi) or 8.9% is settled (buildings or roads).

Of the built up area, housing and buildings made up 5.9% and transportation infrastructure made up 2.4%. 34.6% of the total land area is heavily forested and 3.0% is covered with orchards or small clusters of trees. Of the agricultural land, 18.0% is used for growing crops and 25.7% is pastures, while 10.7% is used for orchards or vine crops.

The former municipality is located in the Brugg district, at the foot of the Schenkenbergertal. It consists of the linear village of Oberflachs and Kasteln Castle. The highest point has an elevation of 770 meters (2,530 ft), and the lowest point, 395 m (1,296 ft).

== Coat of arms ==
The blazon of the municipal coat of arms is Argent three Flax flowers Azure seeded Or slipped and leaved Vert in saltire and in pale. This is an example of canting with the German word for flax being Flachs.

== Demographics ==
Oberflachs had a population (as of 2011) of 498. As of June 2009, 4.2% of the population are foreign nationals. Over the last 10 years (1997–2007) the population has changed at a rate of 10.7%. Most of the population (as of 2000) speaks German (98.3%), with English being second most common ( 1.1%) and Italian being third ( 0.4%).

The age distribution, as of 2008, in Oberflachs is; 56 children or 11.7% of the population are between 0 and 9 years old and 70 teenagers or 14.6% are between 10 and 19. Of the adult population, 39 people or 8.1% of the population are between 20 and 29 years old. 62 people or 12.9% are between 30 and 39, 78 people or 16.3% are between 40 and 49, and 63 people or 13.1% are between 50 and 59. The senior population distribution is 59 people or 12.3% of the population are between 60 and 69 years old, 35 people or 7.3% are between 70 and 79, there are 13 people or 2.7% who are between 80 and 89, and there are 5 people or 1.0% who are 90 and older.

In 2008 there were 113 single family homes (or 53.6% of the total) out of a total of 211 homes and apartments. There were a total of 0 empty apartments. As of 2007, the construction rate of new housing units was 4.1 new units per 1000 residents.

In the 2007 federal election the most popular party was the SVP which received 45.1% of the vote. The next three most popular parties were the FDP (12.1%), the Green Party (11.5%) and the SP (9.9%).

In Oberflachs about 80% of the population (between age 25–64) have completed either non-mandatory upper secondary education or additional higher education (either university or a Fachhochschule). Of the school age population (in the 2008/2009 school year), there are 48 students attending primary school in the municipality.

The historical population is given in the following table:

Historical population
Year	Pop.	±%
1764	215	—
1850	512	+138.1%
1900	428	−16.4%
1950	364	−15.0%
2000	468	+28.6%

== Sights ==
The village of Oberflachs is designated as part of the Inventory of Swiss Heritage Sites.

== Economy ==
As of 2007, Oberflachs had an unemployment rate of 1.3%. As of 2005, there were 37 people employed in the primary economic sector and about 12 businesses involved in this sector. 22 people are employed in the secondary sector and there are 4 businesses in this sector. 74 people are employed in the tertiary sector, with 10 businesses in this sector.

As of 2000 there was a total of 226 workers who lived in the municipality. Of these, 175 or about 77.4% of the residents worked outside Oberflachs while 49 people commuted into the municipality for work. There were a total of 100 jobs (of at least 6 hours per week) in the municipality. Of the working population, 5.1% used public transportation to get to work, and 55.1% used a private car.

== Religion ==
From the 2000 census, 76 or 16.2% were Roman Catholic, while 340 or 72.6% belonged to the Swiss Reformed Church. Of the rest of the population, there was 1 individual who belonged to the Christian Catholic faith.
