= Christian Friedrich Wilhelm Overbeck =

German educator and teacher

Christian Friedrich Wilhelm Overbeck (born 27 October 1790 in Lippstadt; died 2 April 1843 in Hanover) was a German educator and teacher. He served as senior teacher (Oberlehrer) of mathematics and physics at the Lyceum in Hanover.

Overbeck came from the Lippe region, where his ancestors had resided for generations. His great-grandfather was August Wilhelm (1747–1817).

A street in Cologne Neuehrenfeld, the Overbeckstraße, is named after the educational reformer.

== Publications (selection) ==
- Beispiele und Aufgaben aus allen Theilen der Elementar-Mathematik. Hahn, Hannover 1837

== See also ==
- Kaiser-Wilhelm- und Ratsgymnasium Hannover (in German)

== Bibliography ==
- Deutsches Geschlechterbuch: Genealogisches Handbuch Bürgerlicher Familien, Band 167. C.A. Starke Verlag, Limburg an der Lahn 1974
