= Thalheim, Aargau =

Thalheim
- Municipality
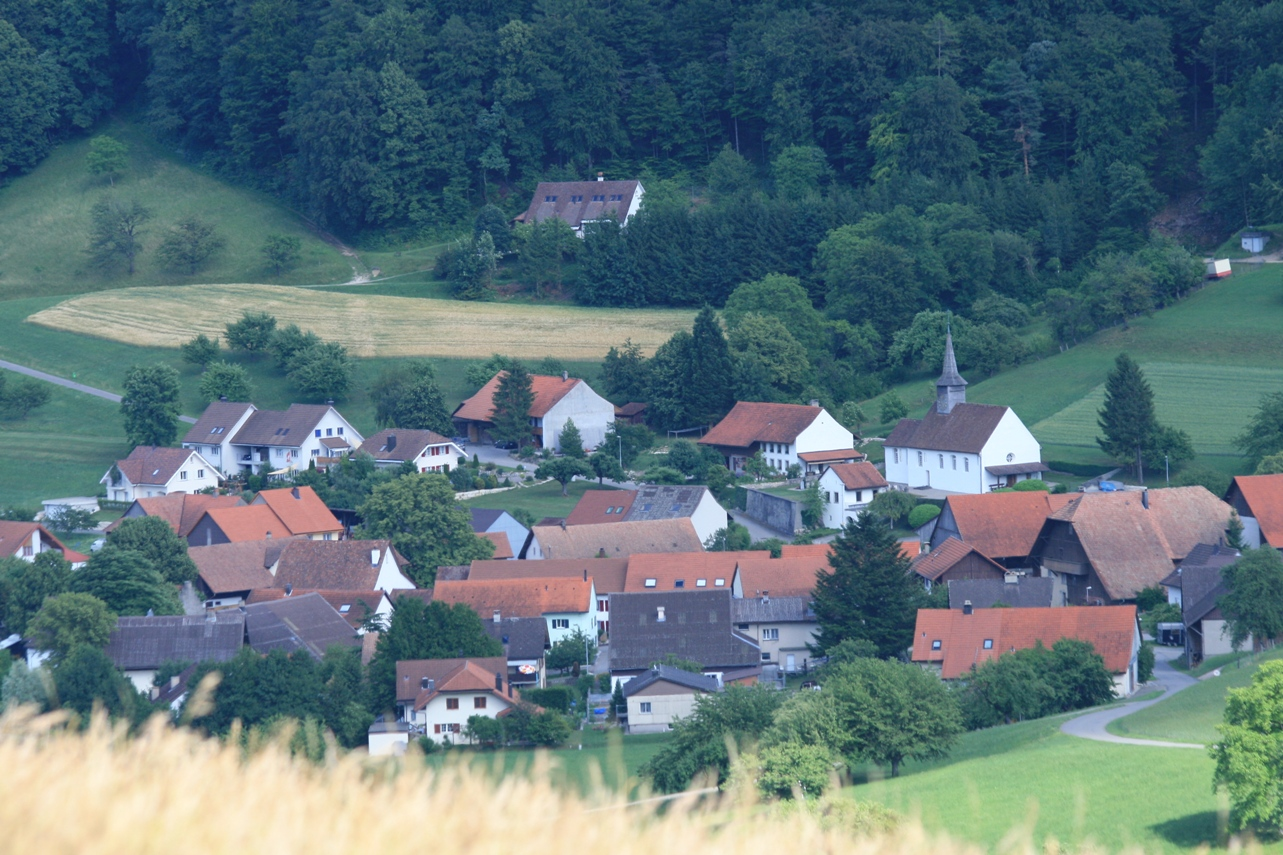

- Flag Coat of arms
- Location of Thalheim
- Location within Switzerland Location within Canton of Aargau
- Coordinates: 47°26′N 8°6′E
- Country: Switzerland
- Canton: Aargau
- District: Brugg

Area
  - Total: 9.91 km^{2} (3.83 sq mi)
- Elevation: 451 m (1,480 ft)

Population (December 2020)
  - Total: 820
  - Density: 83/km^{2} (210/sq mi)
- Time zone: UTC+01:00 (CET)
  - Summer (DST): UTC+02:00 (CEST)
- Postal code: 5112
- SFOS number: 4117
- ISO 3166 code: CH-AG
- Surrounded by: Auenstein, Biberstein, Densbüren, Küttigen, Oberflachs, Schinznach-Dorf, Zeihen
- Website: gemeinde-thalheim.ch

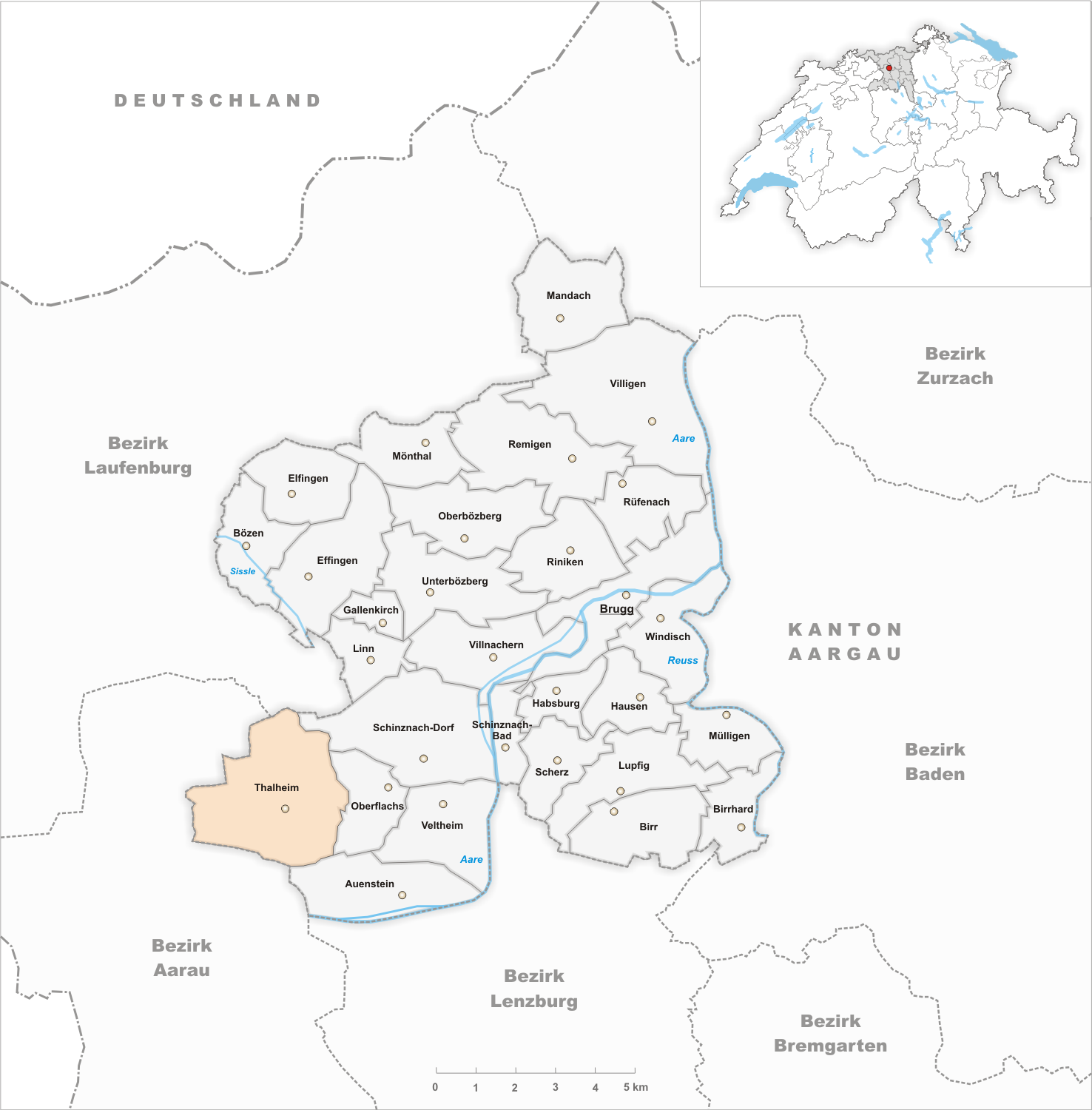
Thalheim

Thalheim is a municipality in the district of Brugg in the canton of Aargau in Switzerland.

== Geography ==
Aerial view (1953)

Thalheim has an area, as of 2009, of 9.91 square kilometers (3.83 sq mi). Of this area, 4.95 square kilometers (1.91 sq mi) or 49.9% is used for agricultural purposes, while 4.31 square kilometers (1.66 sq mi) or 43.5% is forested. Of the rest of the land, 0.57 square kilometers (0.22 sq mi) or 5.8% is settled (buildings or roads), 0.01 km^{2} (2.5 acres) or 0.1% is either rivers or lakes.

Of the built up area, housing and buildings made up 2.4% and transportation infrastructure made up 2.7%. 40.1% of the total land area is heavily forested and 3.4% is covered with orchards or small clusters of trees. Of the agricultural land, 17.9% is used for growing crops and 29.7% is pastures, while 2.4% is used for orchards or vine crops. All the water in the municipality is in rivers and streams.

== Coat of arms ==
The blazon of the municipal coat of arms is Argent a Grape Azure slipped and leaved Vert.

== Demographics ==
Thalheim has a population (as of December 2020) of 820 As of June 2009, 4.7% of the population are foreign nationals. Over the last 10 years (1997–2007) the population has changed at a rate of -6.3%. Most of the population (as of 2000) speaks German (98.5%), with Italian being second most common ( 0.4%) and Portuguese being third ( 0.3%).

The age distribution, as of 2008, in Thalheim is; 58 children or 7.8% of the population are between 0 and 9 years old and 100 teenagers or 13.5% are between 10 and 19. Of the adult population, 80 people or 10.8% of the population are between 20 and 29 years old. 68 people or 9.2% are between 30 and 39, 138 people or 18.7% are between 40 and 49, and 117 people or 15.8% are between 50 and 59. The senior population distribution is 92 people or 12.4% of the population are between 60 and 69 years old, 53 people or 7.2% are between 70 and 79, there are 30 people or 4.1% who are between 80 and 89, and there are 3 people or 0.4% who are 90 and older.

As of 2000, there were 32 homes with 1 or 2 persons in the household, 120 homes with 3 or 4 persons in the household, and 127 homes with 5 or more persons in the household. The average number of people per household was 2.61 individuals. As of 2000, there were 285 private households (homes and apartments) in the municipality, and an average of 2.6 persons per household. In 2008 there were 143 single family homes (or 44.1% of the total) out of a total of 324 homes and apartments. There were a total of 0 empty apartments for a 0.0% vacancy rate. As of 2007, the construction rate of new housing units was 1.4 new units per 1000 residents.

In the 2007 federal election the most popular party was the SVP which received 54.6% of the vote. The next three most popular parties were the SP (12.3%), the CVP (7.8%) and the FDP (7.7%).

In Thalheim about 74.9% of the population (between age 25-64) have completed either non-mandatory upper secondary education or additional higher education (either university or a Fachhochschule). Of the school age population (in the 2008/2009 school year), there are 46 students attending primary school in the municipality.

The historical population is given in the following table:

Historical population
Year	Pop.	±%
1975	551	—
1980	565	+2.5%
1990	645	+14.2%
2000	758	+17.5%

== Heritage sites of national significance ==
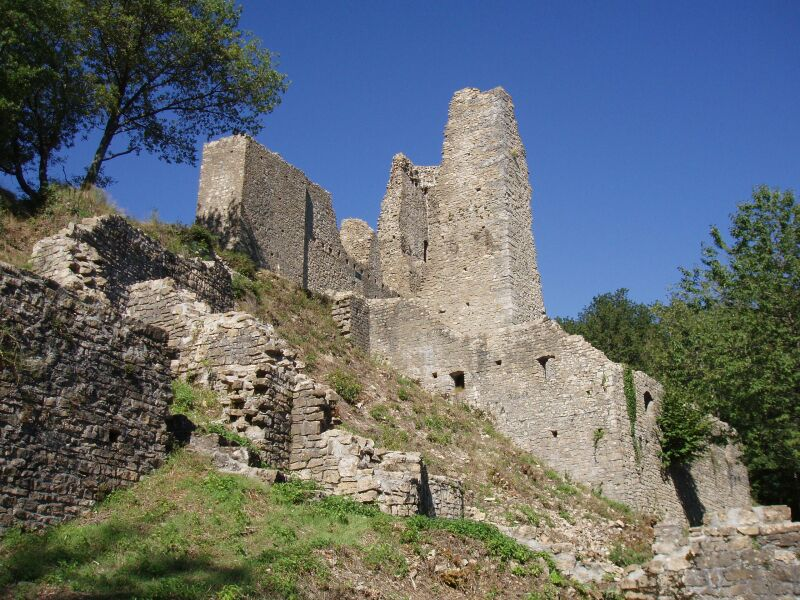
Ruins of Schenkenberg castle

The ruins of Schenkenberg castle are listed as a Swiss heritage site of national significance.

The village of Thalheim is designated as part of the Inventory of Swiss Heritage Sites.

== Economy ==
As of 2007, Thalheim had an unemployment rate of 0.67%. As of 2005, there were 61 people employed in the primary economic sector and about 29 businesses involved in this sector. 64 people are employed in the secondary sector and there are 7 businesses in this sector. 81 people are employed in the tertiary sector, with 21 businesses in this sector.

As of 2000 there was a total of 394 workers who lived in the municipality. Of these, 284 or about 72.1% of the residents worked outside Thalheim while 92 people commuted into the municipality for work. There were a total of 202 jobs (of at least 6 hours per week) in the municipality. Of the working population, 7.8% used public transportation to get to work, and 65% used a private car.

== Religion ==
From the 2000 census, 94 or 12.6% were Roman Catholic, while 570 or 76.6% belonged to the Swiss Reformed Church. Of the rest of the population, there was 1 individual who belonged to the Christian Catholic faith.
