= Dannecker =

Dannecker is a German surname. Notable people with the surname include:

- Martin Dannecker (born 1942), German sexologist and author
- Theodor Dannecker (1913–1945), German SS Hauptsturmführer (captain)

== See also ==
- Johann Heinrich von Dannecker (1758–1841), German sculptor
