= T. Jerome Overbeck =

American author and Christian theologian

Rev. T. Jerome Overbeck, S.J. is an American author and Christian theologian who is also a prominent priest of the Society of Jesus. Since 1983, he has been chaplain, liturgist and professor at Loyola University Chicago with the Loyola University Chicago School of Law and the School of Social Work in Chicago, Illinois. He has also been a professional consultant for the construction and renovation of Roman Catholic places of worship.

Born and raised in Cincinnati, Ohio, he entered the Jesuit religious order—obtaining a bachelor's degree at Loyola University Chicago in 1970 and a master's degree in education at Xavier University in 1972. Overbeck entered the Berkeley Jesuit School of Theology where he obtained a master's degree in divinity in 1974, a master's degree in theology in 1975 and a licentiate of Sacred Theology in 1982. He continued his studies at the Graduate Theological Union and University of California Berkeley, obtaining a doctoral degree in 1983.

Overbeck's most prominent publications were Ancient Fonts, Modern Lessons in 1998, Preparing Your Catholic Wedding in 2002 (2nd edition 2010), and "Hindsight: Wisdom From Couples Who Have Prepared A Wedding And Lived A Marriage" in 2014. Considered a groundbreaking analysis, Spirits, Life, Worship: A Hawaiian Religious and Catholic Perspective was published in 2015 after spending a year researching native Hawaiian religious traditions in Hawaii.
