= Schinznach-Dorf =

- Former municipality
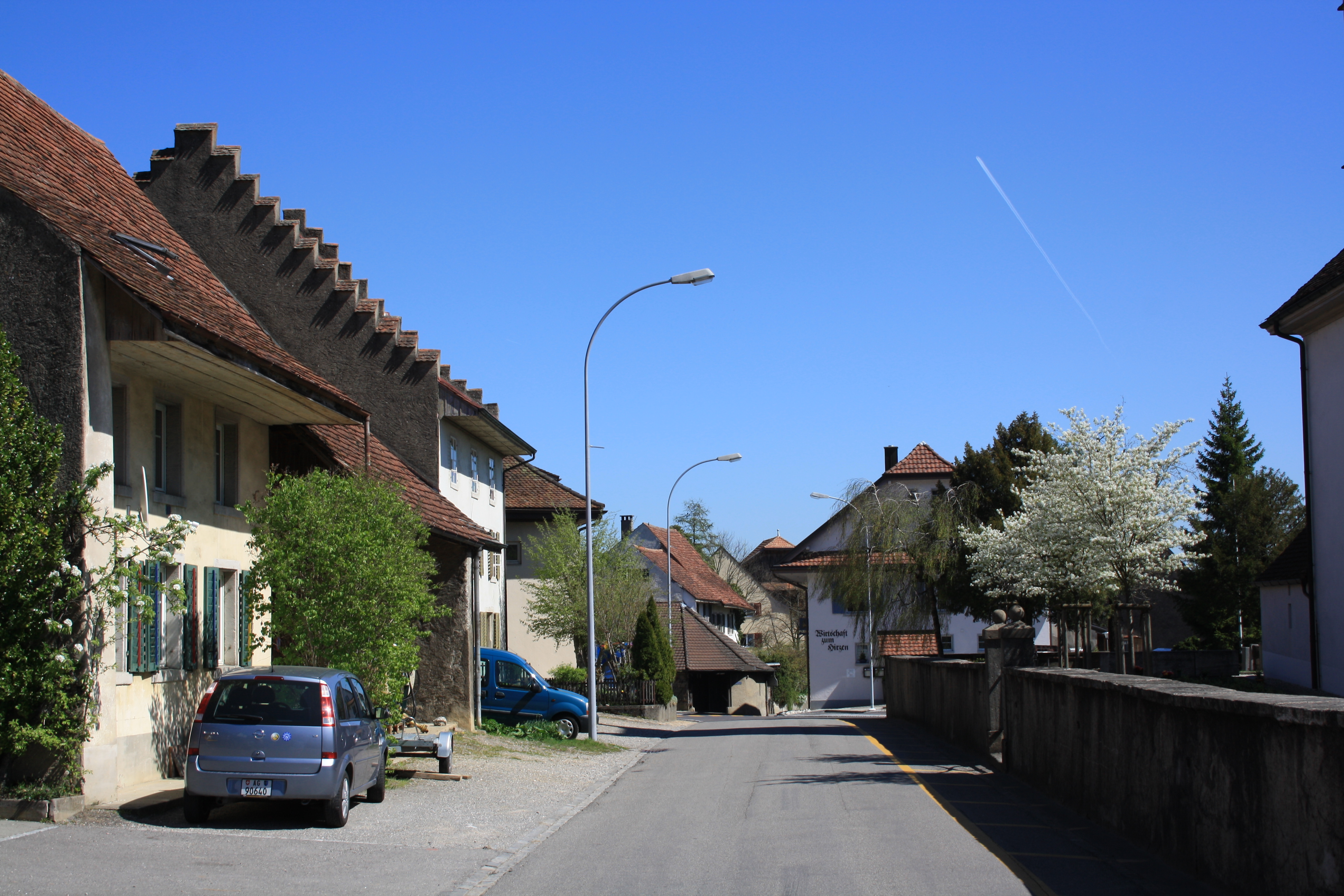

- Flag Coat of arms
- Location of Schinznach-Dorf
- Location within Switzerland Location within Canton of Aargau
- Coordinates: 47°27′N 8°9′E
- Country: Switzerland
- Canton: Aargau
- District: Brugg

Area
  - Total: 8.85 km^{2} (3.42 sq mi)
- Elevation: 383 m (1,257 ft)

Population (Dec 2011)
  - Total: 1,735
  - Density: 196/km^{2} (508/sq mi)
- Time zone: UTC+01:00 (CET)
  - Summer (DST): UTC+02:00 (CEST)
- Postal code: 5107
- SFOS number: 4115
- ISO 3166 code: CH-AG
- Surrounded by: Holderbank, Linn, Oberflachs, Schinznach-Bad, Thalheim, Veltheim, Villnachern, Zeihen
- Website: schinznach-dorf.ch

Schinznach-Dorf is a former municipality in the district of Brugg in canton of Aargau in Switzerland. On 1 January 2014 the former municipalities of Schinznach-Dorf and Oberflachs merged into the new municipality of Schinznach.

== Geography ==
Before the merger, Schinznach-Dorf had a total area of 8.8 km^{2} (3.4 mi^{2}). Of this area, 3.28 square kilometers (1.27 sq mi) or 37.1% is used for agricultural purposes, while 4.07 square kilometers (1.57 sq mi) or 46.0% is forested. Of the rest of the land, 1.19 square kilometers (0.46 sq mi) or 13.4% is settled (buildings or roads), 0.29 square kilometers (0.11 sq mi) or 3.3% is either rivers or lakes.

Of the built up area, industrial buildings made up 1.4% of the total area while housing and buildings made up 5.3% and transportation infrastructure made up 4.3%. Power and water infrastructure as well as other special developed areas made up 1.8% of the area 44.7% of the total land area is heavily forested and 1.2% is covered with orchards or small clusters of trees. Of the agricultural land, 19.7% is used for growing crops and 10.6% is pastures, while 6.8% is used for orchards or vine crops. All the water in the municipality is in rivers and streams.

== Coat of arms ==
The blazon of the municipal coat of arms is Per pale Sable a Crescent decrescent Or and Azure three Mullets Argent in pale.

== Demographics ==
Schinznach-Dorf had a population (as of 2011) of 1,735. As of June 2009, 13.3% of the population are foreign nationals. Over the last 10 years (1997–2007) the population has changed at a rate of -0.4%. Most of the population (as of 2000) speaks German (93.6%), with Spanish being second most common ( 1.2%) and Albanian being third ( 1.2%).

The age distribution, as of 2008, in Schinznach-Dorf is; 133 children or 8.1% of the population are between 0 and 9 years old and 244 teenagers or 14.8% are between 10 and 19. Of the adult population, 188 people or 11.4% of the population are between 20 and 29 years old. 165 people or 10.0% are between 30 and 39, 311 people or 18.9% are between 40 and 49, and 247 people or 15.0% are between 50 and 59. The senior population distribution is 175 people or 10.6% of the population are between 60 and 69 years old, 100 people or 6.1% are between 70 and 79, there are 68 people or 4.1% who are between 80 and 89, and there are 15 people or 0.9% who are 90 and older.

At the same time there were 626 private households (homes and apartments) in the municipality, and an average of 2.5 persons per household.

As of 2000, there were 65 homes with 1 or 2 persons in the household, 221 homes with 3 or 4 persons in the household, and 322 homes with 5 or more persons in the household. The average number of people per household was 2.53 individuals. In 2008 there were 359 single family homes (or 49.7% of the total) out of a total of 723 homes and apartments. There were a total of 0 empty apartments for a 0.0% vacancy rate. As of 2007, the construction rate of new housing units was 1.8 new units per 1000 residents.

In the 2007 federal election the most popular party was the SVP which received 35.1% of the vote. The next three most popular parties were the SP (18.2%), the FDP (17%) and the Green Party (9.6%).

In Schinznach-Dorf about 78.3% of the population (between age 25–64) have completed either non-mandatory upper secondary education or additional higher education (either university or a Fachhochschule). Of the school age population (in the 2008/2009 school year), there are 128 students attending primary school, there are 22 students attending secondary school, there are 174 students attending tertiary or university level schooling in the municipality.

The historical population is given in the following table:

Historical population
Year	Pop.	±%
1975	1,223	—
1980	1,238	+1.2%
1990	1,419	+14.6%
2000	1,630	+14.9%

== Heritage sites of national significance ==
The Reformed Church and Erlach Chapel is listed as a Swiss heritage site of national significance.

The village of Schinznach-Dorf is designated as part of the Inventory of Swiss Heritage Sites.

== Economy ==
As of 2007, Schinznach-Dorf had an unemployment rate of 1.64%. As of 2005, there were 129 people employed in the primary economic sector and about 25 businesses involved in this sector. 318 people are employed in the secondary sector and there are 21 businesses in this sector. 320 people are employed in the tertiary sector, with 50 businesses in this sector.

As of 2000 there was a total of 821 workers who lived in the municipality. Of these, 563 or about 68.6% of the residents worked outside Schinznach-Dorf while 540 people commuted into the municipality for work. There were a total of 798 jobs (of at least 6 hours per week) in the municipality. Of the working population, 14.5% used public transportation to get to work, and 46.7% used a private car.

== Religion ==
From the 2000 census, 372 or 22.7% were Roman Catholic, while 1,014 or 61.9% belonged to the Swiss Reformed Church.
