= Auenstein, Aargau =

Auenstein
- Municipality
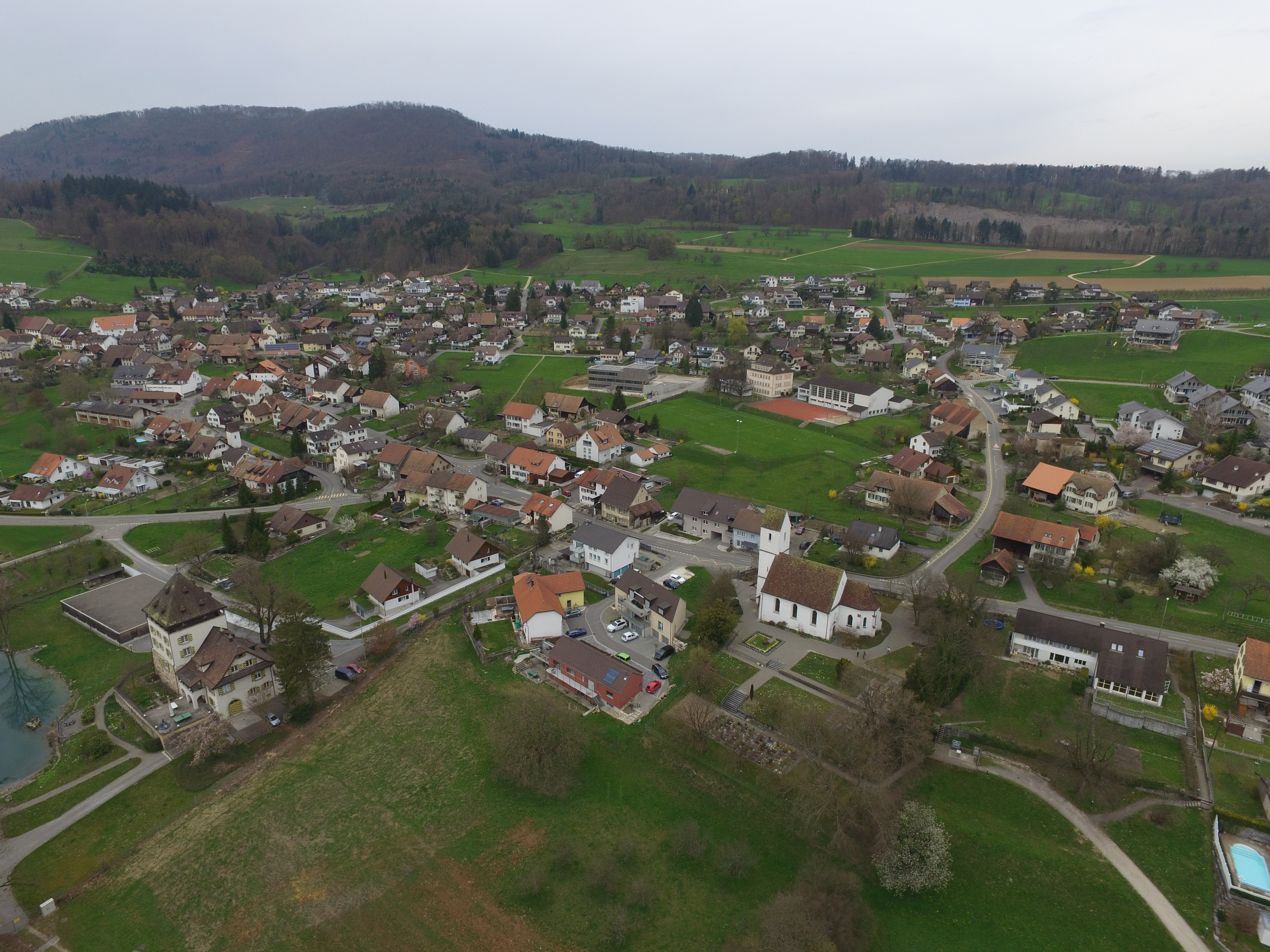

- Flag Coat of arms
- Location of Auenstein
- Location within Switzerland Location within Canton of Aargau
- Coordinates: 47°25′N 8°08′E
- Country: Switzerland
- Canton: Aargau
- District: Brugg

Area
  - Total: 5.68 km^{2} (2.19 sq mi)
- Elevation: 376 m (1,234 ft)

Population (December 2020)
  - Total: 1,613
  - Density: 284/km^{2} (736/sq mi)
- Time zone: UTC+01:00 (CET)
  - Summer (DST): UTC+02:00 (CEST)
- Postal code: 5105
- SFOS number: 4091
- ISO 3166 code: CH-AG
- Surrounded by: Biberstein, Möriken-Wildegg, Oberflachs, Rohr, Rupperswil, Thalheim, Veltheim
- Twin towns: Ilsfeld (Germany)
- Website: www.auenstein.ch

Auenstein is a municipality in the district of Brugg in the canton of Aargau in Switzerland.

It is located about 3 km (1.9 mi) north west of Lenzburg.

== Geography ==
The village lies between the north bank of the Aare river and the south slope of the Mount Gislifluh (elev. 772 m (2,533 ft)), a southern part of the Jura Mountains. The partially very steep slope is mostly forested, but exhibits numerous forest meadows.

Auenstein has an area, as of 2006, of 5.7 square kilometers (2.2 sq mi). Of this area, 31% is used for agricultural purposes, while 46.4% is forested. Of the rest of the land, 17.6% is settled (buildings or roads) and the remainder (4.9%) is non-productive (rivers or lakes).

Neighboring municipalities are Oberflachs and Veltheim to the north, Möriken-Wildegg to the east, Rupperswil to the south, Biberstein to the west, and Thalheim to the northwest. It consists of the village of Auenstein and the hamlets of Fahr. Modern housing developments are north-east and north-west of the original village.

== History ==
Aerial view (1953)

The village was mentioned for the first time in 1212 as Gowenstein. The name probably comes from the small Castle Auenstein on the river Aare, which was built in about 1200 (probably by the lords of Gowenstein). The castle, which was in the possession of the Lords of Rinach until the early 14th century, was burnt down by the Bernese in 1389 as part of the war between the Old Swiss Confederacy and the Habsburgs. The Swiss Confederacy conquered Aargau in 1415. Auenstein belonged to the Bern region (the so-called Bernese Aargau), but the town did not belong to the city itself, rather to some wealthy Bernese families. The reformation occurred in 1528, after which time the owner of the village changed often.

== Sights ==
Castle Auenstein is located on a small cliff on the banks of the Aare. The Castle was destroyed in 1389. The ruins were owned by the canton until 1803, but were later bought privately. The castle was rebuilt to be habitable in 1858, and made into its current shape by 1929. The parish church, first mentioned in 1302, is built in the Gothic and Late Gothic styles, but has decorative elements of the Romanesque style of the 11th century.

== Coat of arms ==
The blazon of the municipal coat of arms is Per pale Gules two Roses Argent barbed and seeded proper and Argent.

== Demographics ==
Auenstein has a population (as of 31 December 2020) of 1,613. As of 2008, 10.0% of the population was made up of foreign nationals. Over the last 10 years (1997–2007) the population has changed at a rate of 6.4%. Most of the population (as of 2000) speaks German (93.4%), with Serbo-Croatian being second most common ( 2.2%) and Albanian being third ( 1.8%).

The age distribution, as of 2008, in Auenstein is; 128 children or 8.8% of the population are between 0 and 9 years old and 157 teenagers or 10.7% are between 10 and 19. Of the adult population, 132 people or 9.0% of the population are between 20 and 29 years old. 166 people or 11.4% are between 30 and 39, 303 people or 20.7% are between 40 and 49, and 235 people or 16.1% are between 50 and 59. The senior population distribution is 167 people or 11.4% of the population are between 60 and 69 years old, 125 people or 8.5% are between 70 and 79, there are 44 people or 3.0% who are between 80 and 89, and there are 5 people or 0.3% who are 90 and older.

As of 2000 the average number of residents per living room was 0.52 which is about equal to the cantonal average of 0.57 per room. In this case, a room is defined as space of a housing unit of at least 4 m^{2} (43 sq ft) as normal bedrooms, dining rooms, living rooms, kitchens and habitable cellars and attics. About 74.4% of the total households were owner occupied, or in other words did not pay rent (though they may have a mortgage or a rent-to-own agreement). As of 2000, there were 31 homes with 1 or 2 persons in the household, 197 homes with 3 or 4 persons in the household, and 319 homes with 5 or more persons in the household. The average number of people per household was 2.44 individuals. In 2008 there were 440 single family homes (or 64.8% of the total) out of a total of 679 homes and apartments. There were a total of 5 empty apartments for a 0.7% vacancy rate. As of 2007, the construction rate of new housing units was 4.1 new units per 1000 residents.

In the 2007 federal election the most popular party was the SVP which received 31.6% of the vote. The next three most popular parties were the SP (18.3%), the FDP (16.3%) and the Other (9.5%).

The entire Swiss population is generally well educated. In Auenstein about 84.5% of the population (between age 25-64) have completed either non-mandatory upper secondary education or additional higher education (either university or a Fachhochschule). Of the school age population (in the 2008/2009 school year), there are 95 students attending primary school in the municipality.

The historical population is given in the following table:

Historical population
Year	Pop.	±%
1764	309	—
1803	447	+44.7%
1850	752	+68.2%
1900	719	−4.4%
1930	743	+3.3%
1950	864	+16.3%
1960	896	+3.7%
1970	1,165	+30.0%
1980	1,166	+0.1%
1990	1,176	+0.9%
2000	1,359	+15.6%
2005	1,421	+4.6%

== Economy ==
As of 2007, Auenstein had an unemployment rate of 1.9%. As of 2005, there were 67 people employed in the primary economic sector and about 15 businesses involved in this sector. 101 people are employed in the secondary sector and there are 19 businesses in this sector. 75 people are employed in the tertiary sector, with 26 businesses in this sector.

As of 2000 there was a total of 724 workers who lived in the municipality. Of these, 605 or about 83.6% of the residents worked outside Auenstein while 108 people commuted into the municipality for work. There were a total of 227 jobs (of at least 6 hours per week) in the municipality. Of the working population, 8.9% used public transportation to get to work, and 61.7% used a private car.

== Religion ==
From the 2000 census, 230 or 16.9% were Roman Catholic, while 883 or 65.0% belonged to the Swiss Reformed Church. Of the rest of the population, there was 1 individual who belonged to the Christian Catholic faith.

== Notable people ==
- Enea Frey (born 2008), racing driver
