= Veltheim =

- Municipality
- Coat of arms

- Location of Veltheim within Wolfenbüttel district
- Interactive map of Veltheim
- Location within Germany Location within Lower Saxony
- Coordinates: 52°13′11″N 10°41′04″E
- Country: Germany
- State: Lower Saxony
- District: Wolfenbüttel
- Municipal assoc.: Sickte

Government
  - Mayor: Alexander von Veltheim (CDU)

Area
  - Total: 8.49 km^{2} (3.28 sq mi)
- Elevation: 130 m (430 ft)

Population (2025-12-31)
  - Total: 954
  - Density: 112/km^{2} (291/sq mi)
- Time zone: UTC+01:00 (CET)
  - Summer (DST): UTC+02:00 (CEST)
- Postal codes: 38173
- Dialling codes: 05305
- Vehicle registration: WF
- Website: www.veltheim-ohe.de

Veltheim (German pronunciation: [ˈfɛlthaɪm]; historically known as Veltheim an der Ohe) is a municipality in the district of Wolfenbüttel, in Lower Saxony, Germany.

== Veltheim family ==
The noble Brunswick ministerialis family von Veltheim was first mentioned in 1160. (See Veltheim family, German article.) They owned Veltheim Castle until 1495, however remained based on other estates that had since been acquired in the Helmstedt, Magdeburg and Harz regions. The von Veltheim family bought back Veltheim Castle in 1832 and they continue to inhabit it.

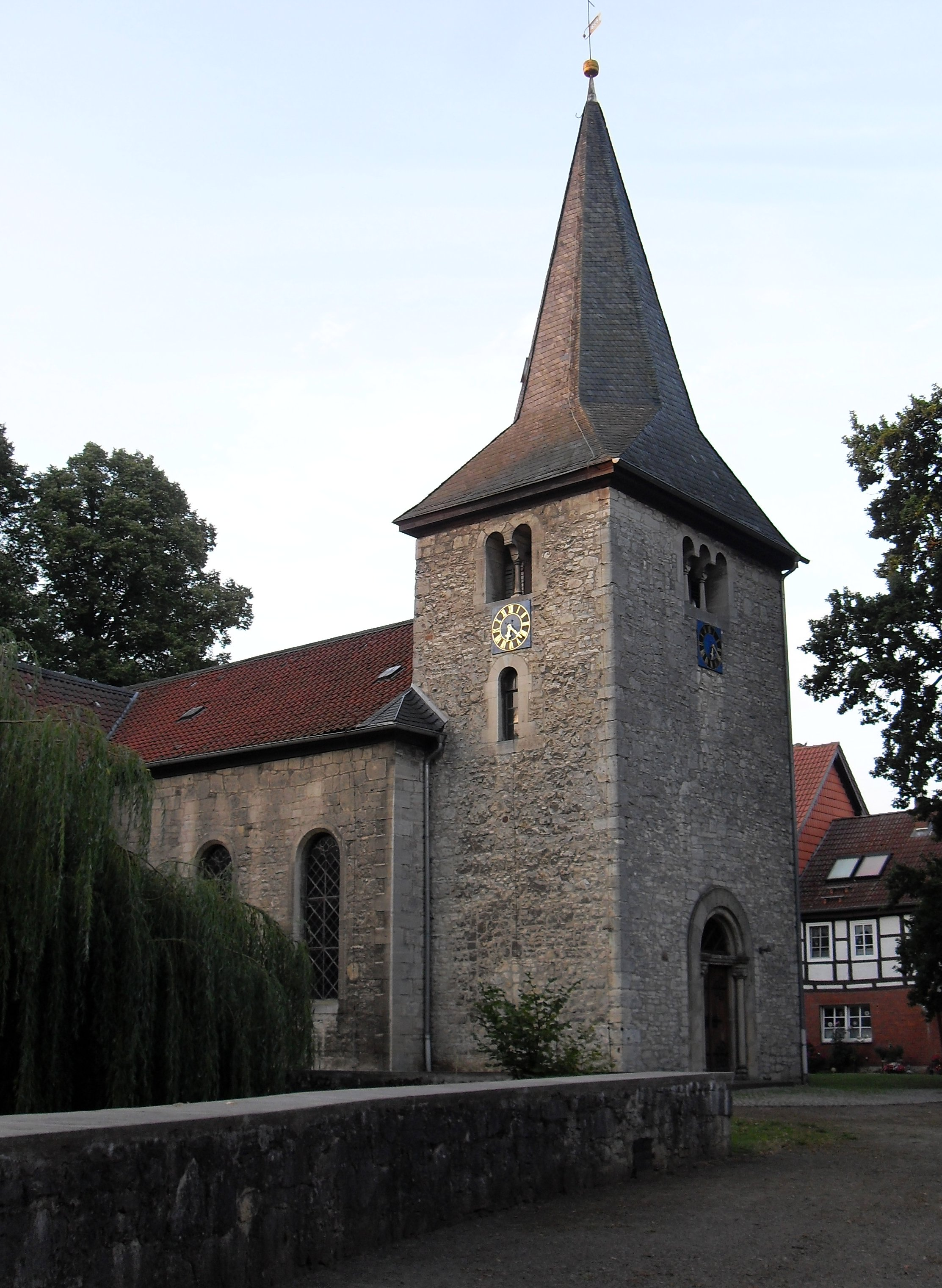
Protestant church in Veltheim

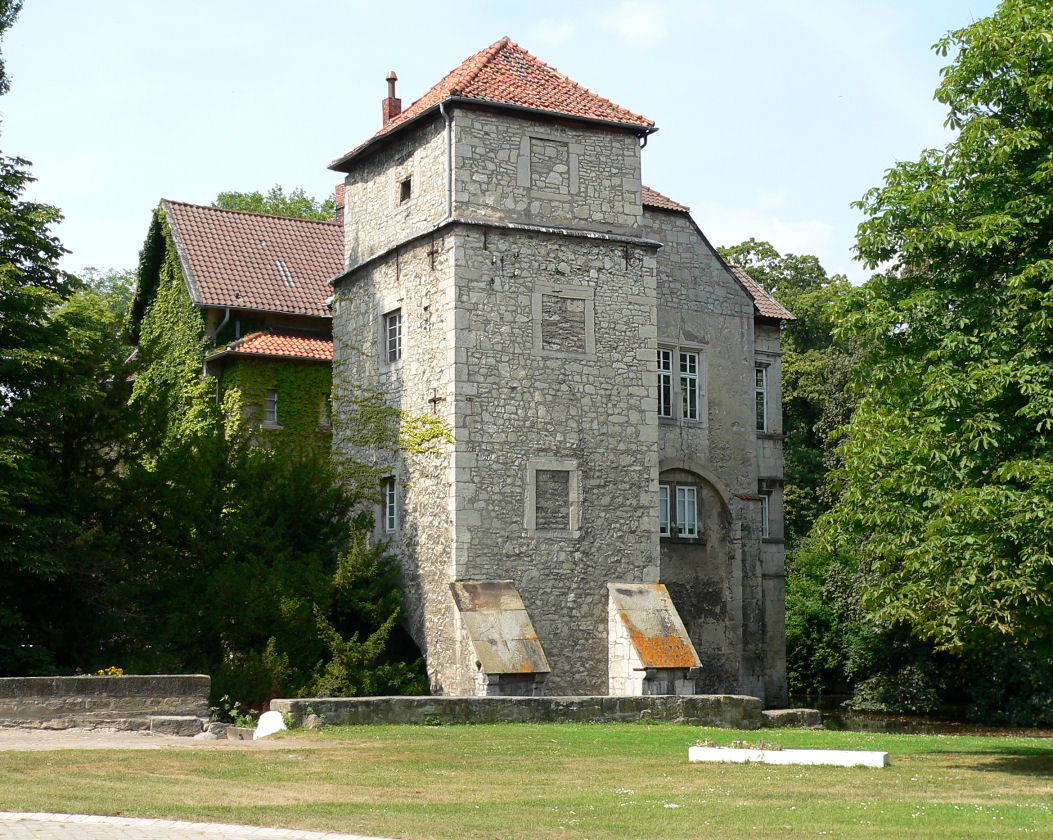
Veltheim Castle

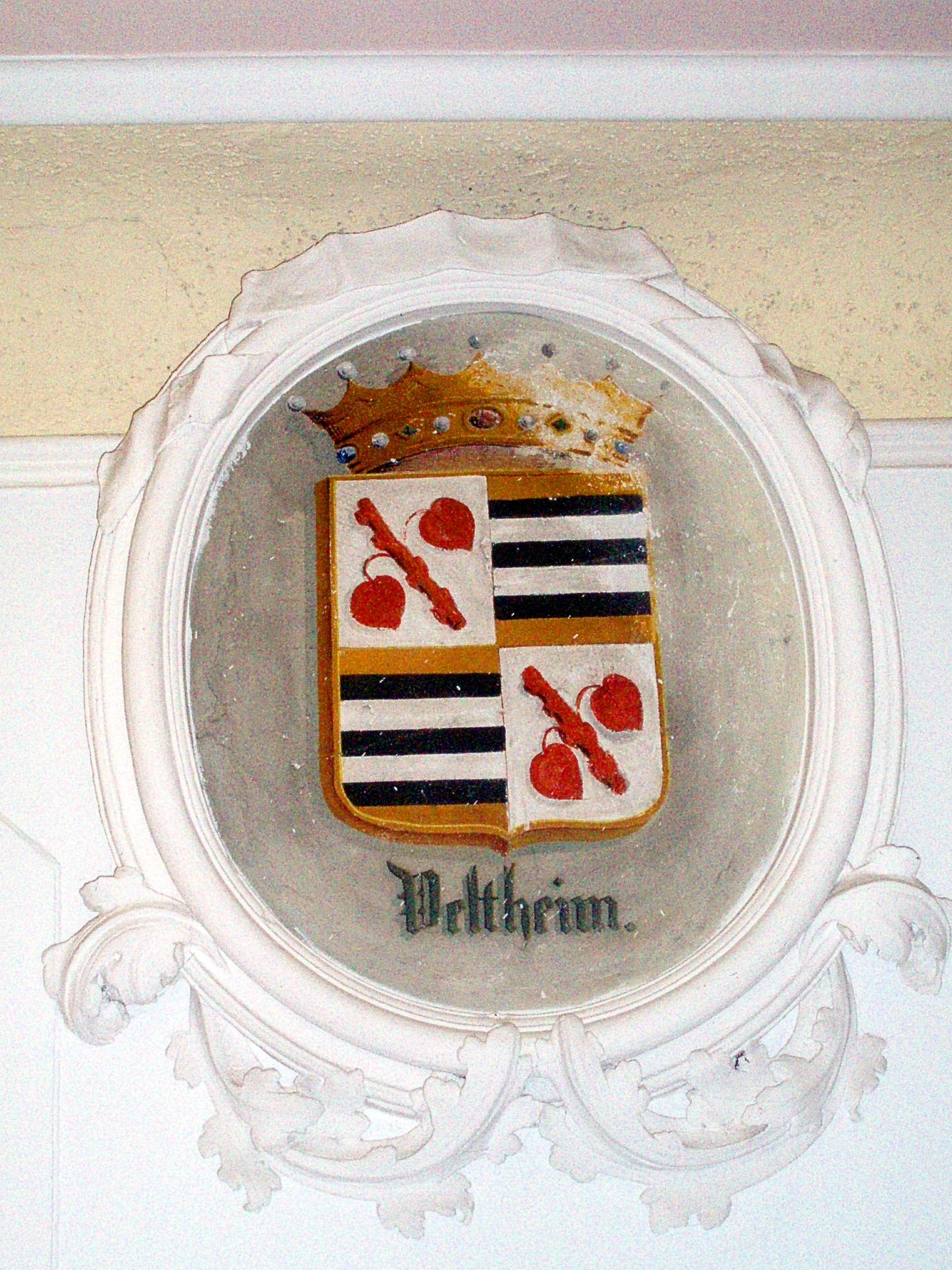
Coat of arms of the noble family von Veltheim
