= Wasserflue =

Mountain of the Jura

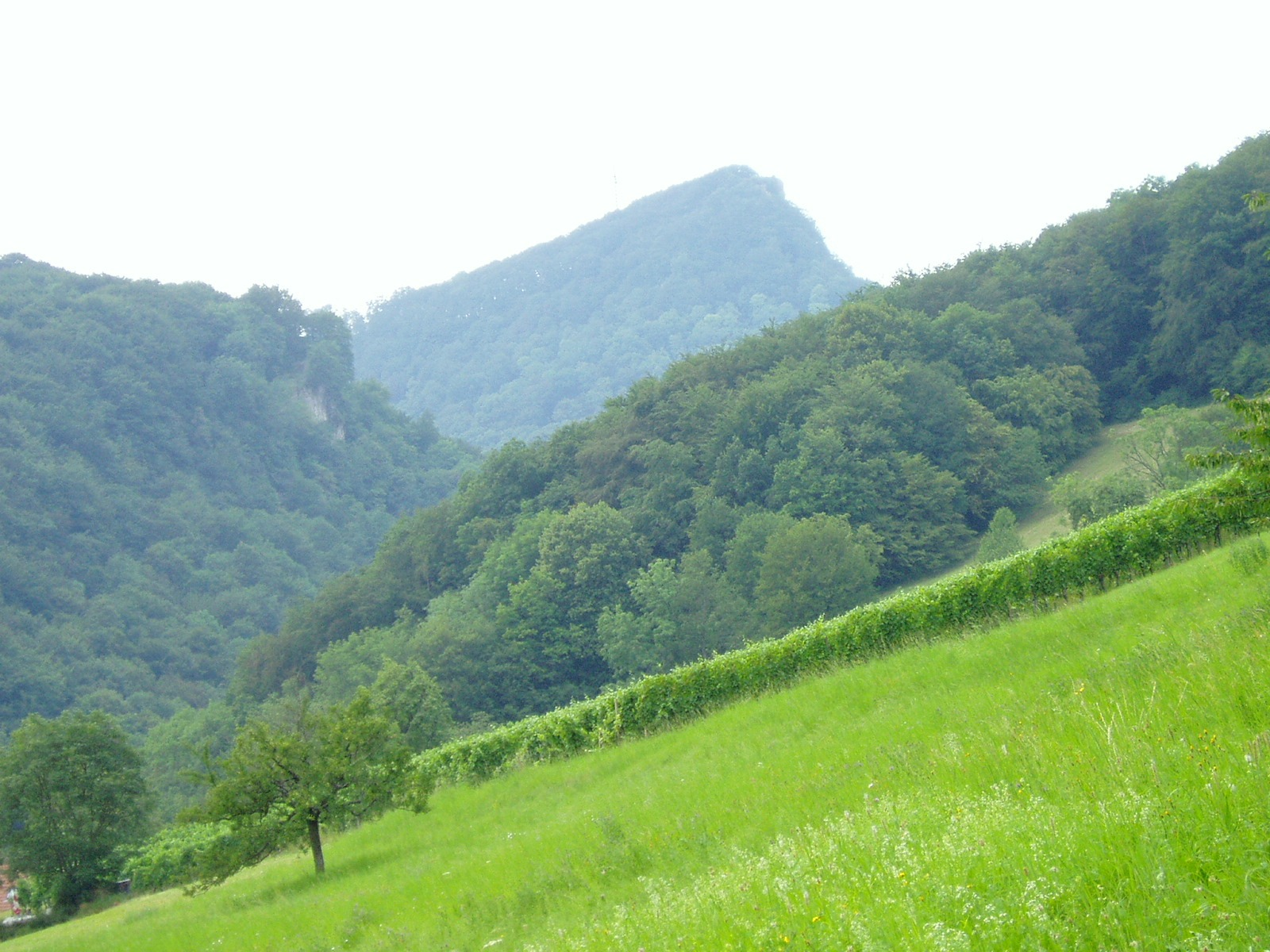
- View from the south

Highest point
- Elevation: 866 m (2,841 ft)
- Prominence: 103 m (338 ft)
- Parent peak: Geissflue
- Coordinates: 47°25′51″N 8°01′17″E

Geography
- Location within Switzerland
- Location: Aargau, Switzerland
- Parent range: Jura Mountains

The Wasserflue (Swiss Standard German pronunciation: [ˈvasərˌfluːɛ]) is a mountain of the Jura, located north of Erlinsbach in the canton of Aargau. It lies on the range east of the Salhöhe Pass.

An antenna is located on the summit
