= Geissflue =

Hill of the eastern Jura Mountains

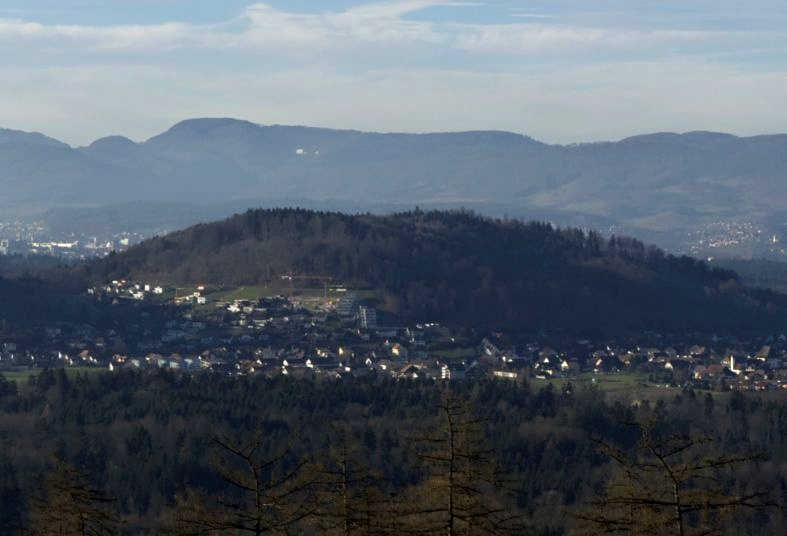

Highest point
- Elevation: 963 m (3,159 ft)
- Coordinates: 47°25′10.5″N 7°57′25.3″E

Geography
- Location within Switzerland
- Location: Basel-Landschaft/Solthurn, Switzerland
- Parent range: Jura Mountains

The Geissflue is a hill of the eastern Jura Mountains, located between the Swiss cantons of Basel-Landschaft and Solothurn. The border with the canton of Aargau runs east of the summit on the Geissfluegrat.

The Geissflue has an elevation of 962 metres above sea level. It is the easternmost summit above 900 metres in the Jura Mountains.
