= Geissfluegrat =

Summit in the eastern Jura Mountains

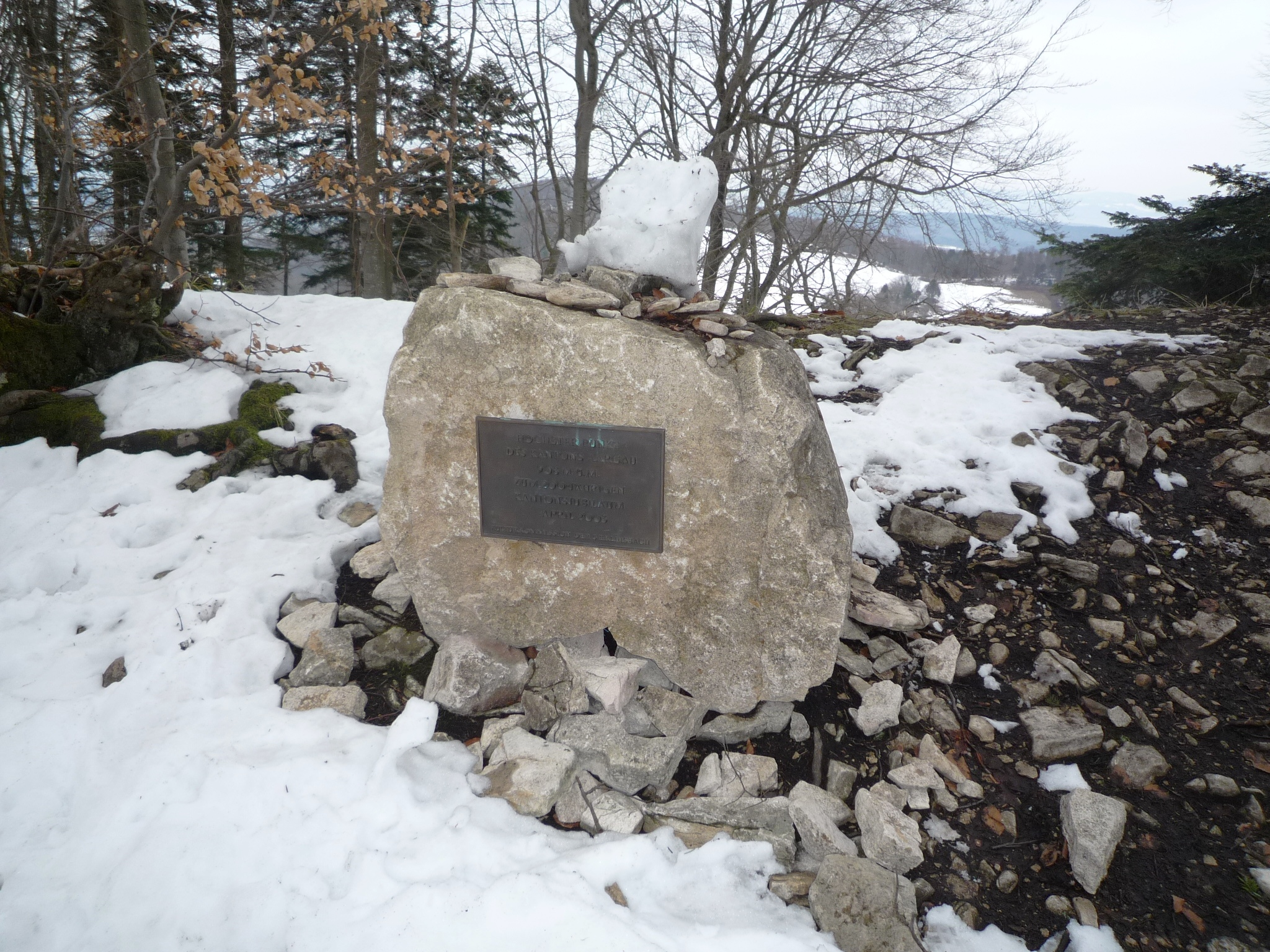
- On the summit

Highest point
- Elevation: 908 m (2,979 ft)
- Prominence: 5 m (16 ft)
- Parent peak: Geissflue
- Listing: Canton high point
- Coordinates: 47°25′22″N 7°57′54″E

Geography
- Location within Switzerland
- Location: Aargau/Solothurn, Switzerland
- Parent range: Jura Mountains

The Geissfluegrat is a minor summit east of the Geissflue, in the eastern Jura Mountains. It is located between the Swiss cantons of Aargau and Solothurn. With an elevation of 908 metres above sea level, the Geissfluegrat is the highest point in Aargau. It is also the easternmost summit above 900 metres in the Jura Mountains.
