= Erlinsbach =

Erlinsbach is the name of two municipalities in Switzerland:

- Erlinsbach, Aargau
- Erlinsbach, Solothurn
