= Hinteri Egg =

Highest point of the Swiss canton of Basel-Country

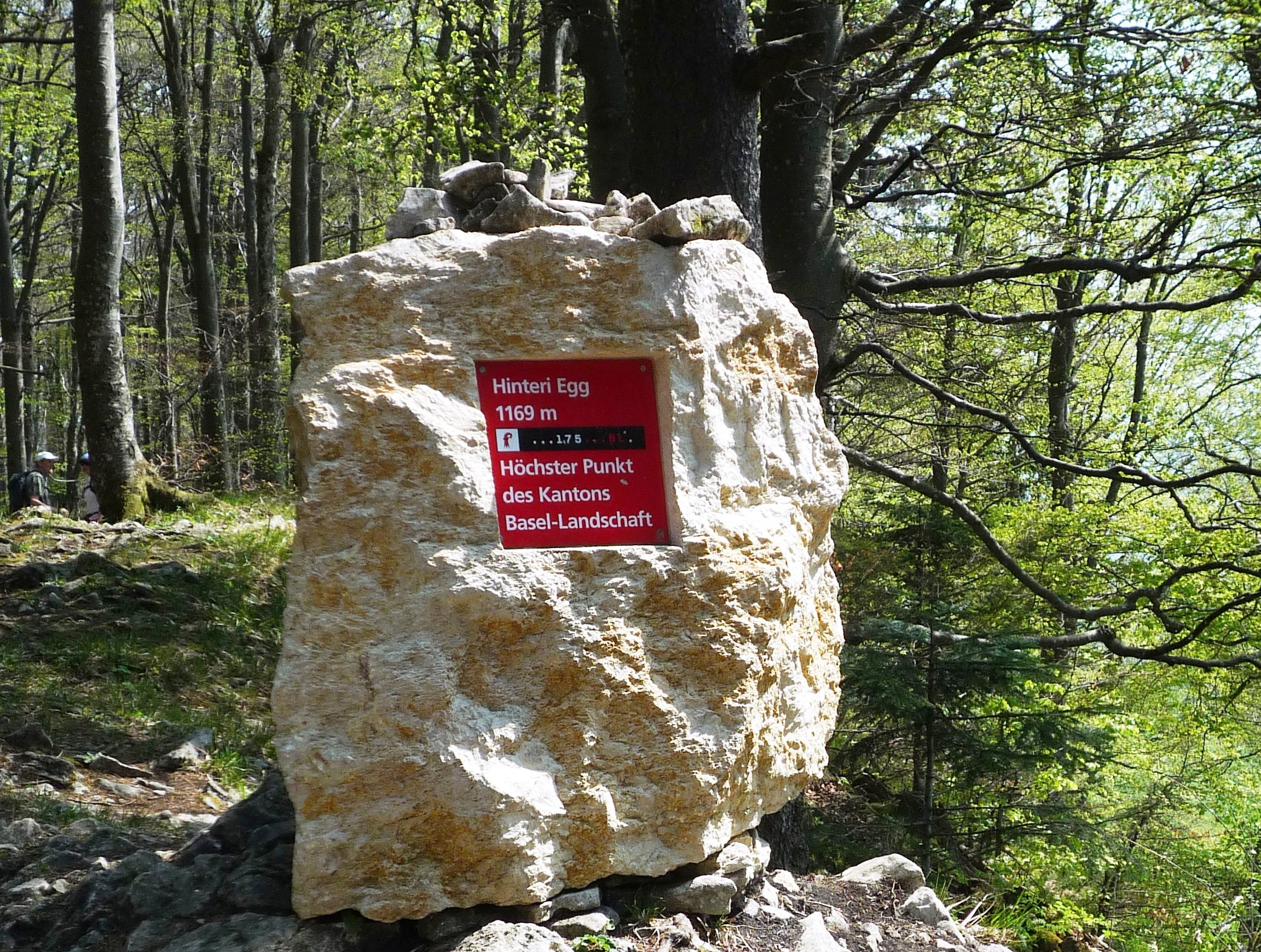
- On the summit

Highest point
- Elevation: 1,169 m (3,835 ft)
- Prominence: 165 m (541 ft)
- Parent peak: Vogelberg (1,204 m)
- Listing: Canton high point
- Coordinates: 47°22′21.3″N 7°42′38.4″E

Geography
- Location within Switzerland
- Location: Basel-Landschaft, Switzerland
- Parent range: Jura Mountains

The Hinteri Egg is a mountain of the Jura, located south of Reigoldswil in the Swiss canton of Basel-Landschaft, close to the border with the canton of Solothurn.

The Hinteri Egg reaches a height of 1,169 metres above sea level and is the highest point of the canton of Basel-Landschaft.
