= Hasenmatt =

Mountain in Solothurn, Switzerland

- Hasenmatt

Highest point
- Elevation: 1,445 m (4,741 ft)
- Prominence: 618 m (2,028 ft)
- Parent peak: Crêt de la Neige
- Isolation: 29.6 km (18.4 mi)
- Listing: Canton high point
- Coordinates: 47°14′31.44″N 7°27′01.84″E

Geography
- Location within Switzerland
- Location: Solothurn, Switzerland
- Parent range: Jura Mountains

Climbing
- Easiest route: Trail

The Hasenmatt is a mountain of the Jura range, located north of Grenchen and Solothurn in the Swiss canton of Solothurn. Reaching a height of 1,445 metres above sea level, it is the highest summit in the canton of Solothurn. The Hasenmatt is also the easternmost summit above 1,400 metres of the Jura Mountains.

The summit of the Hasenmatt can be easily reached by several trails and a road culminating at 1,318 metres.

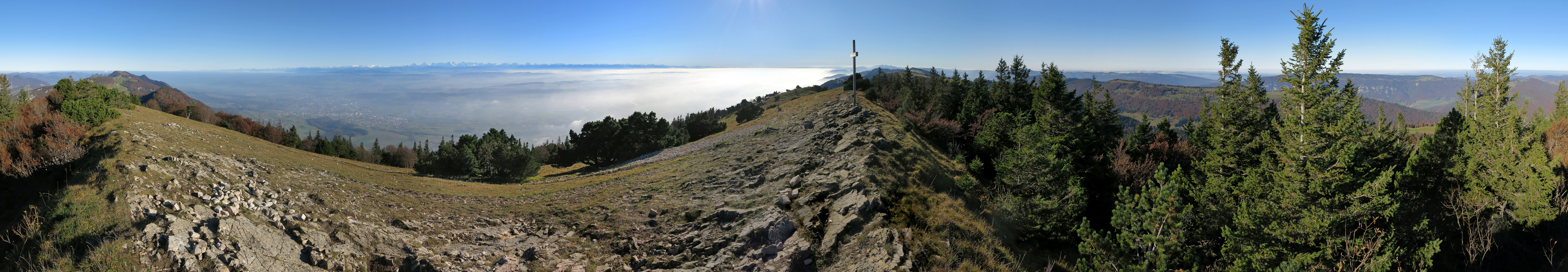
Panoramic view from Hasenmatt

== See also ==
- List of mountains of Switzerland
- List of most isolated mountains of Switzerland
