= Salhöhe Pass =

Mountain pass in the Jura Mountains of Switzerland

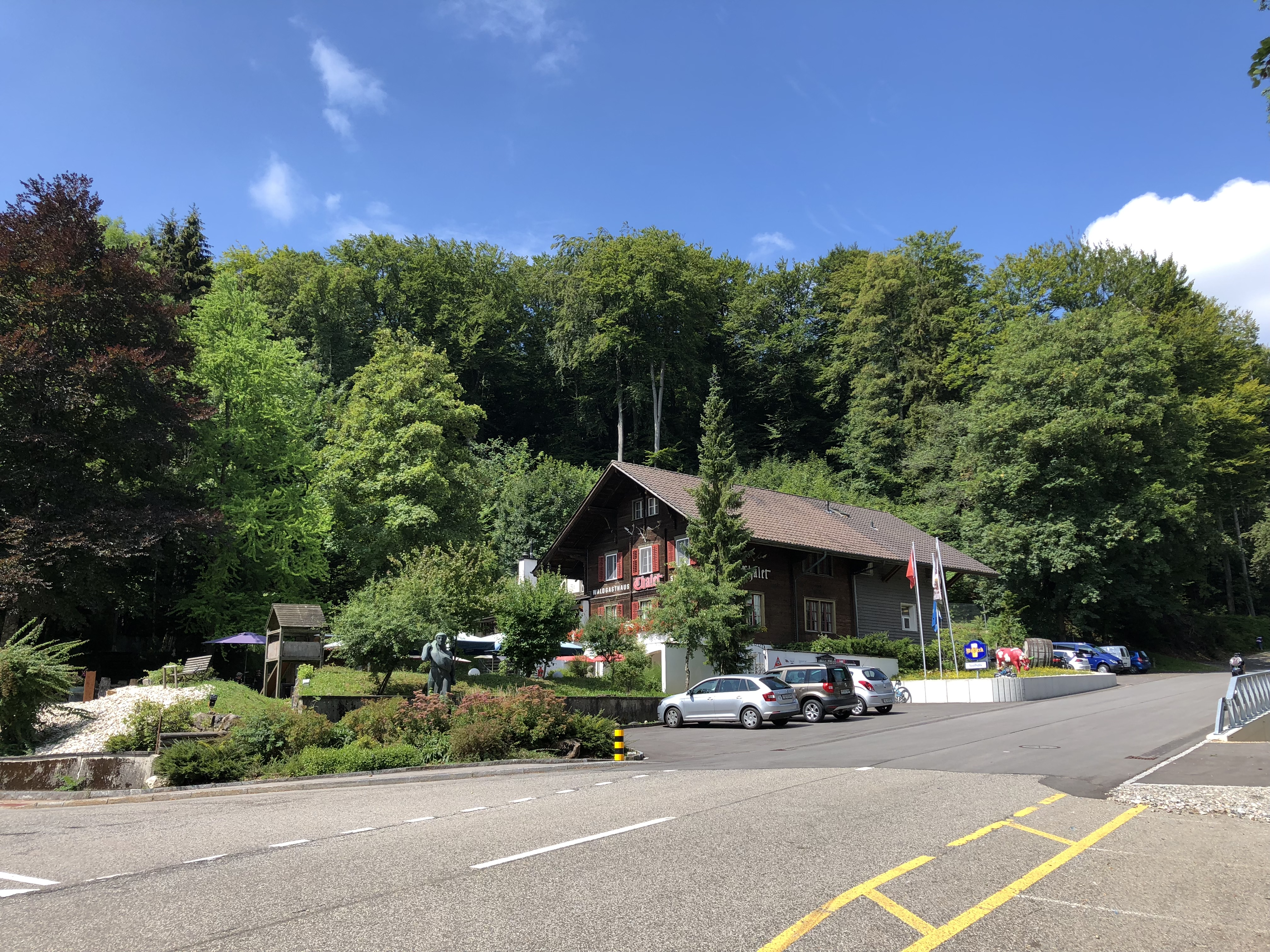
- Salhöhe Pass

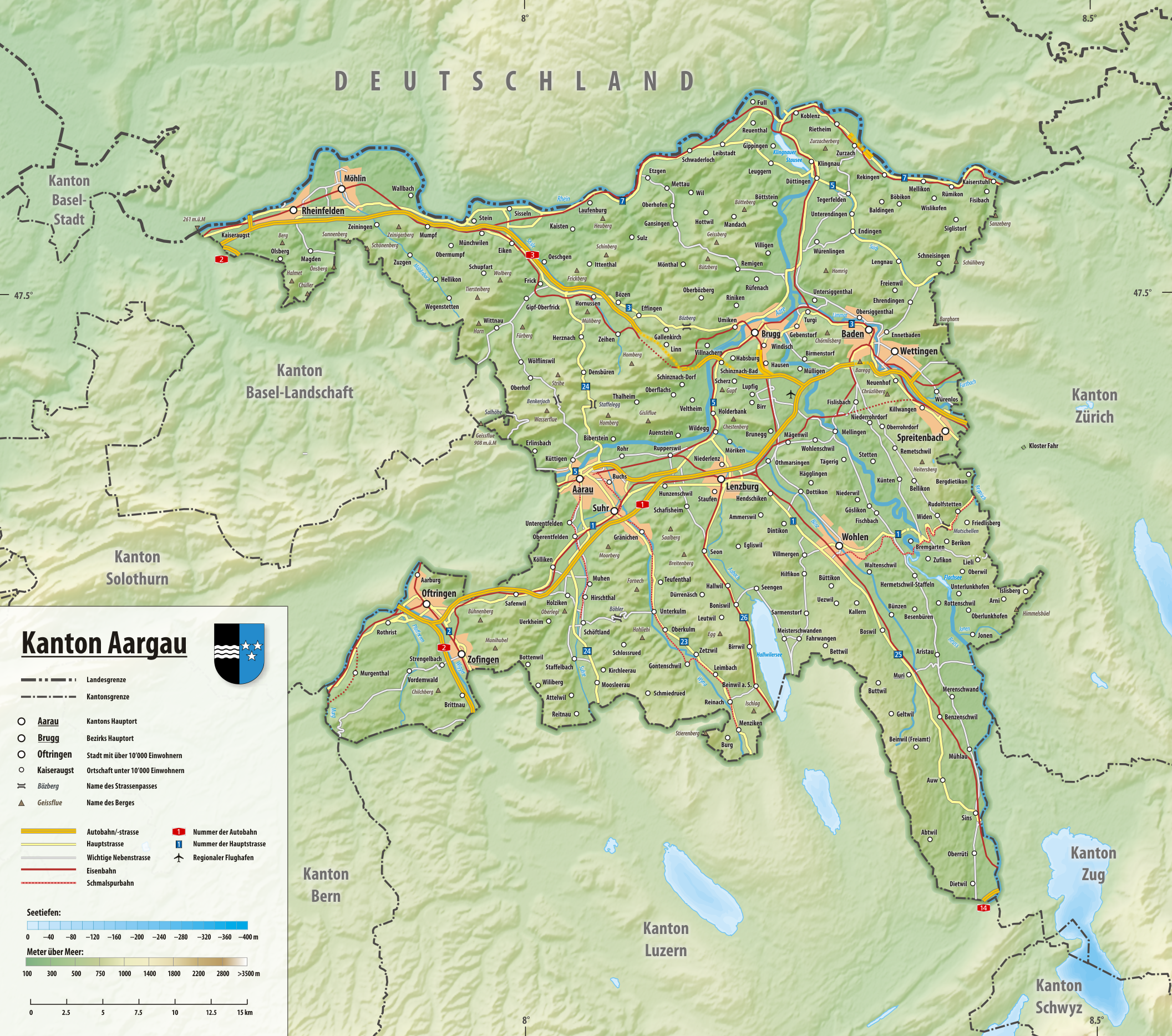
- Location within Canton of Solothurn Location within Canton of Aargau Location within Switzerland
- Elevation: 787 metres (2,582 ft)

Third Approach
- Location: Switzerland
- Range: Jura Mountains
- Coordinates: 47°25′45″N 7°59′09″E

Salhöhe Pass (el. 787 m.) is a mountain pass in the Jura Mountains of Switzerland between Kienberg in the canton of Solothurn and Erlinsbach in the canton of Aargau.

It connects Kienberg in Solothurn and Erlinsbach in Aargau. The pass road has a maximum grade of 9 percent. Although it is the shortest route between Aarau and Basel, traffic over the pass is moderate.

After the Bern citizens had conquered the Unteraargau region in 1415, Salhöhe marked the border between the Old Swiss Confederacy and the Further Austrian possessions of the Habsburg dynasty.

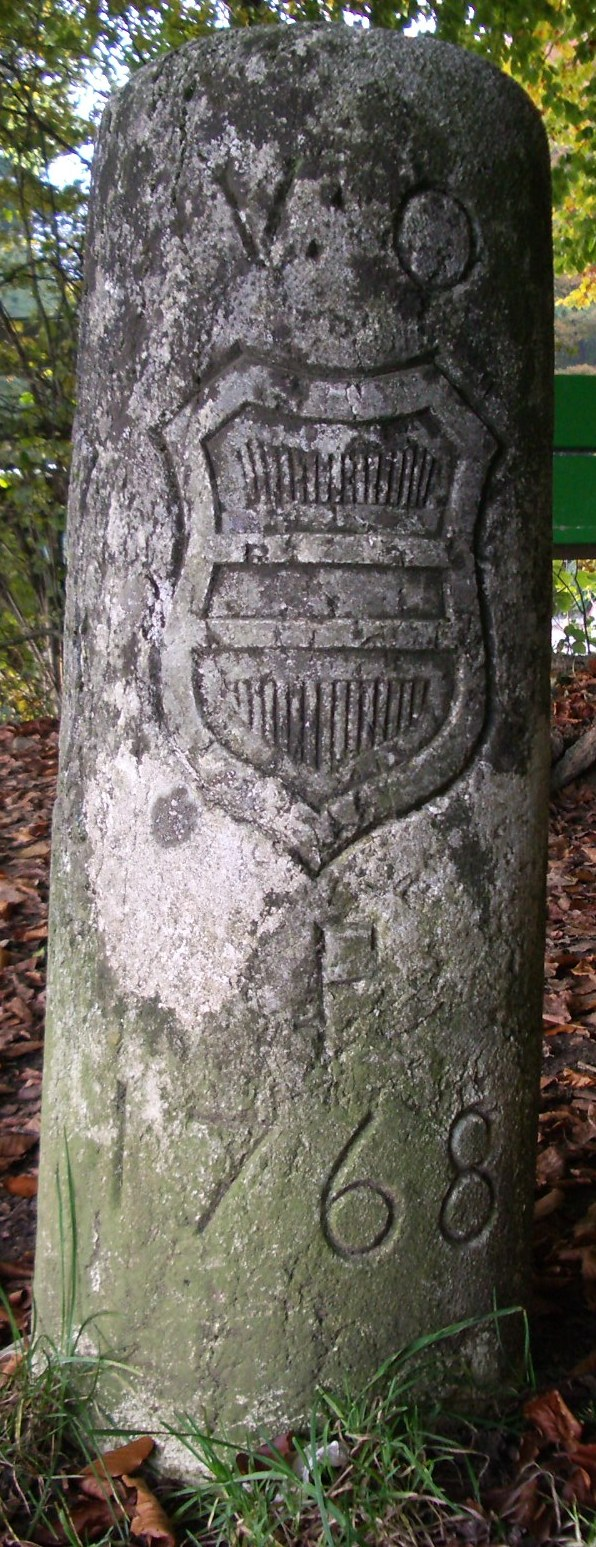
Border stone with the Austrian coat of arms representing Further Austria

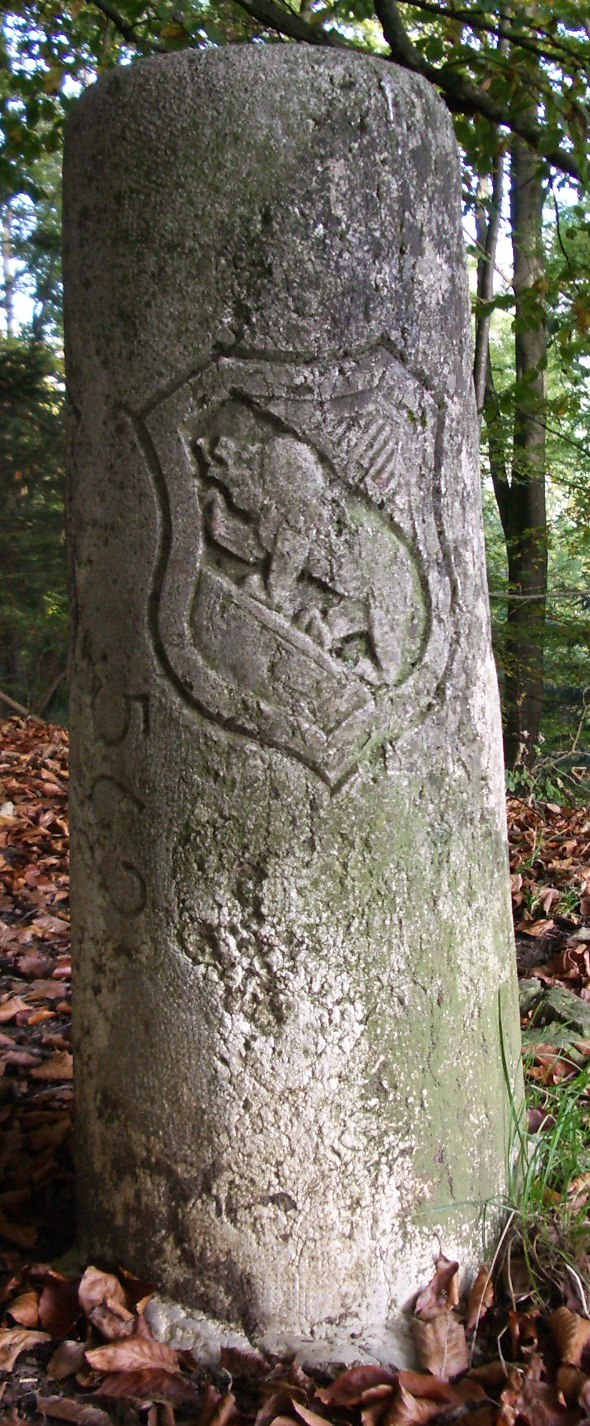
Reverse side with coat of arms of Bern
