= List of Swiss cantons by elevation =

The following list is a comparison of elevation absolutes in Switzerland. Data includes interval measures of highest and lowest elevation for all 26 cantons, with coordinates of the highest. Location names, mean elevation, and the numeric differences between high and low elevations are also provided.

Most of the 26 canton high points are located in the Swiss Alps. Others (with lower altitudes), are located in the Jura Mountains. The 14 lower summits (up to the Säntis) are within the hiking trail network. The ascent of the 11 higher summits involves rock climbing or glacier touring.

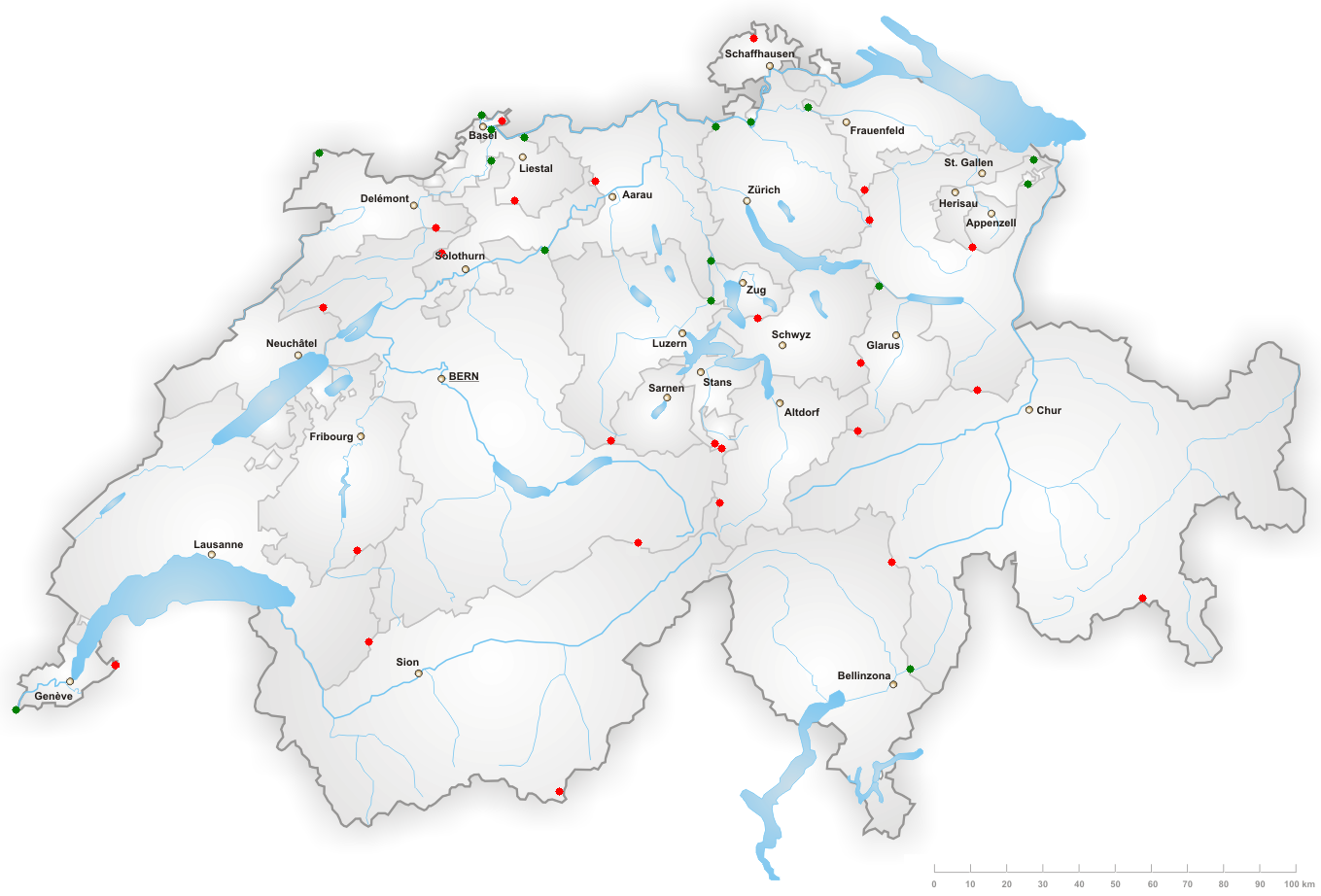
Canton high points are shown as red dots. Low points as expressed with green dots, except in cantons whose lowest elevation are lakes.

Rank	Canton	Highest point	Highest elevation	Coordinates of highest point	Lowest point	Lowest elevation	Mean elevation	Elevation difference
1	Valais	Dufourspitze (Monte Rosa)	4,634 m (15,203 ft)	45°56′12.6″N 7°52′01.4″E	Lake Geneva	372 m (1,220 ft)	2,140 m (7,021 ft)	4,262 m (13,983 ft)
2	Berne	Finsteraarhorn	4,274 m (14,022 ft)	46°32′19″N 8°07′38″E	Aare, Solothurn border	402 m (1,319 ft)	1,198 m (3,930 ft)	3,872 m (12,703 ft)
3	Grisons	Piz Bernina	4,049 m (13,284 ft)	46°23′01″N 9°54′34″E	Moesa, Ticino border	260 m (853 ft)	2,021 m (6,631 ft)	3,789 m (12,431 ft)
4	Uri	Dammastock	3,630 m (11,909 ft)	46°38′28″N 8°25′6″E	Lake Lucerne	434 m (1,424 ft)	1,896 m (6,220 ft)	3,196 m (10,486 ft)
5	Glaris	Tödi	3,614 m (11,857 ft)	46°48′40″N 8°54′53″E	Linth, St. Gallen border	410 m (1,345 ft)	1,589 m (5,213 ft)	3,204 m (10,512 ft)
6	Tessin	Rheinwaldhorn	3,402 m (11,161 ft)	46°29′37″N 9°02′24″E	Lake Maggiore	193 m (633 ft)	1,412 m (4,633 ft)	3,209 m (10,528 ft)
7	St Gall	Ringelspitz	3,248 m (10,656 ft)	46°53′58.95″N 9°20′39″E	Lake Constance	396 m (1,299 ft)	1,000 m (3,281 ft)	2,852 m (9,357 ft)
8	Obwald	Titlis	3,238 m (10,623 ft)	46°46′24″N 8°26′20″E	Lake Lucerne	434 m (1,424 ft)	1,329 m (4,360 ft)	2,804 m (9,199 ft)
9	Vaud	Diablerets	3,210 m (10,531 ft)	46°18′19″N 7°11′24″E	Lake Geneva	372 m (1,220 ft)	827 m (2,713 ft)	2,838 m (9,311 ft)
10	Nidwald	Rotstöckli	2,901 m (9,518 ft)	46°46′39″N 8°25′33″E	Lake Lucerne	434 m (1,424 ft)	1,077 m (3,533 ft)	2,467 m (8,094 ft)
11	Schwyz	Bös Fulen	2,802 m (9,193 ft)	46°58′2″N 8°56′45″E	Lake Zurich	406 m (1,332 ft)	1,082 m (3,550 ft)	2,396 m (7,861 ft)
12	Appenzell Outer-Rhodes	Säntis	2,502 m (8,209 ft)	47°14′57″N 9°20′36″E	Lutzenberg	440 m (1,444 ft)	935 m (3,068 ft)	2,062 m (6,765 ft)
12	Appenzell Inner-Rhodes	Säntis	2,502 m (8,209 ft)	47°14′57″N 9°20′36″E	Appenzell Ausserrhoden and St. Gallen border	560 m (1,837 ft)	1,126 m (3,694 ft)	1,942 m (6,371 ft)
14	Friburg	Vanil Noir	2,389 m (7,838 ft)	46°31′40″N 7°8′20″E	Lake Neuchâtel	429 m (1,407 ft)	856 m (2,808 ft)	1,960 m (6,430 ft)
15	Lucerne	Brienzer Rothorn	2,350 m (7,710 ft)	46°47′18″N 8°02′53″E	Reuss, Zug and Aargau border	406 m (1,332 ft)	777 m (2,549 ft)	1,944 m (6,378 ft)
16	Zoug	Wildspitz	1,580 m (5,184 ft)	47°04′52″N 8°33′45″E	Reuss, Zürich border	388 m (1,273 ft)	651 m (2,136 ft)	1,192 m (3,911 ft)
17	Neuchâtel	Chasseral Ouest	1,552 m (5,092 ft)	47°07′19″N 7°02′07″E	Lake Biel	429 m (1,407 ft)	919 m (3,015 ft)	1,123 m (3,684 ft)
18	Soleure	Hasenmatt	1,445 m (4,741 ft)	47°14′31.44″N 7°27′1.84″E	Birs, Basel-Land border	277 m (909 ft)	630 m (2,067 ft)	1,168 m (3,832 ft)
19	Jura	Mont Raimeux	1,302 m (4,272 ft)	47°18′30″N 7°25′45″E	Allaine, national border	364 m (1,194 ft)	690 m (2,264 ft)	938 m (3,077 ft)
20	Zurich	Schnebelhorn	1,292 m (4,239 ft)	47°19′32.37″N 8°58′46.49″E	Rhine, national border	332 m (1,089 ft)	533 m (1,749 ft)	960 m (3,150 ft)
21	Basle-Country	Hinteri Egg	1,169 m (3,835 ft)	47°22′21″N 7°42′38″E	Birs, Basel-Stadt border	246 m (807 ft)	521 m (1,709 ft)	923 m (3,028 ft)
22	Thurgovia	Hohgrat (Groot)	991 m (3,251 ft)	47°23′N 8°58′E	Thur, Zürich border	370 m (1,214 ft)	495 m (1,624 ft)	621 m (2,037 ft)
23	Schaffhouse	Hagen (Randen)	912 m (2,992 ft)	47°46′N 8°34′E	Rhine, Zürich border	344 m (1,129 ft)	538 m (1,765 ft)	568 m (1,864 ft)
24	Argovia	Geissfluegrat	908 m (2,979 ft)	47°25′22.02″N 7°57′52.42″E	Rhine, national border	260 m (853 ft)	476 m (1,562 ft)	648 m (2,126 ft)
25	Basle-City	St. Chrischona	522 m (1,713 ft)	47°34′23″N 7°40′48″E	Rhine, national border	245 m (804 ft)	295 m (968 ft)	277 m (909 ft)
26	Geneva	Les Arales	516 m (1,693 ft)	46°14′53″N 6°18′32″E	Rhône, national border	332 m (1,089 ft)	419 m (1,375 ft)	184 m (604 ft)

== See also ==
- Extreme points of Switzerland
