= Bös Fulen =

Mountain in Switzerland

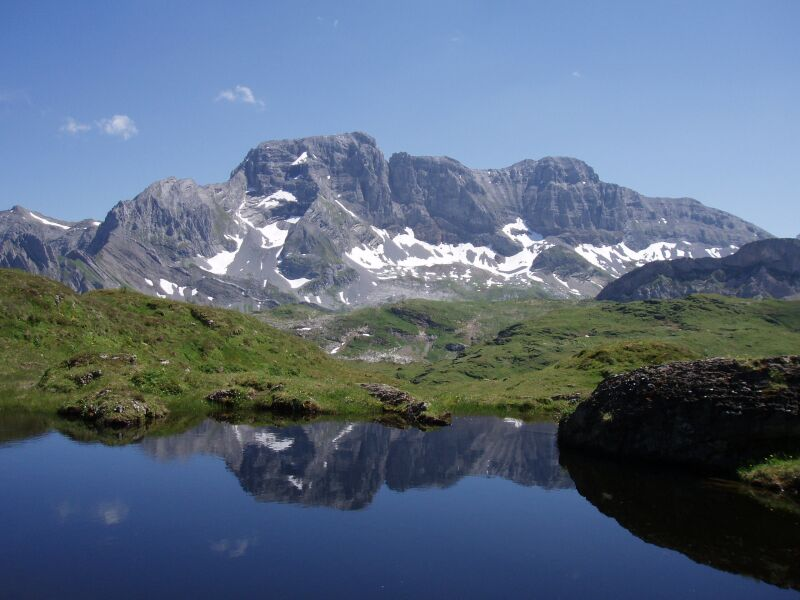
- Bös Fulen from Silberenseeli (lake)

Highest point
- Elevation: 2,802 m (9,193 ft)
- Prominence: 368 m (1,207 ft)
- Parent peak: Glärnisch
- Isolation: 4.3 km (2.7 mi)
- Listing: Canton high point
- Coordinates: 46°58′2″N 8°56′45″E

Naming
- English translation: Bad Fulen
- Language of name: German

Geography
- Location within Switzerland Location within Canton of Glarus Location within Canton of Schwyz
- Country: Switzerland
- Cantons: Glarus / Schwyz
- Parent range: Schwyz Alps
- Topo map: Swiss Federal Office of Topography swisstopo

Geology
- Mountain type: Limestone

The Bös Fulen is a mountain in the Schwyz Alps, located on the border between the cantons of Schwyz (SZ) and Glarus (GL), Switzerland. It overlooks the valleys of Muotathal (SZ) and Linthal (GL). Politically, it is split between the municipalities of Muotathal and Glarus. Braunwald (GL) is the nearest locality.

With 2,802 metres (9,193 ft) above sea level, the Bös Fulen is the highest summit of the canton of Schwyz.

== See also ==
- List of mountains of the canton of Glarus
- List of mountains of the canton of Schwyz
