= Küttiger Rüebli =

Variety of carrot from Switzerland

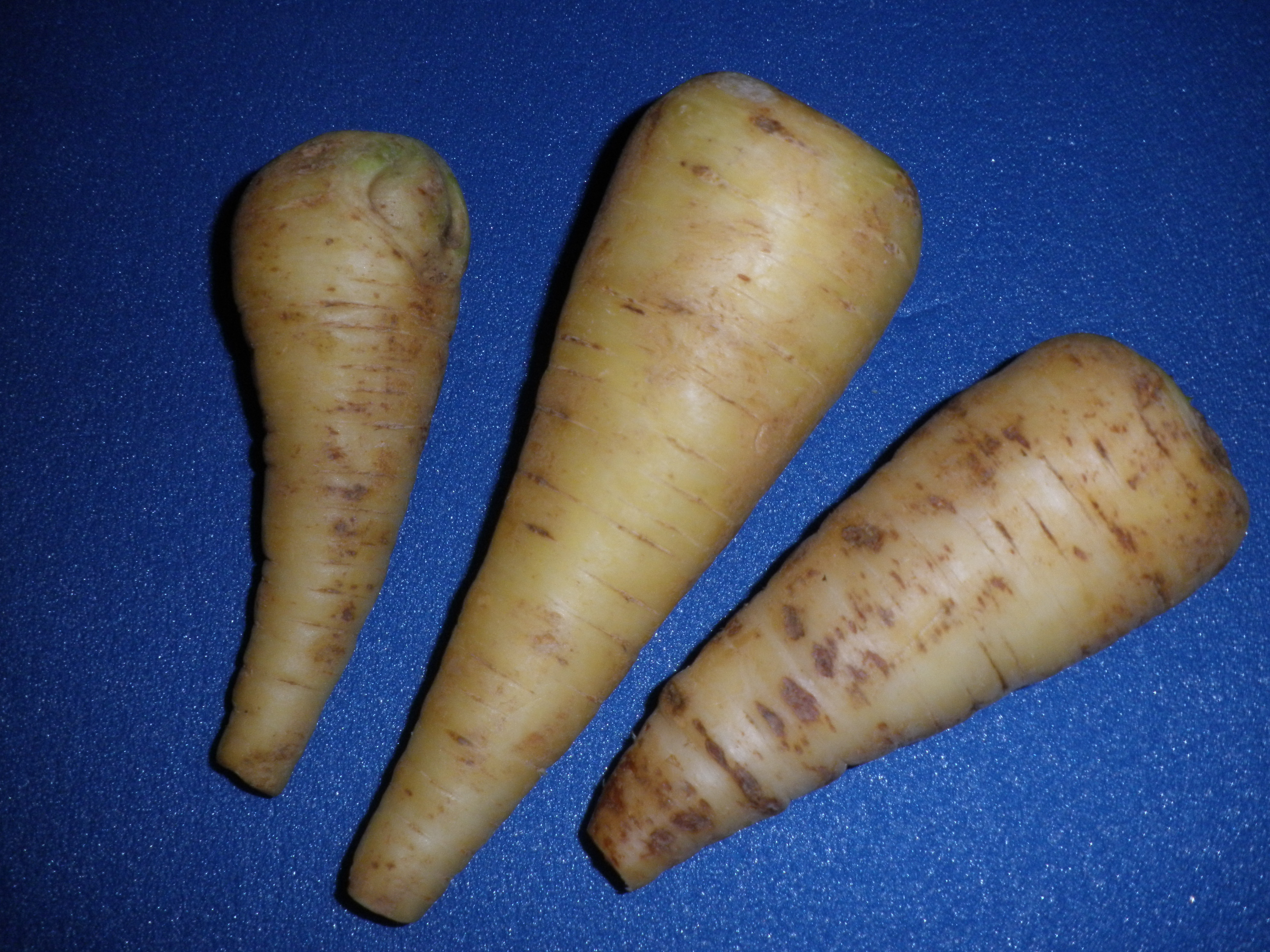
Küttiger Rüebli carrot.

Küttiger Rüebli are an old, robust Swiss carrot variety originally from the Aargau village of Küttigen. They are part of the assortment of ProSpecieRara.

Küttiger Rüebli are relatively large, conical in shape, and white in color. Their taste is aromatic, earthy, and hardly sweet.

== History ==
The village of Küttigen was already known for its vegetables in the 19th century, which were regularly sold at the Aarau weekly market.

In traditional cultivation, the carrots were sown over winter barley in the winter. After the barley was harvested with a scythe, the carrot plants, which were about 15 cm high at that time, were thinned out with a hoe and then had enough space and light until the harvest in October or November. This cultivation method gave them their earlier name "barley carrots."

After Küttiger Rüebli were almost forgotten in the twentieth century, they were "rediscovered" as an independent variety in the 1970s. Since 1978, the Küttigen Women's Farming Association has been taking care of the propagation and preservation of the variety.

== Cultivation ==
Today, Küttiger Rüebli are sown in rows after the Ice Saints and harvested at the end of October or beginning of November. At the carrot market held in Aarau on the first Wednesday in November, about 900 kg are sold, which usually find buyers very quickly. Occasionally, Küttiger Rüebli can also be found in an organic store, at a regional weekly market, or at a major retailer.

The seeds are produced by the Küttigen farmers themselves, with careful selection since there is always a possibility of cross-breeding with wild carrots in the area. The most beautiful medium-sized carrots with a single root are selected. The foliage is cut down to a few millimeters, and the seed carrots are placed in a pit lined with walnut leaves to prevent mice from eating them. In March, the seed carrots are planted in the garden, sprout, and form flowers and seeds. The ripe seed umbels are tied into bundles and hung up to dry until the next spring.

It is reported that Küttiger Rüebli were previously grown together with oats in fields so that both could be harvested simultaneously.

== Culinary use ==
In the past, Küttiger Rüebli were sold as horse feed as far as Zurich.

In rural areas, the carrots were often considered poor people's food. They were used to stretch potatoes in a stew. They were pickled in the village as sauerkraut, and eaten with blood and liver sausages or with apple compote during the winter. Another method of preservation was drying, where the cooked carrots were cut into sticks and then dried on the stove.

Today, Küttiger Rüebli are steamed in bite-sized pieces and seasoned with salt, pepper, garlic, and onions as a specialty. Together with green bacon and small potatoes, they make a stew.
