= Küttigen =

- Municipality
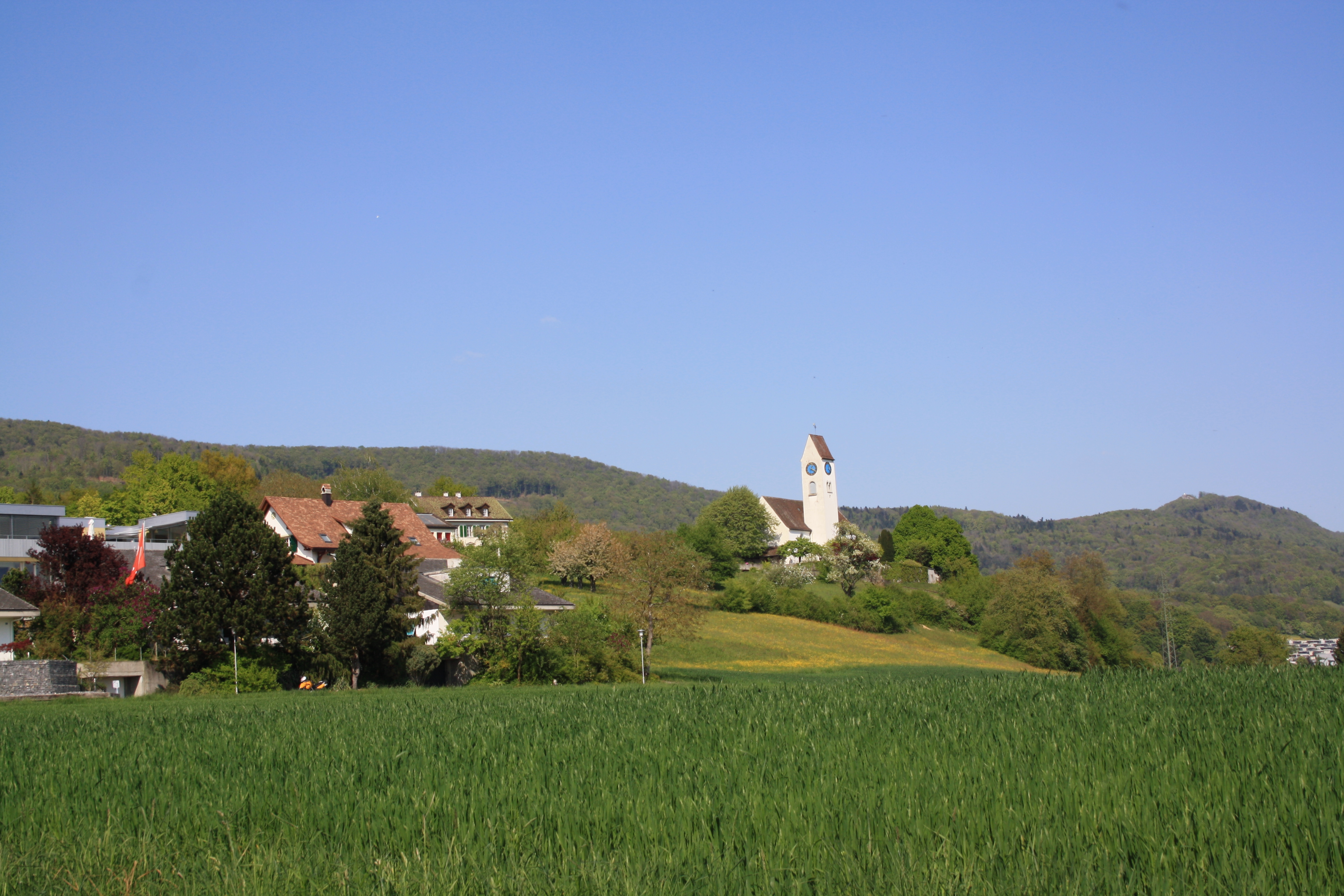

- Flag Coat of arms
- Location of Küttigen
- Location within Switzerland Location within Canton of Aargau
- Coordinates: 47°25′N 8°3′E
- Country: Switzerland
- Canton: Aargau
- District: Aarau

Area
  - Total: 11.89 km^{2} (4.59 sq mi)
- Elevation: 408 m (1,339 ft)

Population (December 2020)
  - Total: 6,295
  - Density: 529.4/km^{2} (1,371/sq mi)
- Time zone: UTC+01:00 (CET)
  - Summer (DST): UTC+02:00 (CEST)
- Postal code: 5024
- SFOS number: 4008
- ISO 3166 code: CH-AG
- Surrounded by: Aarau, Biberstein, Densbüren, Erlinsbach, Oberhof, Rohr, Thalheim
- Website: www.kuettigen.ch

Küttigen (German pronunciation: [ˈkʏtɪɡn̩]) is a municipality in the district of Aarau of the canton of Aargau in Switzerland.

== History ==
Küttigen is first mentioned in 1036 as Chutingen though this comes from a 14th Century copy of the original. In 1045 it was mentioned as Chutingun.

== Geography ==
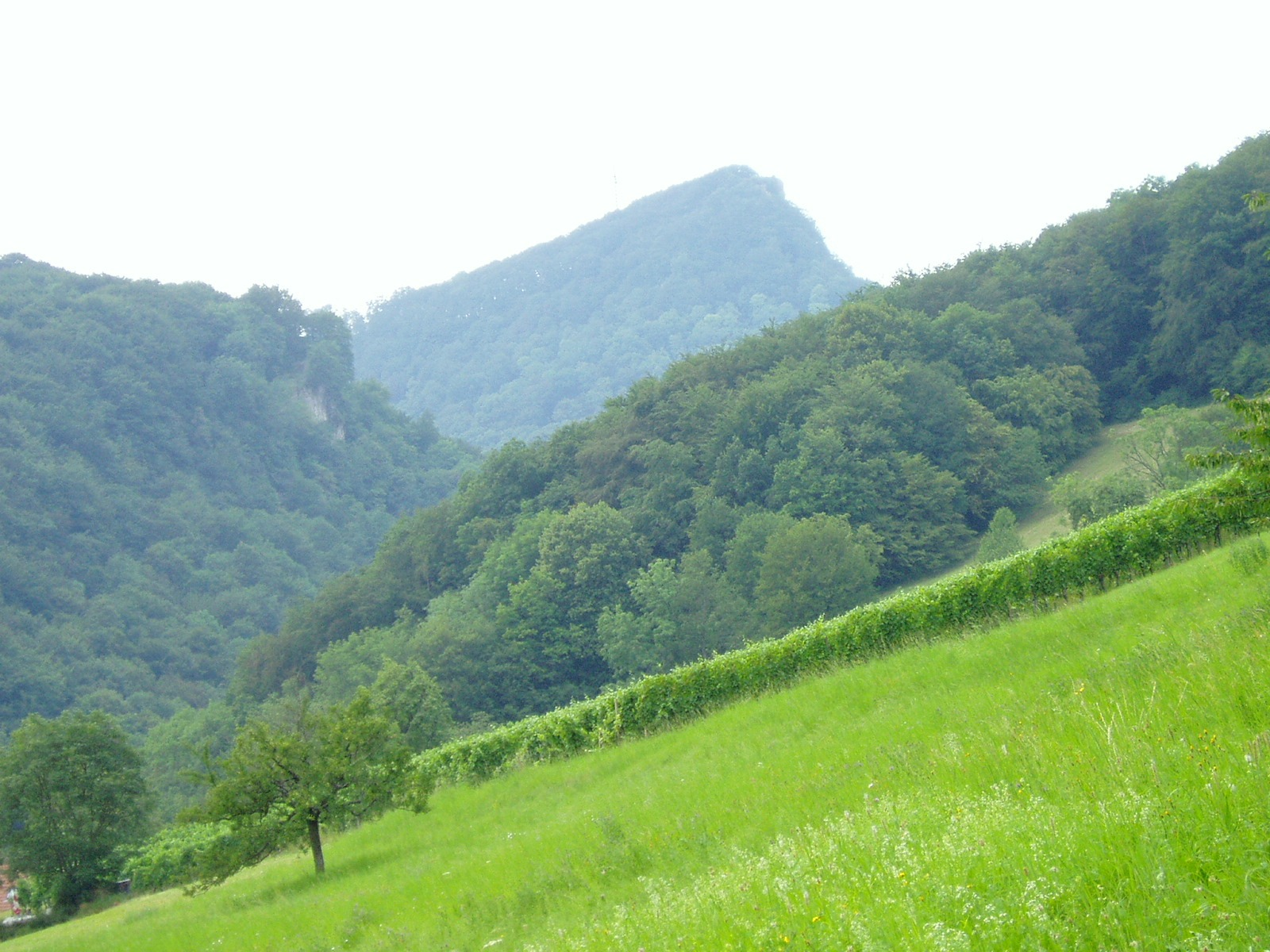
Wasserfluh mountain near Küttigen

Aerial view (1953)

Küttigen has an area, as of 2006, of 11.9 km^{2} (4.6 sq mi). Of this area, 36% is used for agricultural purposes, while 50.4% is forested. Of the rest of the land, 13% is settled (buildings or roads) and the remainder (0.6%) is non-productive (rivers or lakes).

The municipality is located in the Aarau district between the Aare river and the Jura Mountains. It consists of the village of Küttigen and the hamlet of Horen.

== Coat of arms ==
The blazon of the municipal coat of arms is Per bend Sable a Bend sinister Argent and Or.

== Demographics ==
Küttigen has a population (as of 31 December 2020) of 6,295. As of 2008, 14.9% of the population was made up of foreign nationals. Over the last 10 years the population has grown at a rate of 8.2%. Most of the population (as of 2000) speaks German (89.4%), with Italian being second most common (2.5%) and Albanian being third ( 2.1%).

The age distribution, as of 2008, in Küttigen is; 532 children or 9.8% of the population are between 0 and 9 years old and 600 teenagers or 11.1% are between 10 and 19. Of the adult population, 591 people or 10.9% of the population are between 20 and 29 years old. 757 people or 14.0% are between 30 and 39, 942 people or 17.4% are between 40 and 49, and 728 people or 13.5% are between 50 and 59. The senior population distribution is 672 people or 12.4% of the population are between 60 and 69 years old, 370 people or 6.8% are between 70 and 79, there are 186 people or 3.4% who are between 80 and 89, and there are 25 people or 0.5% who are 90 and older.

As of 2000, there were 185 homes with 1 or 2 persons in the household, 1,014 homes with 3 or 4 persons in the household, and 879 homes with 5 or more persons in the household. The average number of people per household was 2.28 individuals. In 2008 there were 1,122 single family homes (or 43.4% of the total) out of a total of 2,586 homes and apartments.

In the 2007 federal election the most popular party was the SVP which received 30.1% of the vote. The next three most popular parties were the SP (22%), the FDP (15.9%) and the Green Party (9.4%).

The entire Swiss population is generally well educated. In Küttigen about 79.6% of the population (between ages 25 and 64) have completed either non-mandatory upper secondary education or additional higher education (either university or a Fachhochschule). Of the school age population (in the 2008/2009 school year), there are 382 students attending primary school, there are 167 students attending secondary school in the municipality.

The historical population is given in the following table:

Historical population
Year	Pop.	±%
1764	682	—
1803	1,078	+58.1%
1850	1,847	+71.3%
1900	2,018	+9.3%
1910	2,167	+7.4%
1950	2,508	+15.7%
2000	5,025	+100.4%

== Economy ==
As of 2007, Küttigen had an unemployment rate of 1.66%. As of 2005, there were 98 people employed in the primary economic sector and about 23 businesses involved in this sector. 351 people are employed in the secondary sector and there are 39 businesses in this sector. 607 people are employed in the tertiary sector, with 130 businesses in this sector.

As of 2000 there was a total of 2,634 workers who lived in the municipality. Of these, 2,089 or about 79.3% of the residents worked outside Küttigen while 491 people commuted into the municipality for work. There were a total of 1,036 jobs (of at least 6 hours per week) in the municipality.

== Religion ==
From the 2000 census, 1,213 or 24.1% are Roman Catholic, while 2,724 or 54.2% belonged to the Swiss Reformed Church. Of the rest of the population, there are 21 individuals (or about 0.42% of the population) who belong to the Christian Catholic faith.

== See also ==
- Küttiger Rüebli
