= Erlinsbach, Aargau =

Erlinsbach
- Municipality
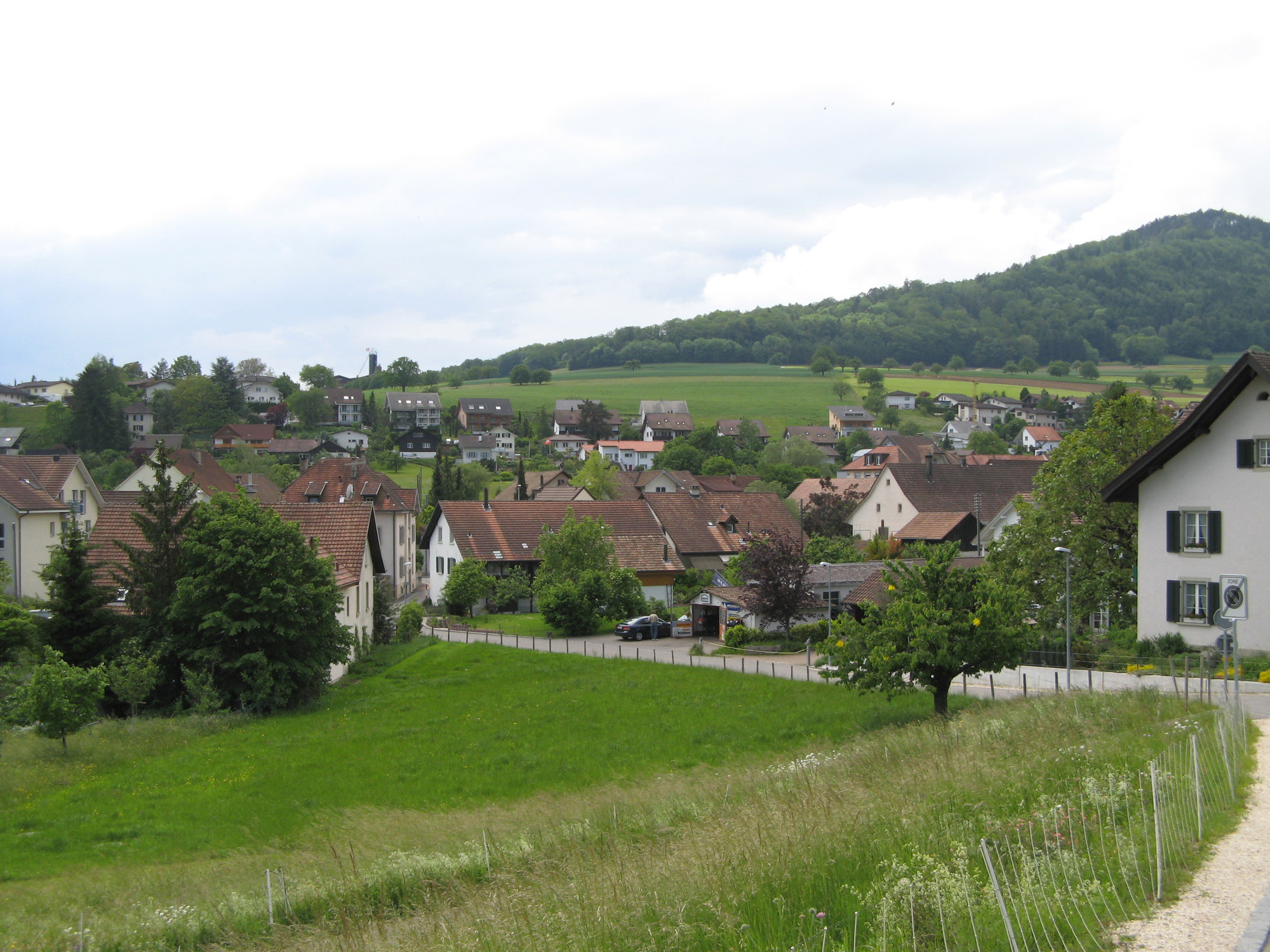

- Flag Coat of arms
- Location of Erlinsbach
- Location within Switzerland Location within Canton of Aargau
- Coordinates: 47°24′N 8°01′E
- Country: Switzerland
- Canton: Aargau
- District: Aarau

Government
  - Mayor: Max Tschiri

Area
  - Total: 9.87 km^{2} (3.81 sq mi)
- Elevation: 430 m (1,410 ft)

Population (December 2020)
  - Total: 4,400
  - Density: 450/km^{2} (1,200/sq mi)
- Time zone: UTC+01:00 (CET)
  - Summer (DST): UTC+02:00 (CEST)
- Postal code: 5018
- SFOS number: 4005
- ISO 3166 code: CH-AG
- Surrounded by: Aarau, Kienberg (SO), Küttigen, Niedererlinsbach (SO), Obererlinsbach (SO), Oberhof
- Website: www.erlinsbach.ch

Erlinsbach is a municipality in the district of Aarau of the canton of Aargau in Switzerland.

Aerial view (1953)

== History ==
Erlinsbach is first mentioned in 1173 as Arnlesbah. In 1220 it was mentioned as Erndespah and in the 14th century it was known as Erlispach.

During the Middle Ages the hamlets of Obererlinsbach and Niedererlinsbach were part of Erlinsbach. They are now in the Canton of Solothurn. In the 14th century, the hamlet of Edliswil was abandoned, however its exact location is currently unknown. In the 15th or 16th century, the hamlet of Hard was founded.

== Geography ==
Erlinsbach has an area, as of 2006, of 9.9 km^{2} (3.8 sq mi). Of this area, 34.7% is used for agricultural purposes, while 53.8% is forested. Of the rest of the land, 10.6% is settled (buildings or roads) and the remainder (0.9%) is non-productive (rivers or lakes).

The municipality is located in the Aarau district between the Aare river and Jura Mountains on the border with the Canton of Solothurn. It is near the Salhöhe Pass, a regionally important route over the Jura Mountains. It consists of the village of Erlinsbach and the hamlet of Hard.

== Coat of arms ==
The blazon of the municipal coat of arms is Divided by Bend wavy Argent in Or a Bend sinister Sable and Azure a Mullet of Five of the first.

== Demographics ==
Erlinsbach has a population (as of 31 December 2020) of 4,400. As of 2008, 14.9% of the population was made up of foreign nationals. Over the last 10 years the population has grown at a rate of 8.1%. Most of the population (as of 2000) speaks German (90.3%), with Serbo-Croatian being second most common (2.7%) and Italian being third (1.7%).

The age distribution, as of 2008, in Erlinsbach is; 359 children or 10.3% of the population are between 0 and 9 years old and 384 teenagers or 11.0% are between 10 and 19. Of the adult population, 369 people or 10.6% of the population are between 20 and 29 years old. 391 people or 11.2% are between 30 and 39, 588 people or 16.9% are between 40 and 49, and 496 people or 14.2% are between 50 and 59. The senior population distribution is 444 people or 12.8% of the population are between 60 and 69 years old, 280 people or 8.0% are between 70 and 79, there are 147 people or 4.2% who are between 80 and 89, and there are 23 people or 0.7% who are 90 and older.

As of 2000, there were 57 homes with 1 or 2 persons in the household, 644 homes with 3 or 4 persons in the household, and 542 homes with 5 or more persons in the household. The average number of people per household was 2.43 individuals. In 2008 there were 761 single family homes (or 50.4% of the total) out of a total of 1,509 homes and apartments.

In the 2007 federal election the most popular party was the SVP which received 36.2% of the vote. The next three most popular parties were the FDP (18.2%), the SP (16.1%) and the CVP (9.3%).

The entire Swiss population is generally well educated. In Erlinsbach about 75.6% of the population (between age 25 and 64) have completed either non-mandatory upper secondary education or additional higher education (either university or a Fachhochschule). Of the school age population (in the 2008/2009 school year), there are 468 students attending primary school, there are 175 students attending secondary school in the municipality.

The historical population is given in the following table:

Historical population
Year	Pop.	±%
1764	433	—
1803	523	+20.8%
1850	930	+77.8%
1900	1,161	+24.8%
1950	1,679	+44.6%
1970	2,690	+60.2%
2000	3,286	+22.2%
2005	3,483	+6.0%

== Economy ==
As of 2007, Erlinsbach had an unemployment rate of 1.42%. As of 2005, there were 58 people employed in the primary economic sector and about 20 businesses involved in this sector. 122 people are employed in the secondary sector and there are 24 businesses in this sector. 648 people are employed in the tertiary sector, with 68 businesses in this sector.

As of 2000 there was a total of 1,677 workers who lived in the municipality. Of these, 1,355 or about 80.8% of the residents worked outside Erlinsbach while 373 people commuted into the municipality for work. There were a total of 695 jobs (of at least 6 hours per week) in the municipality.

== Religion ==
From the 2000 census, 957 or 29.1% are Roman Catholic, while 1,593 or 48.5% belonged to the Swiss Reformed Church. Of the rest of the population, there are 12 individuals (or about 0.37% of the population) who belong to the Christian Catholic faith.
