= Basel-Landschaft =

Canton of Switzerland

Canton of Basel-Landschaft Kanton Basel-Landschaft (German) Canton of Basel-Country
- Canton
- Flag Coat of arms Brandmark
- Interactive map of Canton of Basel-Landschaft
- Coordinates: 47°7′N 7°44′E
- Country: Switzerland
- Capital: Liestal
- Largest city: Allschwil
- Subdivisions: 86 municipalities, 5 districts

Government
  - President: Isaac Reber
  - Executive: Regierungsrat (5)
  - Legislative: Landrat (90)

Area
  - Total: 517.67 km^{2} (199.87 sq mi)

Population (June 2021)
  - Total: 292,955
  - Density: 565.91/km^{2} (1,465.7/sq mi)

GDP
  - Total: CHF 20.567 billion (2020)
  - Per capita: CHF 70,866 (2020)
- ISO 3166 code: CH-BL
- Highest point: 1,169 m (3,835 ft): Hinteri Egg
- Lowest point: 246 m (807 ft): confluence of the river Birs with the Rhine, at Birsfelden
- Joined: 1501
- Languages: German
- Website: www.bl.ch

Canton of Basel-Landschaft or Basel-Country, informally known as Baselland or Baselbiet (/ˌbɑːzəl ˈlændʃɑːft/; German: Kanton Basel-Landschaft [ˈkantɔn ˌbaːzl̩ ˈlantʃaft]; Romansh: Chantun Basilea-Champagna; French: Canton de Bâle-Campagne [bɑl.kɑ̃.paɲ]; Italian: Canton Basilea Campagna), is one of the 26 cantons forming the Swiss Confederation. It is composed of five districts and its capital city is Liestal. It is traditionally considered a "half-canton", the other half being Basel-Stadt, its urban counterpart.

Basel-Landschaft is one of the northernmost cantons of Switzerland. It lies essentially south of the Rhine and north of the Jura Mountains. The canton shares borders with the canton of Basel-Stadt to the north, the canton of Aargau to the east, the canton of Solothurn to the south and the canton of Jura to the west. It shares international borders as well with France and Germany to the north.

Together with Basel-Stadt, Basel-Landschaft was part of the canton of Basel, which joined the Old Swiss Confederacy in 1501. Political quarrels and armed conflict led to the partition of the canton in 1833.

== History ==
Basel-Landschaft, together with Basel-Stadt, formed the historic Canton of Basel until they separated following the uprising of 1833 (Battle of the Hülftenschanz near Frenkendorf).

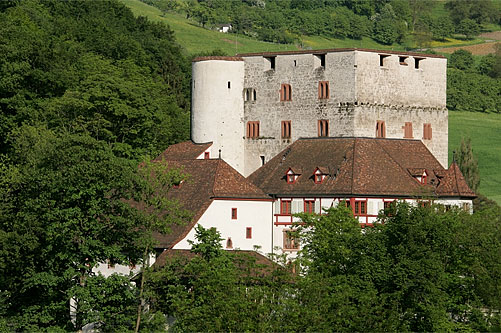
Castle of Angenstein in Duggingen

In Roman times, the area of Basel was a centre of Roman activity. There are well-preserved remains at the site of Augusta Raurica in the canton of Basel-Landschaft. Around 200 AD there were about 20,000 people living in this city, now part of the much smaller Augst. The remains are on display in an open-air museum. The museum attracts over 140,000 visitors per year. Many of these visitors are schoolchildren from other parts of Switzerland. The site of Augusta Raurica includes the best-preserved amphitheatre north of the Alps, and a reconstructed Roman villa.

The lands of the canton Basel-Landschaft are part of the lands acquired by the city of Basel. Until the end of the 16th century, most of the canton's land belonged to the city of Basel. After Napoleon's visit in 1798, the country achieved equality with the city. The country was economically dependent on the city, most probably because of the cost and difficulty in transporting agricultural goods to further markets, the financing of land transactions and crop production by city-based merchants. Low levels of education and literacy in the agricultural areas of Europe was typical in that era. The best students would be sponsored and sent away for higher learning. The city of Basel remained the cultural and economic centre of both Basel half cantons until then. Castles and residences of Basel merchants dominated much of the landscape in Basel-Landschaft.

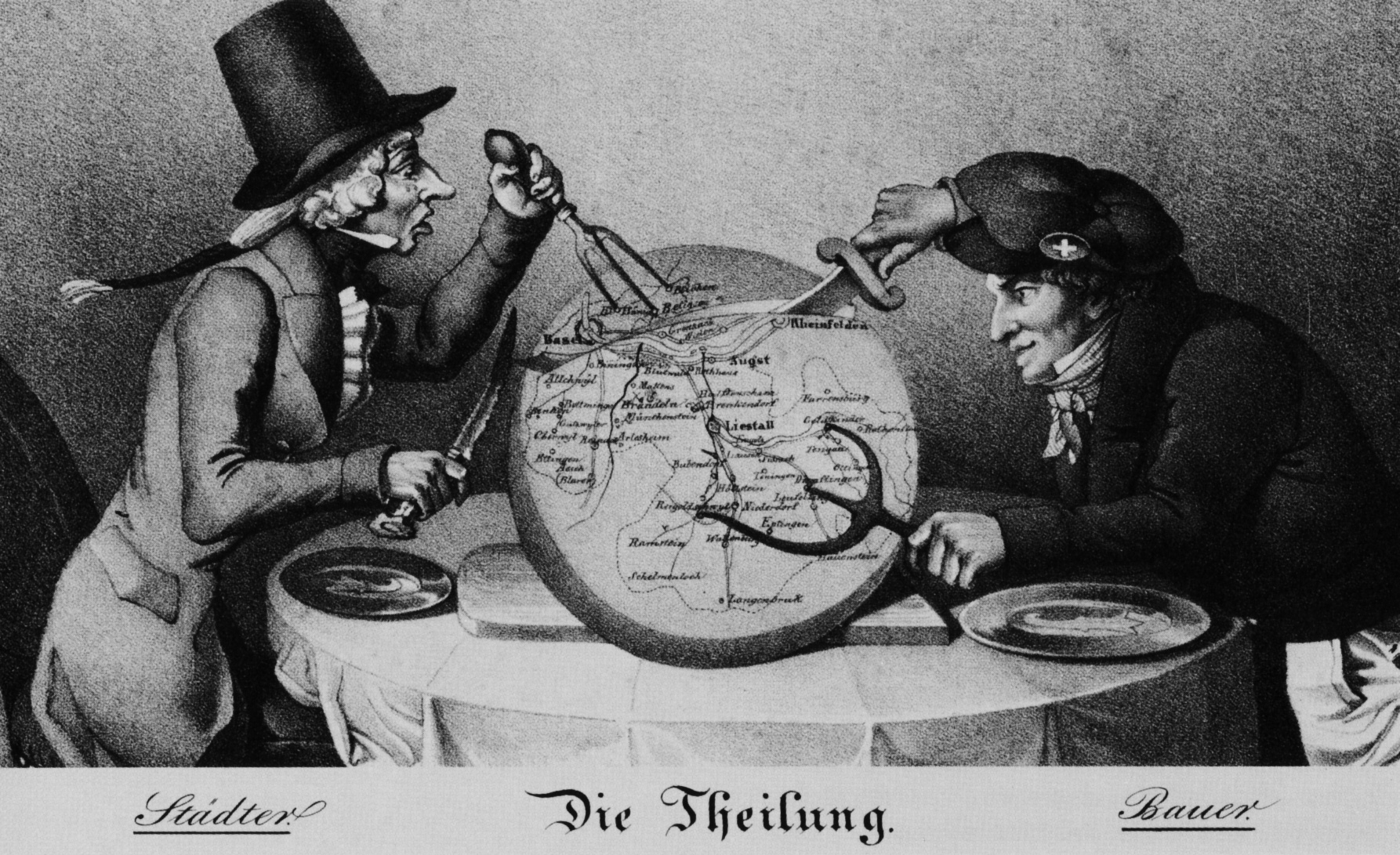
Caricature of the division of Basel, 1833

After 1830 there were political quarrels and armed conflict in the canton of Basel. Some of these were concerned with the rights of the population in the agricultural areas. They ultimately led to the separation of the canton Basel-Landschaft from the city of Basel on 26 August 1833. Since then, there has been a movement for reunification. This movement gained momentum after 1900 when many parts of Basel-Landschaft became industrialized. The two half cantons agreed in principle to merge, but in 1969 the people of Basel-Landschaft voted down a referendum on this proposal in favour of retaining their independence. It is thought that the closing economic gap between the two cantons was the main reason why the population changed their attitude.

That vote was not the end of a close relationship between the two Basels. The two half cantons have since signed a number of agreements to co-operate. The contribution of Basel-Landschaft to the University of Basel since 1976 is just one example.

== Geography ==
The canton of Basel-Landschaft lies in the northwestern corner of Switzerland just south of the canton of Basel-Stadt.

With a few exceptions, it includes the towns of the Laufental along the river Birs, the Birseck and the Leimental, as well as the towns along the Ergolz and its tributaries. The shape of the canton is very irregular, and its borders cut across several towns.

In terms of size, it is one of the smaller cantons of Switzerland (18th of 26). However, it is number 10 in terms of population.

Basel-Landschaft borders on the east and north with the canton of Aargau and the Rhine, which forms the border with Germany (state of Baden-Württemberg). On the northwest, it borders with France (department of Haut-Rhin).

On the south, it borders on the canton of Solothurn, with a few exclaves of that canton within its western area. In the extreme southwest, it borders on the canton of Jura.

The Jura mountain chain traverses the canton. The rivers Ergolz and Birs drain the lands of the canton.

The thirty rivers of Baselland are:

- Ergolz
- Eibach
- Homburger Bach
- Diegter Bach
- Walibach
- Vordere Frenke
- Fluebach
- Hintere Frenke
- Frenke
- Orisbach
- Röserenbach
- Arisdorfer Bach
- Violenbach
- Wintersinger Bach
- Buuser Bach
- Magdener Bach
- Hemmiker Bach
- Rickenbächlein
- Rhein
- Birsig
- Binnbach
- Marchbach
- Birs
- Seebach
- Chastelbach
- Ibach
- Dürrbach
- Lüssel
- Wahlenbach
- Lützel

== Politics ==
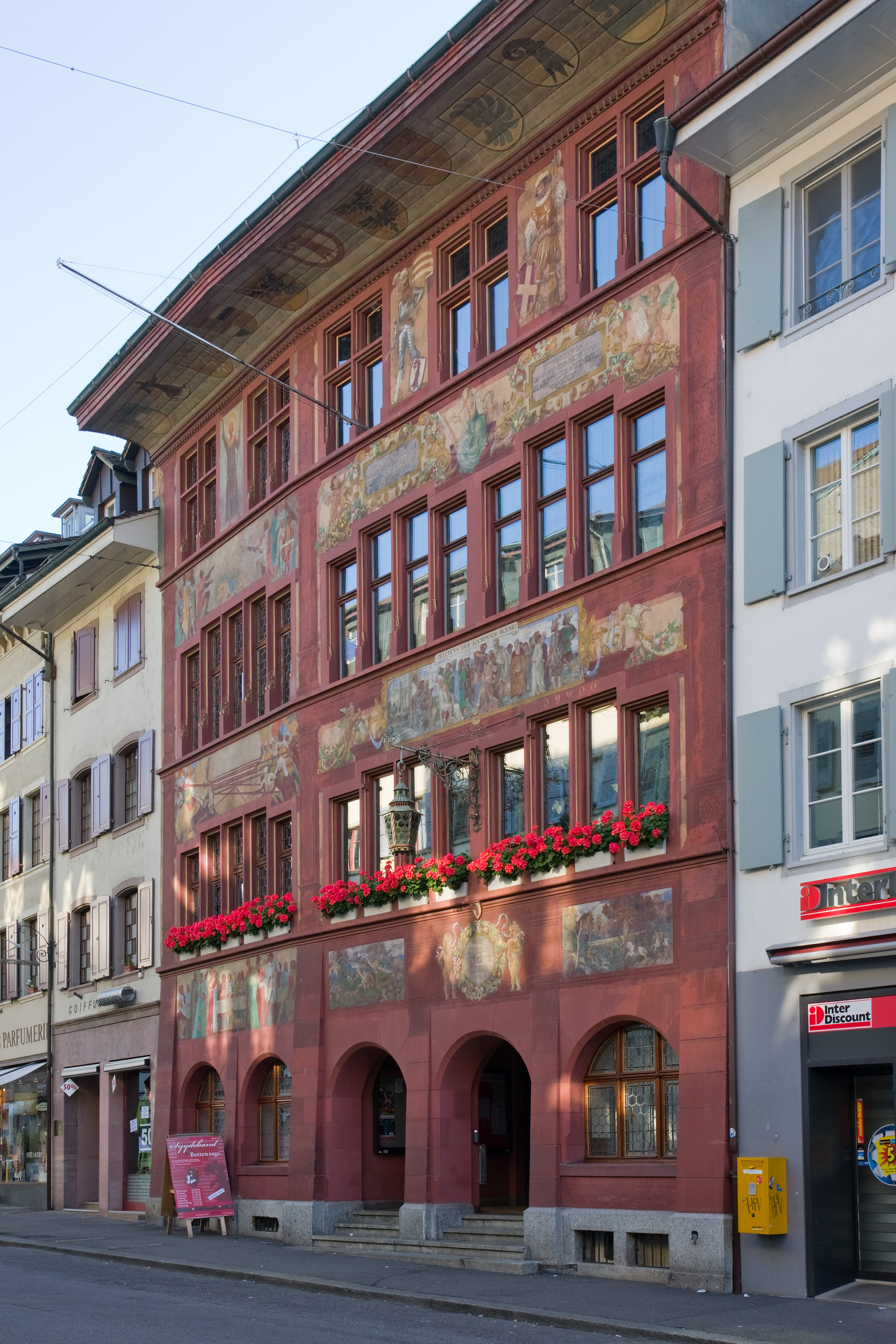
Former town hall in Liestal, the cantonal capital.

Since the decision to remain independent from Basel-Stadt in 1969 there have been a number of requests in the parliament for Basel-Landschaft to become a full canton. In 1988 the canton of Basel-Landschaft had this aim written into its constitution. The aim remains to change the Swiss constitution to recognize the two cantons of Basel as full members.

=== Federal election results ===
Percentage of the total vote per party in the canton in the Federal Elections 1971-2015
Party	Ideology	1971	1975	1979	1983	1987	1991	1995	1999	2003	2007	2011	2015	2019	2023
SVP/UDC	Swiss nationalism	11.8	10.7	10.6	11.2	12.0	12.3	10.8	18.0	26.5	28.5	26.9	29.8	25.1	28.9
SP/PS	Social democracy	28.2	30.3	31.4	32.5	22.8	24.4	25.3	23.3	24.7	25.2	24.4	22.2	21.8	24.7
FDP.The Liberals^{a}	Classical liberalism	23.0	23.9	26.7	25.1	22.0	24.8	19.6	22.1	19.9	17.0	11.5	15.8	16.5	14.2
The Centre	Christian democracy	*	*	*	*	*	*	*	*	*	*	*	*	*	10.6
GPS/PES	Green politics	*	*	*	1.9	6.9	11.0	9.5	9.2	12.6	13.8	13.6	14.2	18.0	10.0
GLP/PVL	Green liberalism	*	*	*	*	*	*	*	*	*	*	5.0	2.7	5.3	7.0
EVP/PEV	Christian democracy	*	*	3.9	*	3.2	2.6	1.7	2.4	2.7	2.8	3.3	2.2	3.5	2.6
EDU/UDF	Christian right	*	*	*	*	*	*	0.6	*	*	0.5	*	0.4	*	0.5
CVP/PDC/PPD/PCD	Christian democracy	13.3	13.3	11.5	10.8	12.3	11.6	11.7	12.0	10.0	11.4	8.2	9.1	8.5	* ^{d}
BDP/PBD	Conservatism	*	*	*	*	*	*	*	*	*	*	6.4	2.8	1.2	* ^{d}
SD/DS	National conservatism	10.0	5.6	*	3.9	6.2	9.1	11.0	10.1	2.7	0.8	0.7	*	*	*
FPS/PSL	Right-wing populism	*	*	*	*	2.6	4.3	1.3	0.3	0.2	*	*	*	*	*
Ring of Independents	Social liberalism	13.8	11.2	7.8	4.4	2.7	* ^{b}	1.3	*	*	*	*	*	*	*
POCH	Progressivism	*	3.3	7.1	7.2	7.4	^{c}	*	*	*	*	*	*	*	*
FGA	Feminist	*	*	*	3.0	2.0	^{c}	*	*	*	*	*	*	*	*
PdA/PST-POP/PC/PSL	Socialism	*	1.8	1.0	*	*	*	*	*	*	*	*	*	*	*
Other		*	*	*	*	*	*	7.1	2.5	0.8	*	*	0.8	*	1.5
Voter participation %		51.8	48.3	43.0	49.3	46.8	44.5	41.3	41.8	44.2	49.3	48.2	46.8		

^a FDP before 2009, FDP.The Liberals after 2009
^b "*" indicates that the party was not on the ballot in this canton.
^c Part of the GPS
^d CVP and BDP merged to form The Centre party.

== Political subdivisions ==
The nine municipalities of the Arlesheim district used to belong to the diocese of Basel. In 1792 French troops occupied the district and in 1793 the lands were annexed by France, which explains the linguistic switch of the Family of the House of Basel's name from "von Basel" to "de Bâle", since Arlesheim holds their manor. In 1815 at the Congress of Vienna the district joined Basel.

The district of Laufental has the same history as that of Arlesheim. The important difference is that in 1815 Laufental joined Bern rather than Basel. When the canton of Jura was created in 1979, the district of Laufental became an enclave of the canton of Bern. It was allowed self- determination and in 1980 the people decided to join the canton of Basel-Landschaft. This led to Laufental joining the canton of Basel-Landschaft on 1 January 1994 after a lengthy administrative process.

=== Districts ===
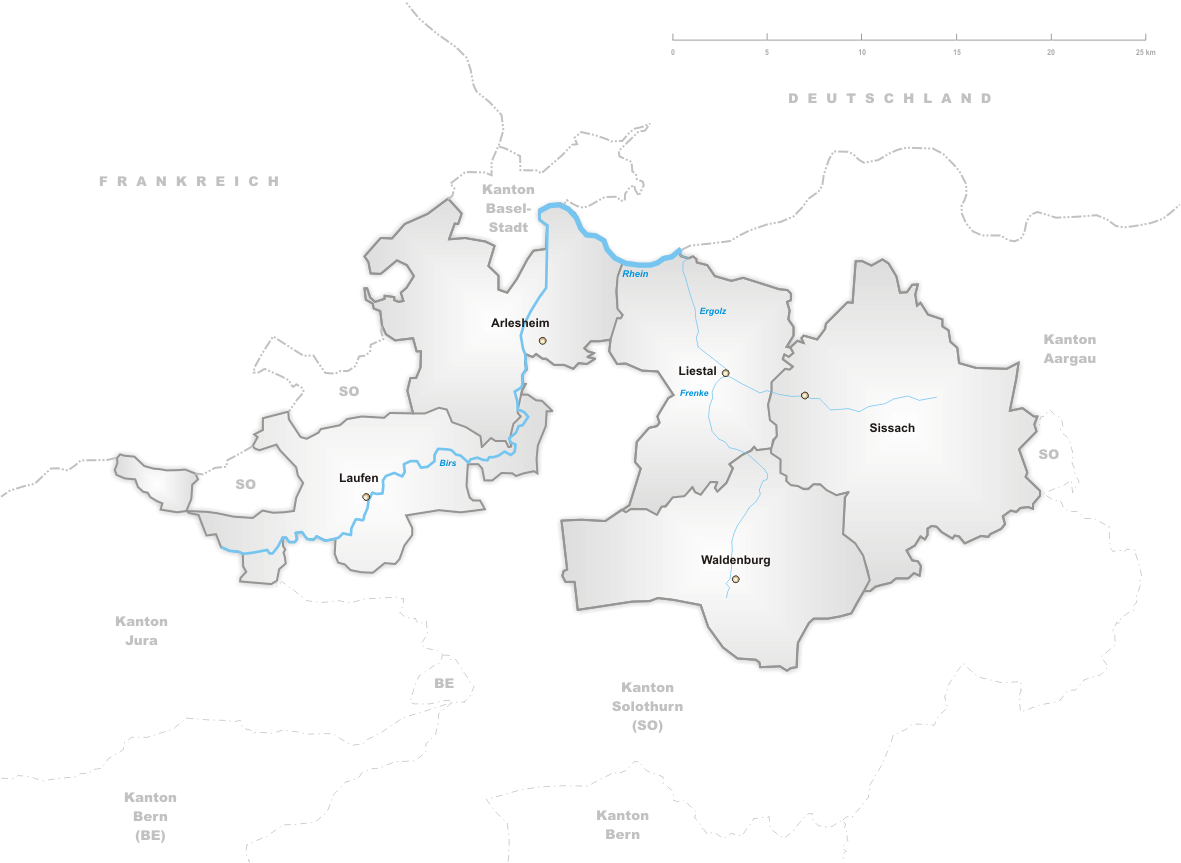
Districts of Canton Basel-Landschaft

There are 5 areas (Bezirke) in Basel-Landschaft (as of 2021):

- Arlesheim (Pop: 157,896) capital: Arlesheim (Pop: 9,240)
- Laufen (Pop: 20,524) capital: Laufen (Pop: 5,814)
- Liestal (Pop: 62,086) capital: Liestal (Pop: 14,963)
- Sissach (Pop: 36,331) capital: Sissach (Pop: 6,771)
- Waldenburg (Pop: 16,118) capital: Waldenburg (Pop: 1,124)

=== Municipalities ===
There are 86 municipalities in the canton (As of 2009).

== Demographics ==
The population is predominantly German-speaking. Protestantism is the main religion in the canton (43% as of 2000), while about one-third of the population (32%) is Roman Catholic. The Swiss Reformed Church and Christian Catholic Church of Switzerland are recognized as state churches. Between 1959 and 1970 the canton was Switzerland's fastest-growing, as the population almost doubled from 108,000 to 205,000. In 2021, the canton had a population of 292,955. As of 2007, the population included 48,719 foreign residents, who made up 18.1% of the population.

=== Historical population ===
The historical population is given in the following table:

Historic Population Data
Year	Total Population	Swiss	Non-Swiss	Population share of total country
1850	47,885	46,103	1,782	2.0%
1900	68,497	61,001	7,496	2.1%
1950	107,549	100,923	6,626	2.3%
1990	233,488	197,292	36,196	3.4%
2020	290,969			

== Economy ==
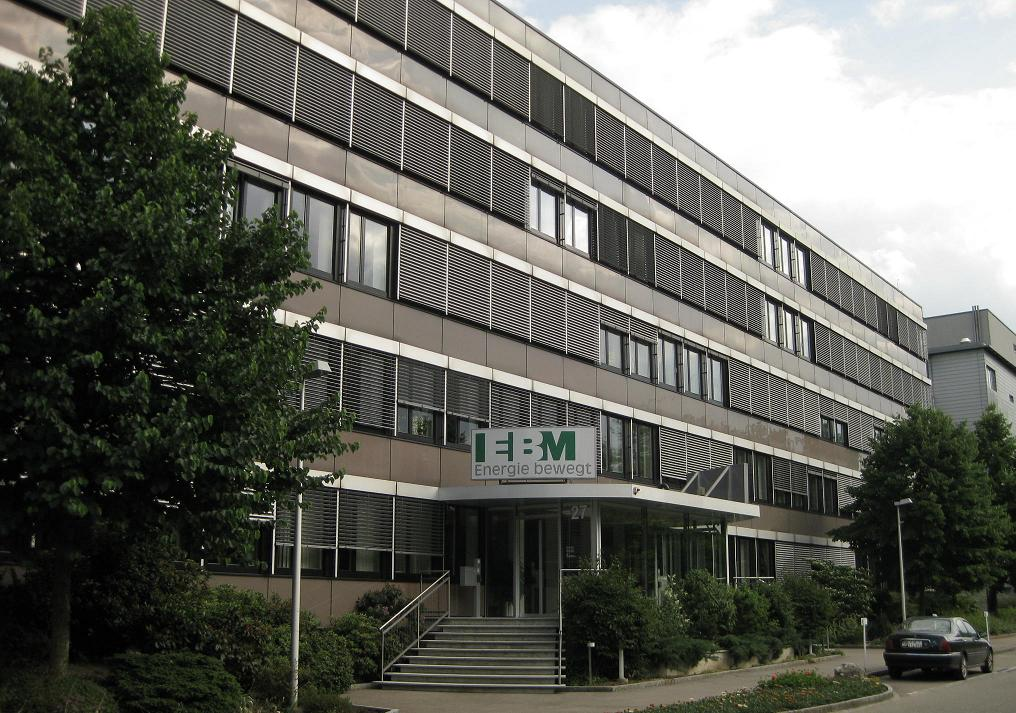
Elektra Birseck Münchenstein in Münchenstein

Agriculture in the canton includes fruit growing, dairy farming and cattle breeding. Important industries include textiles, metals and chemicals.

The canton of Basel-Landschaft is part of the economic region around Basel that includes parts of France and Germany as well as both half cantons of Basel. Since the 1960s there are agreements in force to strengthen contacts within the so-called Regio Basiliensis. This economic co-operation is often considered as the most intensive in Europe.

From the 17th century until the beginning of the 20th century silk weaving was important in Basel-Landschaft. Factories were established as early as 1850, following the finding of salt in underground deposits, founding industries such as the chemical industry in Schweizerhalle. The chemical industry means that Basel is one of the richer parts of Switzerland.

Air travel is served by EuroAirport Basel Mulhouse Freiburg.

== See also ==
- Augusta Raurica
- List of castles and fortresses in Switzerland
- Basellandschaftliche Zeitung, daily newspaper published in Liestal.
