= Canton of Solothurn =

Canton of Switzerland

Canton of Solothurn Kanton Solothurn (German) Canton of Soleure
- Canton
- Flag Coat of arms Logo
- Interactive map of Canton of Solothurn
- Coordinates: 47°9′N 7°38′E
- Capital: Solothurn
- Largest city: Olten
- Subdivisions: 104 municipalities, 10 districts

Government
  - President: Sandra Kolly-Altermatt
  - Executive: Regierungsrat (5)
  - Legislative: Kantonsrat (100)

Area
  - Total: 790.45 km^{2} (305.19 sq mi)

Population (December 2020)
  - Total: 277,462
  - Density: 351.02/km^{2} (909.13/sq mi)

GDP
  - Total: CHF 18.209 billion (2020)
  - Per capita: CHF 65,237 (2020)
- ISO 3166 code: CH-SO
- Highest point: 1,445 m (4,741 ft): Hasenmatt
- Lowest point: 277 m (909 ft): Birs at the cantonal border in Dornach
- Joined: 1481
- Languages: German
- Website: www.so.ch

The canton of Solothurn or canton of Soleure (German: Kanton Solothurn; Romansh: Chantun Soloturn; French: Canton de Soleure; Italian: Canton Soletta) is a canton of Switzerland. It is located in the northwest of Switzerland. The capital is Solothurn.

== History ==
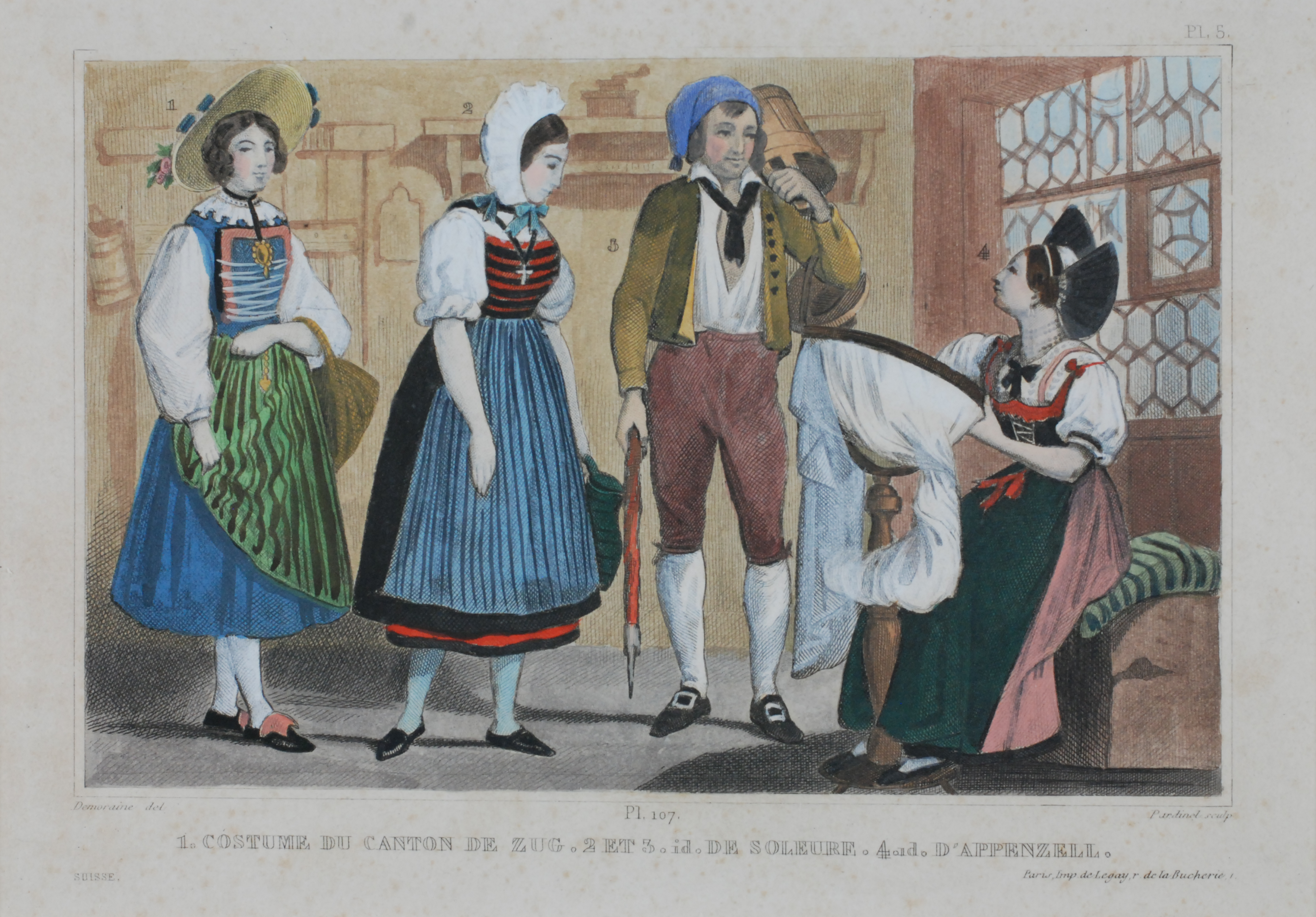
Figures 2 and 3 in the image are wearing traditional costumes of the Canton of Solothurn.

The village of Salodurum was founded in the time of the Roman emperor Tiberius (1st century CE). The territory of the canton comprises land acquired by the former town, mainly in the Middle Ages. For that reason the canton is irregular in shape and includes two exclaves along the French border, separated from the rest of the canton by Basel-Landschaft. In 1481, the canton became a member of the military alliance of the former Swiss confederation. At the end of the Reformation, Solothurn maintained its Catholic religion. Between 1798 and 1803 the canton was part of the Helvetic Republic. In 1803 Solothurn was one of the 19 Swiss cantons that were reconstituted by Napoleon (Mediation). In 1830, the population rebelled against the aristocratic regime and the canton became definitely liberal-democratic. Even though the population was strictly Roman Catholic, Solothurn did not join the Catholic separatist movement (Sonderbund) in 1845–1847. Similarly, the federal constitutions of 1848 and 1874 were approved. The current constitution of the canton dates from 1987.

== Geography ==
The canton is located in the north-west of Switzerland. To the west and south lie the cantons of Jura and Bern, to the east is Aargau. To the north the canton is bounded by the canton of Basel-Landschaft. Parts of two of the districts are exclaves and are located along the border of France (Grand Est). The lands are drained by the Aare river and its tributaries. The landscape is mostly flat, but it includes the foothills of the Jura massif. Part of this, the massif of the Weissenstein, overlooks Solothurn and the Mittelland from the north and has views of the Bernese Alps. The flat lands are a plain created by the Aare river. The total area of the canton is 791 km^{2}.

== Political subdivisions ==
=== Districts ===
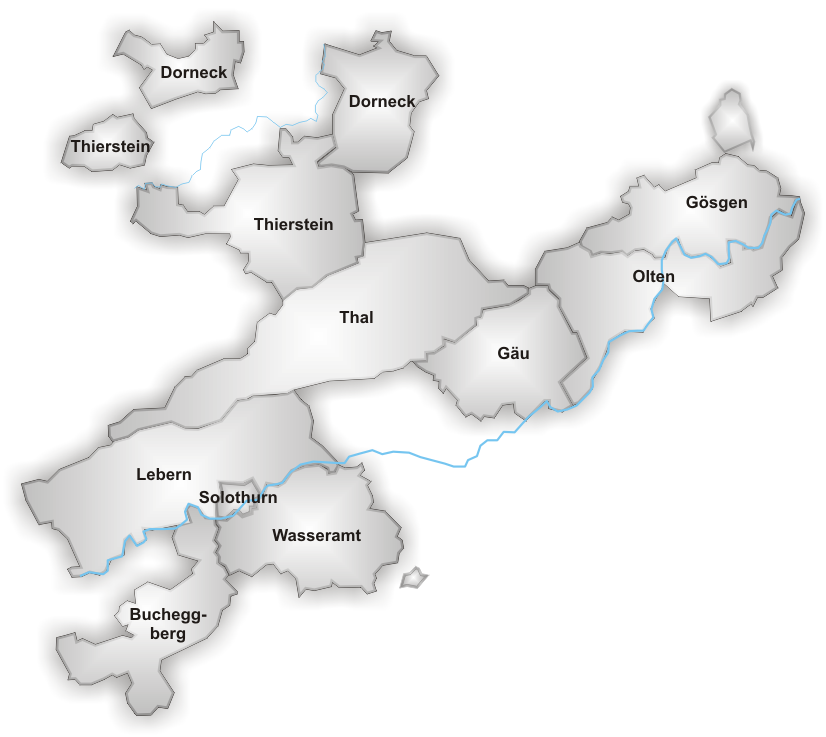
Districts of Canton Solothurn

From 2005, Solothurn's ten districts are merged pairwise into five electoral districts, termed Amteien (singular: Amtei). From 2005, the districts have only a statistical significance.

| Amtei | Districts |
|---|---|
| Dorneck-Thierstein (unofficially Schwarzbubenland) | Thierstein, Dorneck |
| Olten-Gösgen (unofficially Niederamt) | Olten, Gösgen |
| Solothurn-Lebern | Lebern, Solothurn |
| Thal-Gäu | Thal, Gäu |
| Wasseramt-Bucheggberg | Bucheggberg, Wasseramt |

=== Municipalities ===
There are 104 municipalities in the canton (as of 2026).

== Demographics ==
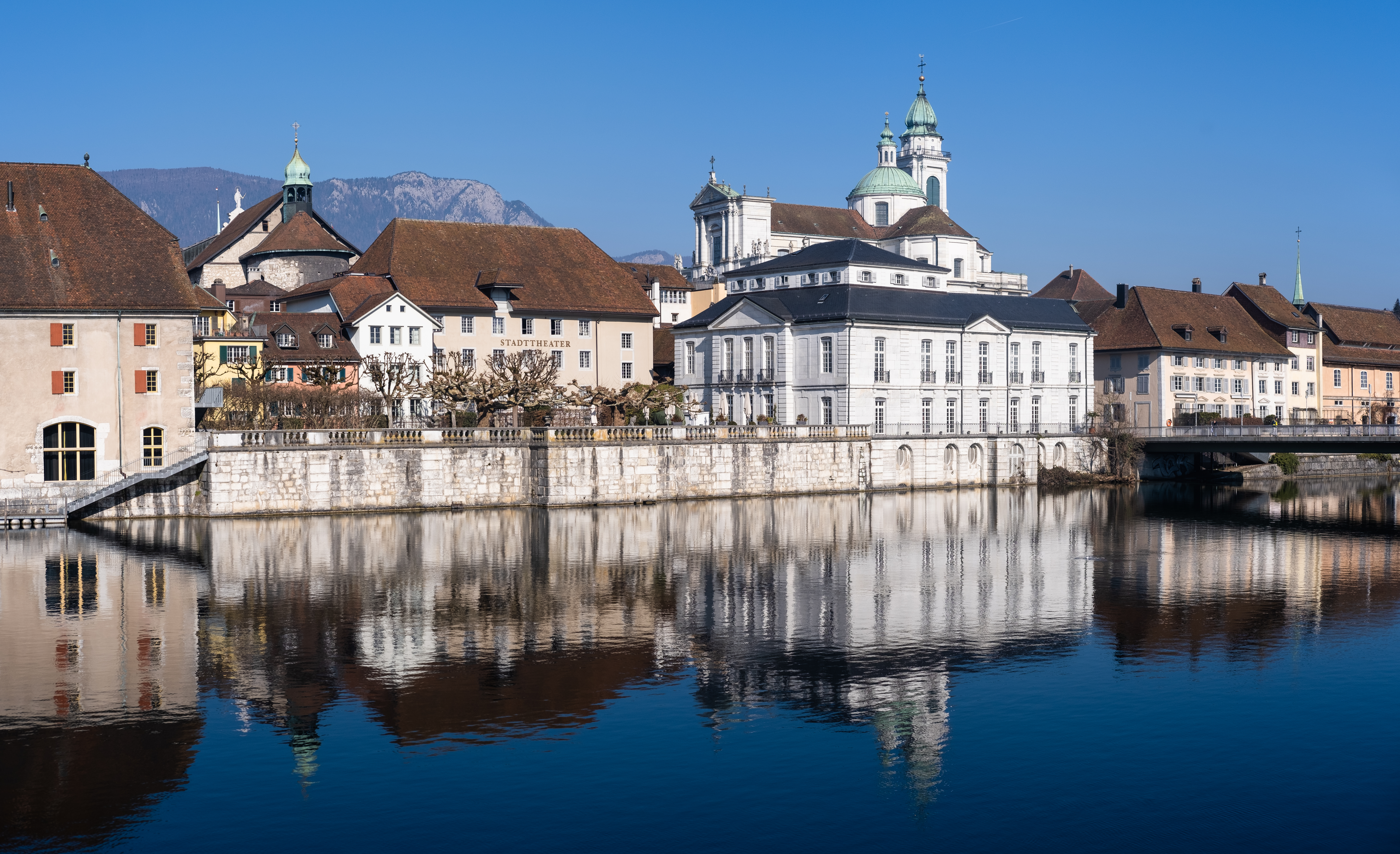
Solothurn, capital city of the eponymous canton

The population is mostly German-speaking. In 2000 about 44% of the population was Roman Catholic, with most of the remainder being Protestant (31%). The population of the canton (as of 31 December 2020) is 277,462. As of 2007, the population included 46,898 foreigners, or about 18.7% of the total population.

=== Historical population ===
The historical population is given in the following table:

Historical Population Data
| Year | Total | Swiss | Non-Swiss | Population share of total country |
|---|---|---|---|---|
| 1850 | 69 674 | 68 741 | 933 | 2.9% |
| 1880 | 80 362 | 78 153 | 2 209 | 2.8% |
| 1900 | 100 762 | 96 562 | 4 200 | 3.0% |
| 1950 | 170 508 | 164 172 | 6 336 | 3.6% |
| 1970 | 224 133 | 189 828 | 34 305 | 3.6% |
| 2000 | 244 341 | 201 877 | 42 464 | 3.4% |
| 2020 | 277 462 | | | 3.2% |

== Economy ==
Up to the 19th century agriculture was the main economic activity in the canton. Agriculture is still of importance, but manufacturing and service industries are now more significant. The industries of the canton are specialized in watches, jewellery, textiles, paper, cement and auto parts. Until recently the manufacturing of shoes was an important economic activity, but this industry became globally uncompetitive.

The canton is home to the Gösgen Nuclear Power Plant near Däniken which started operation in 1979.

== Politics ==
=== Federal election results ===
Percentages of the total vote by in the canton in the Federal Elections 1971–2015
| Party | Ideology | 1971 | 1975 | 1979 | 1983 | 1987 | 1991 | 1995 | 1999 | 2003 | 2007 | 2011 | 2015 |
|---|---|---|---|---|---|---|---|---|---|---|---|---|---|
| FDP.The Liberals^{a} | Classical liberalism | 34.3 | 38.7 | 39.0 | 37.2 | 36.3 | 32.8 | 25.4 | 25.4 | 24.0 | 21.0 | 18.4 | 21.2 |
| CVP/PDC/PPD/PCD | Christian democracy | 27.7 | 26.0 | 27.6 | 26.7 | 25.1 | 22.2 | 21.5 | 21.4 | 21.0 | 20.4 | 17.9 | 14.8 |
| SP/PS | Social democracy | 26.3 | 31.4 | 28.4 | 27.8 | 22.3 | 19.8 | 24.2 | 27.2 | 25.4 | 19.5 | 18.3 | 20.0 |
| SVP/UDC | Swiss nationalism | * ^{b} | * | * | * | * | * | 6.7 | 18.6 | 22.5 | 27.1 | 24.3 | 28.8 |
| Ring of Independents | Social liberalism | 7.2 | * | * | 4.0 | 3.5 | 2.9 | 1.6 | * | * | * | * | * |
| EVP/PEV | Christian democracy | * | * | * | * | * | 1.2 | * | * | 1.2 | 1.8 | 1.5 | 1.2 |
| GLP/PVL | Green liberalism | * | * | * | * | * | * | * | * | * | * | 5.0 | 3.5 |
| BDP/PBD | Conservatism | * | * | * | * | * | * | * | * | * | * | 4.4 | 3.4 |
| PdA/PST-POP/PC/PSL | Socialism | * | * | 1.0 | * | 0.3 | * | * | * | * | * | * | * |
| POCH | Progressivism | * | 3.4 | 4.1 | 3.5 | * | * | * | * | * | * | * | * |
| GPS/PES | Green politics | * | * | * | * | * | 7.3 | 5.8 | 4.9 | 6.0 | 10.0 | 7.5 | 5.6 |
| SD/DS | National conservatism | 4.6 | * | * | * | * | * | 2.8 | * | * | 0.4 | 0.4 | * |
| EDU/UDF | Christian right | * | * | * | * | * | * | * | * | * | * | 0.5 | 0.5 |
| FPS/PSL | Right-wing populism | * | * | * | * | 4.9 | 9.1 | 10.6 | 1.3 | * | * | * | * |
| Other | | * | 0.6 | * | 0.9 | 7.5 | 4.7 | 1.3 | 1.3 | * | * | 2.3 | 1.0 |
| Voter participation % | | 64.2 | 64.1 | 56.9 | 60.7 | 60.8 | 56.1 | 48.3 | 50.0 | 47.4 | 50.7 | 51.7 | 50.2 |

^a FDP before 2009, FDP.The Liberals after 2009
^b "*" indicates that the party was not on the ballot in this canton.

== Transport ==
The canton has good connections with other parts of Switzerland, both by rail and by road. There is a railway junction at Olten with direct trains to Geneva, Zürich, Basel and the Ticino via Lucerne. The nearest airports to the canton are EuroAirport Basel Mulhouse Freiburg, Bern Airport and Zurich Airport.
