= Sutermeister =

Sutermeister is a comparatively rare Swiss German/Swabian surname, found in Zofingen and Schöftland.

Arnold Sutermeister of Zofingen emigrated to the United States in 1846, establishing the surname as Swiss-American.

== People called Sutermeister ==
=== Sutermeister-Moehrlen-Muhlberg family ===
Christophe Moehrlen (1800–1871)
Agathe Ernestine Moehrlen (1832—1900)	Otto Sutermeister (1832—1901)
Friedrich Mühlberg (1840–1915)	Emilie Sutermeister (ca1858-?)	Eugen Sutermeister (1862—1931)	Paul Sutermeister (1864—1905)	Werner Sutermeister (1868—1939)	Friedrich Sutermeister (1873–1934)	Maria Hunziker (?)(cousin of Hans Hunziker)
Max Mühlberg (1873–1947)	Hans Martin Sutermeister (1907—1977)	Heinrich Sutermeister (Swiss composer, 1910—1995)	Peter Sutermeister (1916—2003)

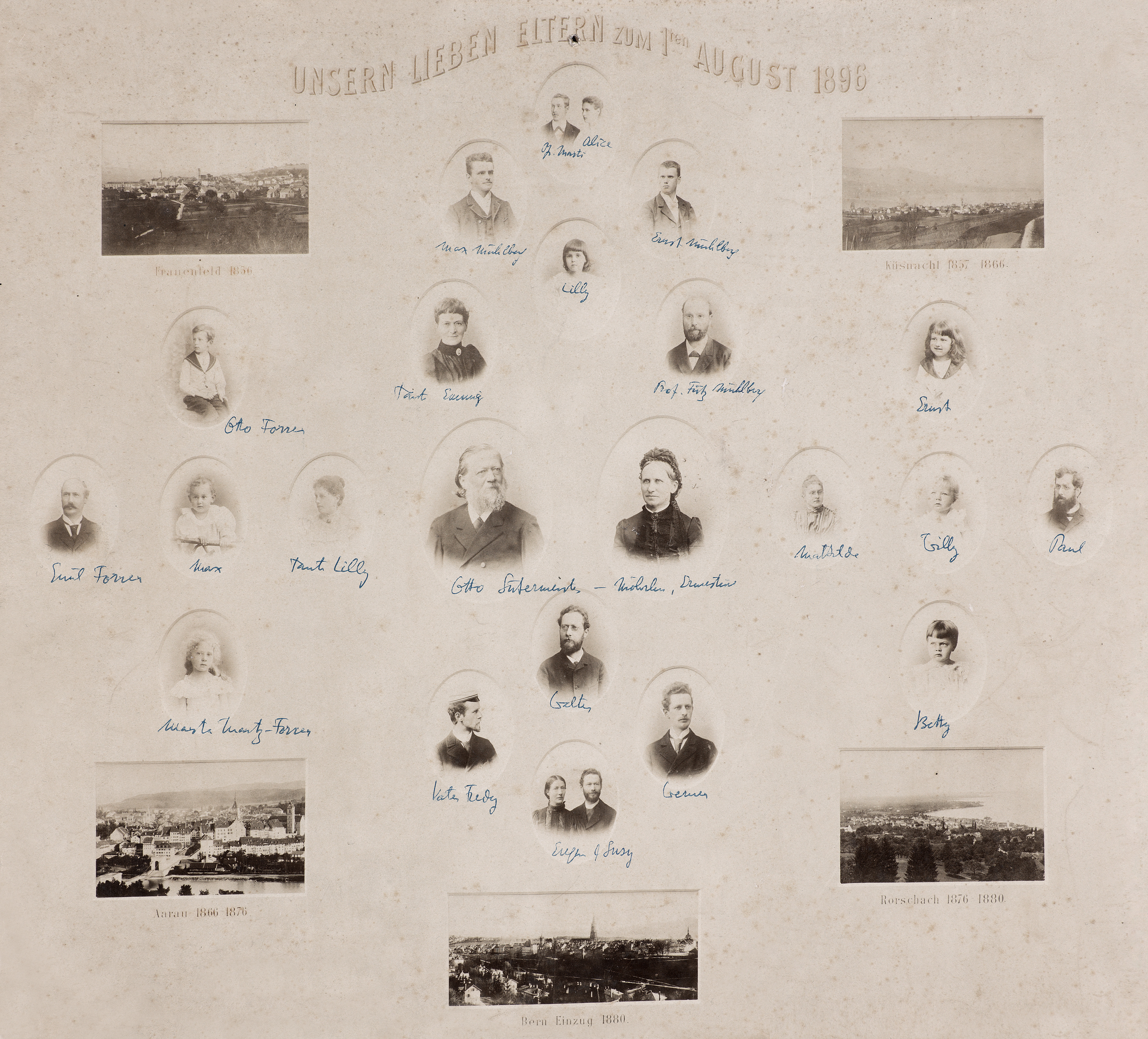
Sutermeister-Moehrlen-Muhlberg family: on the picture: Otto Sutermeister with his sons Fredy, Eugen, Werner and Paul, as well as his father-in-law Christophe Moehrlen.

=== Other Sutermeisters ===
- Arnold Sutermeister (1830–1907), captain in the American Civil War, father of Robert
- Karl Konrad Sutermeister (1847–1918), Swiss engineer and timber business man
- Margaret Sutermeister (1875–1950), American photographer, sister of Edwin
- Edwin Sutermeister (1876–1958), American chemist, brother of Margaret
- Guido Sutermeister (1883–1966), Italian archaeologist and engineer of Swiss origin
- John Rudolph Sutermeister (1803–1826), American jurist and poet
- Robert A. Sutermeister (1913–2008), American economist, son of Arnold Sutermeister
- Rudolf Sutermeister (1802–1868), Swiss doctor
- Helen Sutermeister (1943 or 1944 – 1979), archaeologist
