= Friedrich Sutermeister =

Swiss theologian and pastor

Frederick Sutermeister
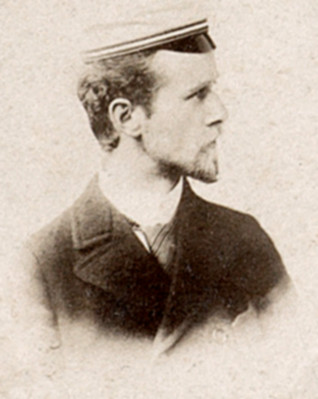
- Frederick Sutermeister
- Born: 29 January 1873; Aarau, Switzerland
- Died: 16 July 1934 (aged 61)
- Occupations: Pastor and writer
- Writing career
- Notable work: Articles in the Neue Wege
- Movement: Christian socialism

Frederick Sutermeister (29 January 1873 in Aarau – 16 July 1934) was a Swiss theologian and pastor.

== Biography ==
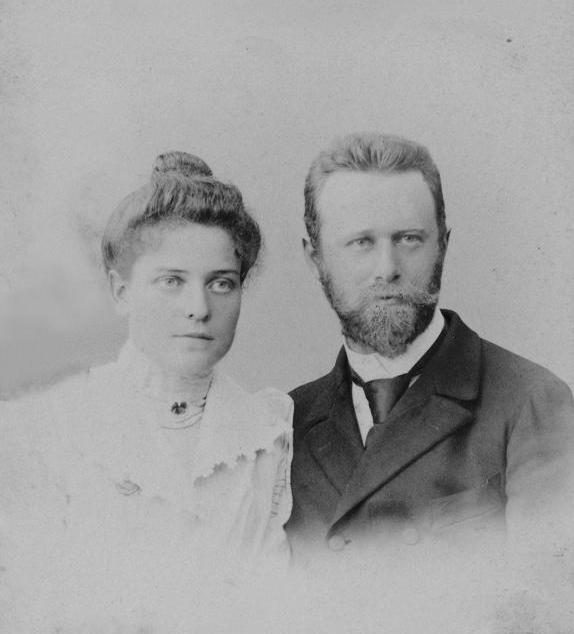
Portrait with his wife Maria Hunziker

Sutermeister spent his childhood at the Mariaberg Abbey (St. Gallen), before the family moved to Bern in 1880, where he attended high school (Gymnasium Kirchenfeld). At the age of 16 he began to attend the Humanistisches Gymnasium Basel where he established friendship with Swiss theologian Albert Barth. He then studied theology at the universities of Basel, Bern and Berlin, where he attended lectures of Bernhard Duhm, Adolf von Harnack and Friedrich Paulsen (among others). After graduating, he worked as a tutor for the Quarles van Ufford family in the Netherlands.

In 1899 he returned to Switzerland, began his sermon in Schlossrued and married Maria Hunziker (1875–1947) in 1901. With his brothers Eugen and Paul, he published the Christian entertainment magazine Für's Heim. In 1910 he was appointed to a parish in Feuerthalen. During these years, he regularly wrote articles for the Christian socialist magazine Neue Wege. In 1921 he was appointed to a parish in Binningen, where he also worked for the Blue Cross and where he took over Wilhelm Denz′s poor relief.

Sutermeister played viola and often played piano four hands with his son Heinrich Sutermeister (1910–1995); his friendship with Walter Courvoisier contributed to his son's career. His son Hans Martin (1907–1977) described him as a conflictive personality in his autobiographic novel Zwischen zwei Welten.
