= List of stage and broadcast works by Heinrich Sutermeister =

This is a complete list of the stage and broadcast works by Heinrich Sutermeister (1910–1995).

Sutermeister was notable as a pioneer of radio and television opera. He composed three works for radio and three for television, as well as eight conventional operas, a monodrama and a ballet.

== List ==
Title	Genre	Subdivisions	Libretto	Première date	Place, theatre
Die schwarze Spinne	radio opera	1 act	Albert Rösler, after Jeremias Gotthelf's Die schwarze Spinne	15 October 1936	Radio Bern
Romeo und Julia	opera	2 acts	Sutermeister, after William Shakespeare's Romeo and Juliet	13 April 1940	Dresden, Staatsoper
Die Zauberinsel	opera	2 acts	Sutermeister, after Shakespeare's The Tempest	30 October 1942	Dresden, Staatsoper
Niobe	monodrama	2 acts	Peter Sutermeister	22 June 1946	Zurich
Raskolnikoff	opera	2 acts	Peter Sutermeister, after Fyodor Dostoyevsky's Crime and Punishment	14 October 1948	Stockholm
Fingerhütchen	radio ballad	1 act	Sutermeister, after Conrad Ferdinand Meyer	12 February 1950	Berlin
Die Füsse im Feuer	radio ballad	1 act	Sutermeister, after Conrad Ferdinand Meyer's ballad Die Füße im Feuer	12 February 1950	Berlin
Der rote Stiefel	opera	2 acts	Sutermeister, after Wilhelm Hauff	22 November 1951	Stockholm
Max und Moritz	4 burleske Tanzszenen (ballet)		after Wilhelm Busch's Max and Moritz	1951	Radio Bern
Le théâtre du monde	opera		Edmond Jeanneret, after Pedro Calderón de la Barca's El gran teatro del mundo	1957	Neuchâtel
Titus Feuerfuchs oder Die Liebe, Tücke und Perücke	opera	2 acts	Sutermeister, after Johann Nestroy's Der Talisman	14 April 1958	Basel
Seraphine (Die stümme Apothekerin)	television opera	1 act	Sutermeister, after François Rabelais's Gargantua and Pantagruel	10 June 1959	Swiss Television
Das Gespenst von Canterville	television opera	1 act	Sutermeister, after Oscar Wilde's The Canterville Ghost	6 September 1964	Mainz, ZDF
Madame Bovary	opera	2 acts	Sutermeister, after Gustave Flaubert's Madame Bovary	26 May 1967	Zurich
Das Flaschenteufel	television opera		Kurt Weibel, after Robert Louis Stevenson's The Bottle Imp	1971	Mainz, ZDF
Le roi Bérenger	opera	prologue and 18 scenes	Sutermeister, after Eugène Ionesco's Le roi se meurt	22 July 1985	Munich
