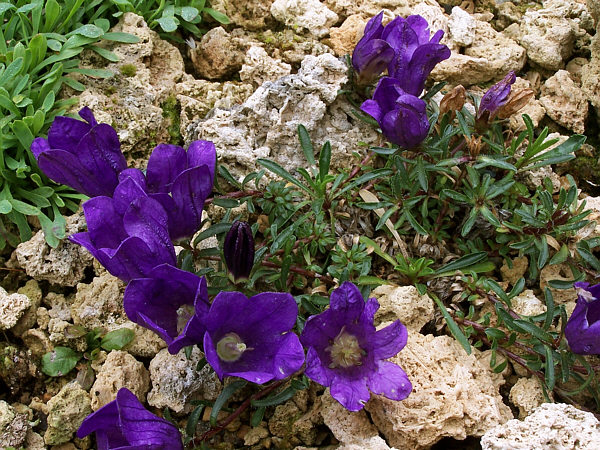
- Edraianthus serpyllifolius

Scientific classification
- Kingdom: Plantae
- Clade: Embryophytes
- Clade: Tracheophytes
- Clade: Spermatophytes
- Clade: Angiosperms
- Clade: Eudicots
- Clade: Asterids
- Order: Asterales
- Family: Campanulaceae
- Subfamily: Campanuloideae
- Genus: Edraianthus; A.DC. (1839), nom. & orth. cons.

Species
- 21; see text

Synonyms
- Hedraeanthus Griseb. (1846), orth. var.; Hedranthus Rupr. (1867); Pilorea Raf. (1837); Protoedraianthus (Lakušic) Lakušic (1988)

= Edraianthus =

Genus of flowering plants

Edraianthus (rock bells or grassy bells) is a small genus of flowering plants in the family Campanulaceae. Edraianthus species are native to mountain regions of the Balkan, including Bosnia, Bulgaria, Croatia, Montenegro and Serbia, and as far as Romania, Italy and Greece.

They are small perennial plants, with tufts of grassy leaves and fine bell-shaped flowers, usually blue. They are often used as ornamental plants in rock gardens.

The genus name is derived from the Greek hedraios (sitting) and anthos (flower).

== Species ==
21 species are accepted.

- Edraianthus australis (Wettst.) Lakušic ex Greuter, Burdet & G.Long
- Edraianthus caespitosus F.K.Mey.
- Edraianthus canescens D.Lakušic, Niketić & Stevan.
- Edraianthus dalmaticus (A.DC.) A.DC.
- Edraianthus dinaricus (A.Kern.) Wettst.
- Edraianthus glisicii Cernjavski & Soska
- Edraianthus graminifolius (L.) A.DC. ex Meisn.
- Edraianthus hercegovinus K.Malý
- Edraianthus horvatii Lakušic
- Edraianthus × intermedius Degen
- Edraianthus × lakusicii Stevan. & D.Lakušic
- Edraianthus × murbeckii Wettst.
- Edraianthus niveus Beck
- Edraianthus pilosulus (Beck) Surina & D.Lakušic
- Edraianthus pubescens F.K.Mey.
- Edraianthus pulevicii Surina & D.Lakušic
- Edraianthus pumilio (Port. ex Schult.) A.DC.
- Edraianthus serbicus Petrovič
- Edraianthus serpyllifolius (Vis.) A.DC.
- Edraianthus stankovicii (Lakušic) D.Lakusic & Surina
- Edraianthus sutjeskae Lakušic
- Edraianthus tarae Lakušic
- Edraianthus tenuifolius (A.DC.) A.DC.
- Edraianthus wettsteinii Halácsy & Bald.

Ten species of the genus Edraianthus are often placed in genus Wahlenbergia instead. Selected Edraianthus species are also placed in Muehlbergella, Halacsyella or Hedraeanthus by some botanists. Campanula parnassica is sometimes classified as Edraianthus parnassicus.

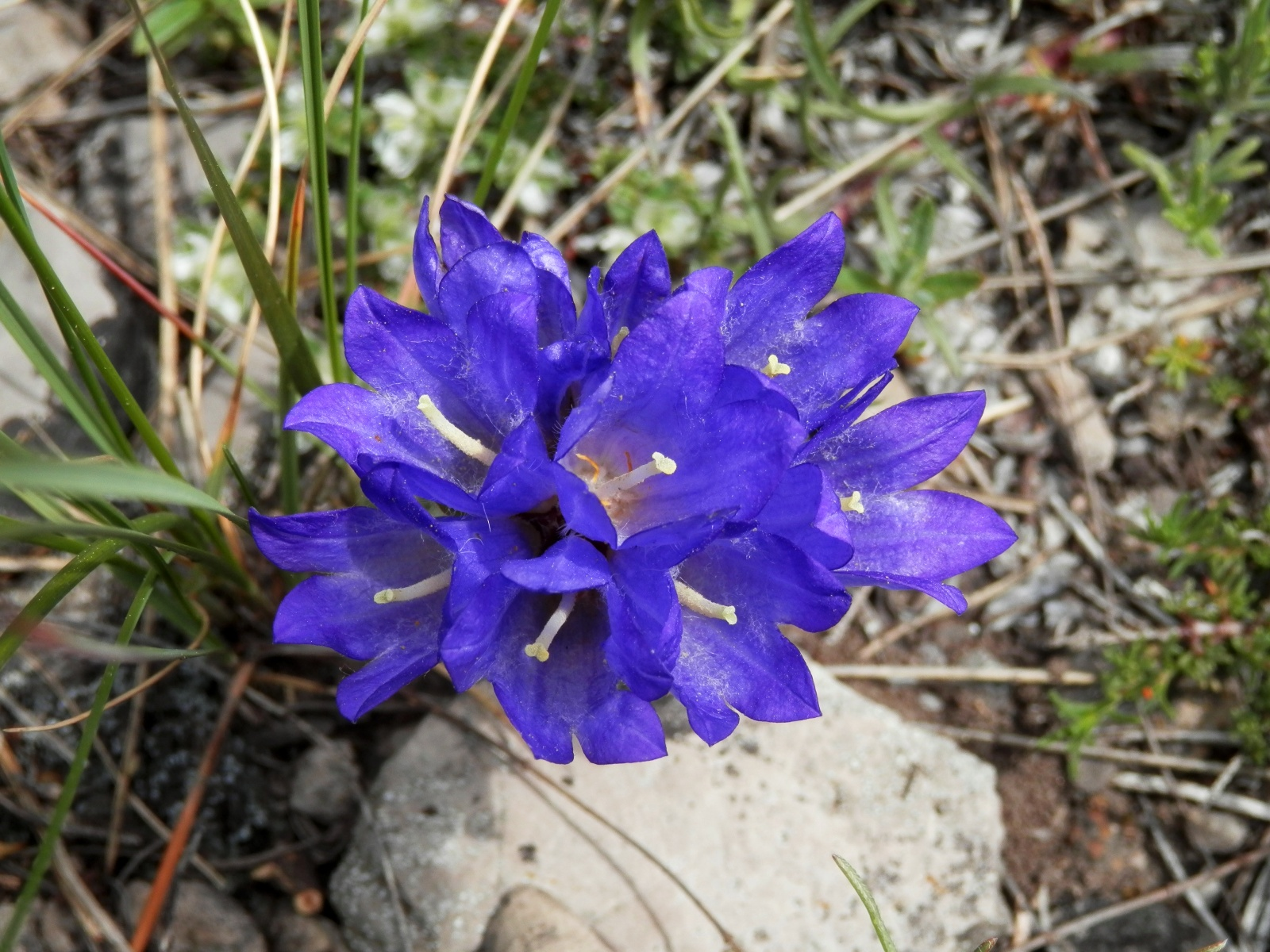
Edraianthus serbicus, Bulgaria
