= 11th Independent Battery Indiana Light Artillery =

11th Indiana Independent Light Artillery Battery
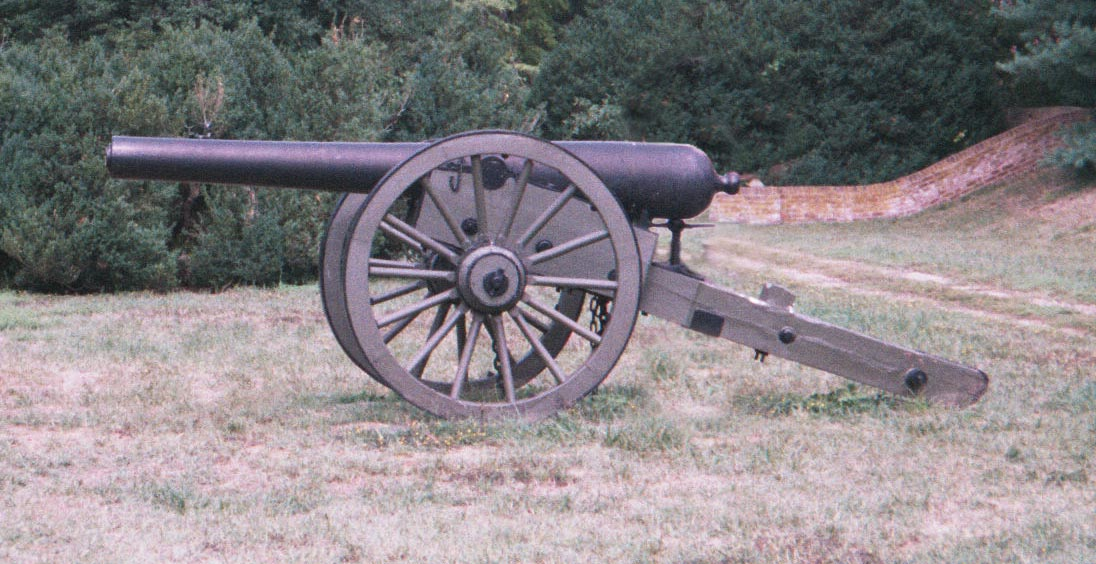
- A 4.5-inch siege (ordnance) rifle (sometimes mistakenly called a "Rodman gun"). Four of these were issued to the 11th Indiana Battery at Louisville in February 1862.
- Active: December 17, 1861 - November 21, 1864
- Disbanded: November 21, 1864
- Country: United States
- Allegiance: Union
- Branch: Artillery
- Size: Battery
- Part of: Army of the Ohio; Army of the Cumberland
- Engagements: American Civil War: Siege of Corinth; Battle of Nashville; Battle of Murfreesboro; Battle of Franklin; Battle of Chickamauga; Battle of Lookout Mountain; Battle of Missionary Ridge; Battle of Resaca; Battle of New Hope Church; Battle of Jonesboro

Commanders
- Captain: Arnold Sutermeister

The 11th Independent Battery Indiana Light Artillery, generally known as the 11th Indiana Battery, was an artillery battery in the Union Army during the American Civil War. It served in several important campaigns in the Western Theater, including the Battle of Chickamauga in late 1863.

Recruited at Fort Wayne, Indiana, in late 1861, the 11th Indiana Battery was mustered into service on December 17, 1861, at Indianapolis, Indiana. It was ordered to report for duty in Louisville, Kentucky, on February 6, 1862. The battery was consolidated with the 18th Indiana Battery on November 21, 1864.

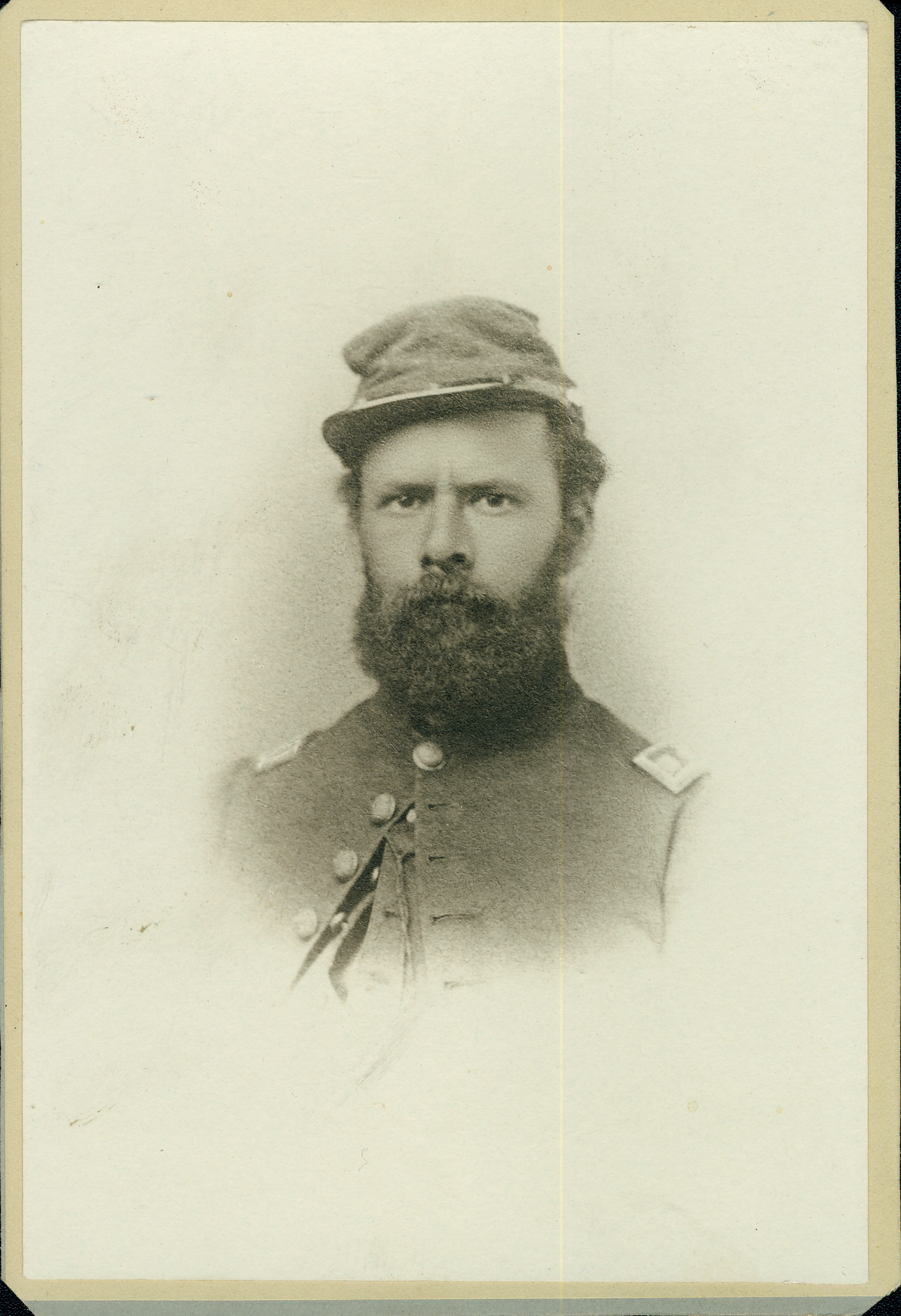
Arnold Sutermeister, the battery's captain.

== See also ==
- List of Indiana Civil War regiments
