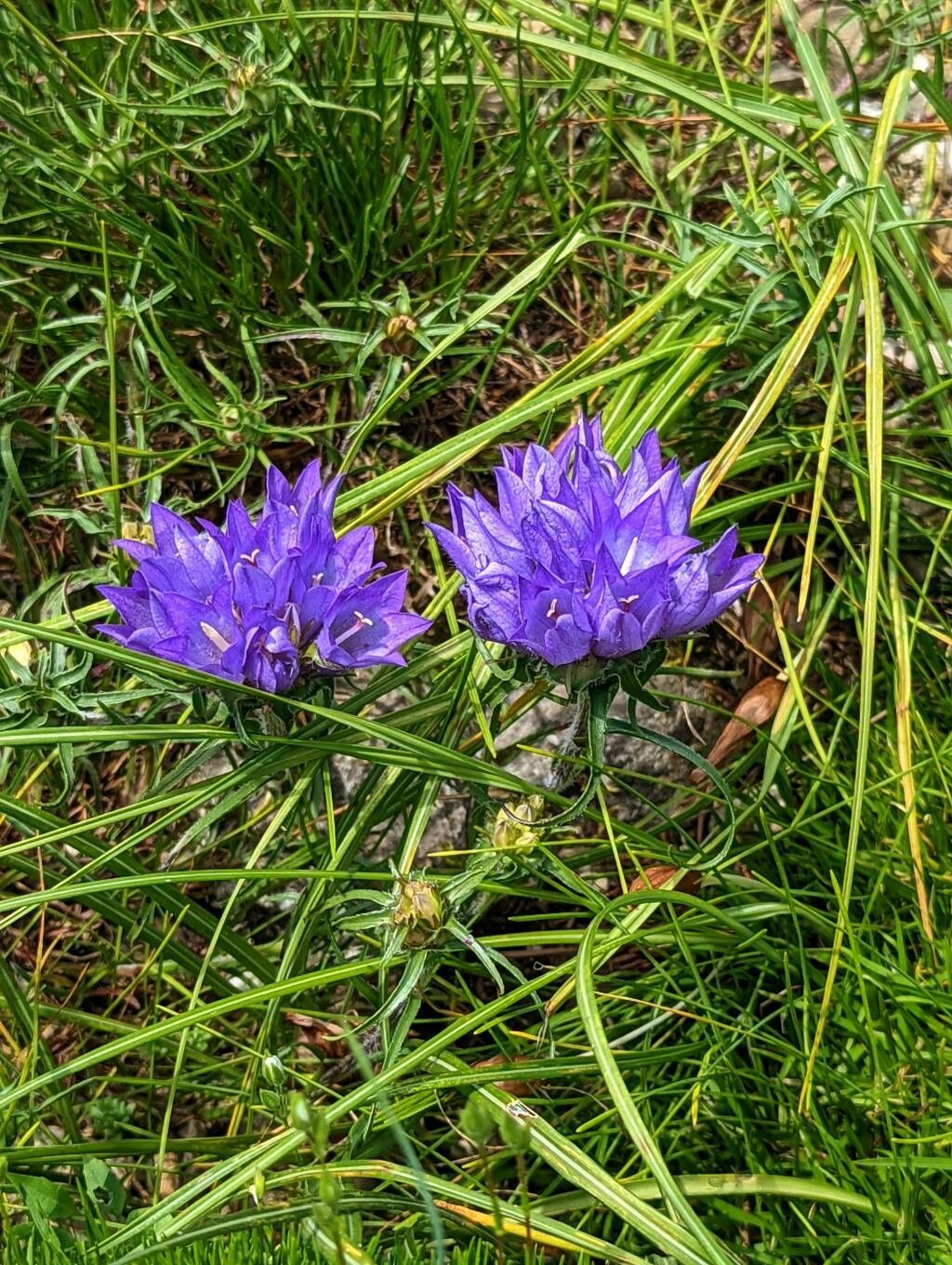

Scientific classification
- Kingdom: Plantae
- Clade: Tracheophytes
- Clade: Angiosperms
- Clade: Eudicots
- Clade: Asterids
- Order: Asterales
- Family: Campanulaceae
- Genus: Edraianthus
- Species: E. dalmaticus

Binomial name
- Edraianthus dalmaticus A.DC.

= Edraianthus dalmaticus =

Dalmatian rockbell

Species of flowering plant

Edraianthus dalmaticus, (syn. Wahlenbergia dalmatica A.DC.) or Dalmatian rockbell, is an ornamental plant in the Campanulaceae (bellflower) family.

This herbaceous perennial is native to the mountains of Dalmatia in Croatia but now used in gardening. It is a tufted species with narrow grass-like leaves, 2 to 4 inches in length, and flower-stems at first drooping, afterwards erect, 4 to 6 inches high, with large flowers of a violet-blue color, in clusters which appear in July and August.
