= Friedrich Mühlberg =

Swiss geologist

Friedrich (Fritz) Christoph Mühlberg
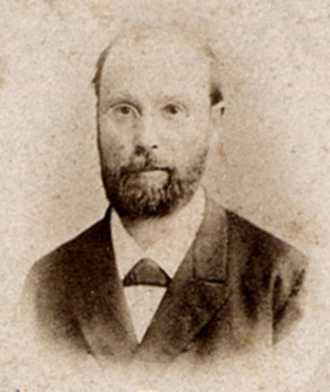
- Friedrich Mühlberg
- Born: 19 April 1840; Aarau, Switzerland
- Died: 25 May 1915 (aged 75); Aarau, Switzerland
- Citizenship: Swiss
- Scientific career
- Fields: Geology

Friedrich (Fritz) Christoph Mühlberg (19 April 1840 in Aarau – 25 May 1915) was a Swiss geologist.

== Life ==
Mühlberg went to school in Aarau from 1859 and studied botany, geology and chemistry at the Polytechnic School in Zurich and got his diploma in Chemistry in 1861. After he was a teacher at the cantonal school in Zug and, from 1866, in Aarau, where he was also teacher of Albert Einstein.

In 1886, he married Emilie Sophie Sutermeister (1858-1922), a daughter of Ernestine Moehrlen and Otto Sutermeister.

Mühlberg mapped the eastern Jura and recognized that the Folded Jura was pushed up to the Table Jura. In 1888 he received an honorary degree of the University of Basel. He also dealt with hydrogeology and the geology of the Quaternary (ice ages), and was a defender of nature conservation.

His son was the geologist Max Mühlberg, his daughter Lily Mühlberg was a physician.

In 1890, he was honoured by botanist Feer who published a monotypic genus of flowering plants from the North Caucus in the family Campanulaceae, as Muehlbergella.
