= Martin Schlumpf =

Swiss composer and jazz musician

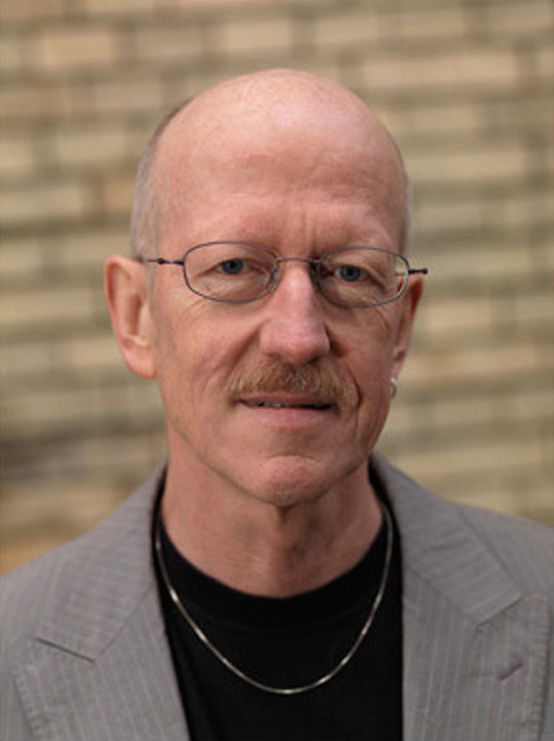
The musician in 2011

Martin Schlumpf (born 3 December 1947) is a Swiss musician, composer, conductor, improviser (double bass, saxophone and bass clarinet) and academic teacher.

== Career ==
Born in Aarau, Schlumpf studied at the conservatory of Zurich, the clarinet with Hansjürg Leuthold, the piano with Warren Thew and Evelyne Dubourg, conducting with Ferdinand Leitner, and theory and composition with Rudolf Kelterborn. He continued his studies with Boris Blacher in Berlin.

From 1977 to 2011 he was professor of music theory and improvisation at the Departement Musik of the Zürcher Hochschule der Künste (ZHdK, formerly Musikhochschule). He served the department as Konventspräsident from 1999 to 2010.

== Selected works ==
- Trio for flute, viola and harp, 1970
- 5 Stücke für grosses Orchester (5 pieces for large orchestra), 1973
- Tenebrae for soprano, alto, baritone, mixed choir, five brass players, harpsichord and string quintet (after Paul Celan), 1976/77
- Jeux for 3 clarinets, 1979
- Ostinato II for three improvising musicians and orchestra, 1982
- "... per la quinta vox..." for viola solo, 1986
- Winterkreis for saxophone quartet, 1991
- December Rains for piano, 1992/93
- Mouvements for piano and orchestra, 1994/99
- Frühling for percussion quartet, 1995
- …aufflattern mit dunklen Gesichtern die Fledermäuse…, fall music for four female voices, 1995
- Trio for clarinet, cello and piano, 1997
- Rattaplasma 2 for clarinet and computer (Ambisonics), 2001
- Waves, concerto for cello, trumpet, string orchestra and computer (Ambisonics), 2002
- pulsar_1 for flute, clarinet, accordion, drums and computer (Ambisonics), 2006/07
- Sommerkreis for string quartet, 2007
- pulsar_2 for voice, flute, piano and computer (Ambisonics), 2009
- Streams, concerto for clarinet, bass trombone and 17 instruments, 2010
- The Five Points for clarinet and string quartet, 2012
- Spiegelbilder for viola, cello and piano, 2013
- Triple Suite, triple concerto for violin, cello, piano and orchestra, 2015

== Selected recordings ==
- Swiss Fusion 84 – Live (utr 4009 LP), 1984
- Noblesse galvanisée (PL 1267-20/21 2LP), Martin Schlumpf's Bermuda Viereck, 1985
- Martin Schlumpf’s Bermuda Viereck (utr 4038 CD), 1990
- Cumuli (utr 4049 CD), Martin Schlumpf's Bermuda Viereck, 1992
- Martin Schlumpf: Vier Jahreszeiten (Musikszene Schweiz CD 6129), 1996
- Conlon Nancarrow – Martin Schlumpf: Die Kunst des Tempokanons (artist.cd, ARTS 8103 2), 2004
- Timegrid_01 (tgmusic 47.101), Zweizeit, 2008
- pulsar_1 (tgmusic 47.102 / ZHdK Records 15/09), Martin Schlumpf, 2009
- Summer Circle (Navona Records, NV5873), 2012

== Selected awards ==
- 1972 First prize in the composition competition of Zurich
- 1975 First prize in the composition competition of the Tonhalle-Gesellschaft Zürich
- 1979 First prize in the composition competition of Zurich
- Werkjahre of the Aargauer Kuratorium and Zürich
