= Margaret Sutermeister =

American photographer (1875–1950)

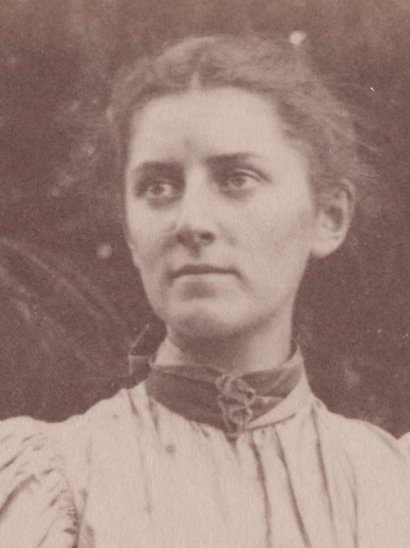
- self–portrait, 1895, Albumen silver print
- Born: April 10, 1875; Milton, Massachusetts
- Died: May 30, 1950 (aged 75); Milton, Massachusetts
- Known for: Photography

Margaret Sutermeister (1875–1950) was an American photographer active in Massachusetts in the late 19th and early 20th centuries.

== Biography ==
Margaret "Daisy" Sutermeister was born in 1875 in Milton, Massachusetts, to Emmanuel Sutermeister and Harriet Georgianna Davenport. Her father, who was of Swiss descent, ran a commercial plant nursery and vegetable garden and was also a fireman. Her brother was chemist Edwin Sutermeister. She lived for most of her life in the Capen-Davenport-Sutermeister House on Canton Avenue, which had been built in 1781 and was located on the same property as the family nursery.

After leaving school in 1894, Sutermeister took up photography using a glass plate camera to document everyday life in Milton and the surrounding area. Over the next 15 years, she shot a wide range of subjects: romantic landscapes, lively street scenes, scientific experiments, and portraits both formal and candid. Among the people she photographed are middle-class whites, African Americans, Gypsy vendors, farmhands, and Asian laundrymen.

When her father died in 1909, she took over managing the family's Davenport Nursery and gave up photography.

She died in 1951, and a year later the new owners of her house discovered her 1800 glass-plate negatives in a barn. They donated this archive of turn-of-the-century Massachusetts life to the Milton Historical Society. It was published in the early 1990s by art historian Judith Bookbinder and has formed the basis of a number of exhibitions since.

Ten of Sutermeister's photographs are in the collection of the National Portrait Gallery.
