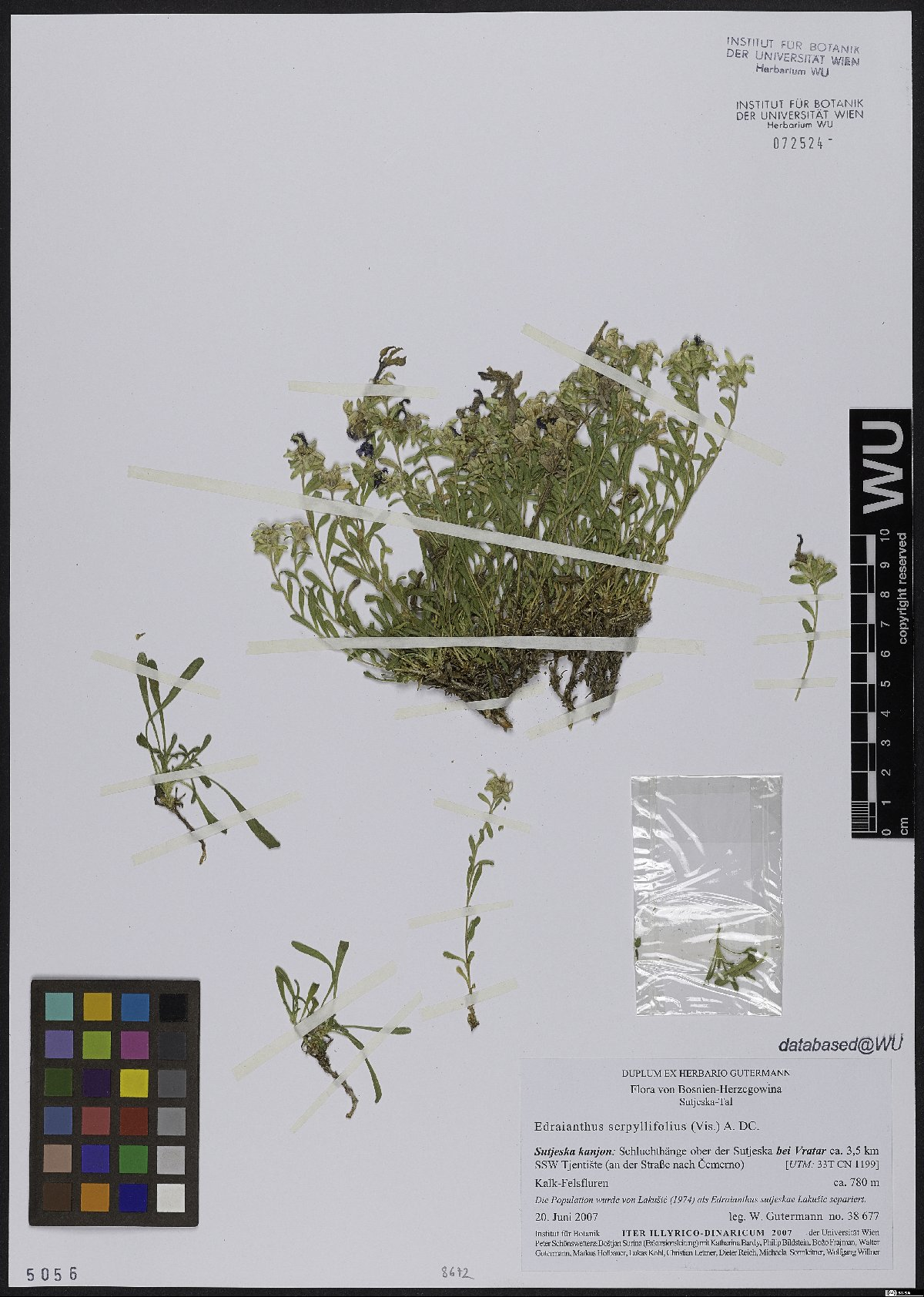

Scientific classification
- Kingdom: Plantae
- Clade: Tracheophytes
- Clade: Angiosperms
- Clade: Eudicots
- Clade: Asterids
- Order: Asterales
- Family: Campanulaceae
- Genus: Edraianthus
- Species: E. sutjeskae

Binomial name
- Edraianthus sutjeskae Lkšić

= Edraianthus sutjeskae =

Sutjeska's rockbell

Species of flowering plant

Edraianthus sutjeskae, or Sutjeska's rockbell, is the endemic plant of the family Campanulaceae . This species is separated from populations of Edraianthus serpylifolius.

== Description ==
Like other species of the genus Edraianthus, this plant is a perennial, usually a height of about 2-5 (rarely to 8 cm). It is relatively high, often flattened or upright and bare, sparsely hairy. Leaves are a little sticky, glossy, most common naked, and rarely obostranos little hairy. It length is about 10-30, sometimes up to 45 mm, and a wide and 1.5-4 mm. Whole the edge or serrated bad, a little hairy. Bracts are few, narrow elongated. The grounds are enlarged and green with a purple dressing. The calyx is long 5-10 mm, magenta or yellow, naked.

It blossoms in June and July. The corolla is bell-shaped, dark purple, naked or with little hairy marbling. Ordinary debt is about 15-20 mm. Fruit is quiver with irregular flap that opens at the top and fall. The seeds are egg-shaped, flat, wide ellipsoid. Light and are naked, long around 1.2-1.4 mm wide about 1 mm.

== Ecology and distribution ==
This rockbell is growing on the rocks and in the vegetation semisteadyed rock creeps up to the tops of high mountains in a number of communities with Sesleria juncifolia and Oxytropidion dinarica. Edraianthus sutjeskae is stenoendemic to Bosnia and Herzegovina. It is described in the canyon of Sutjeska river, on the rocks porters, and it covers the Vrtar Maglić, and Zelengora.

- Locus classicus is in canyon of Sutjeska river, Bosna i Hercegovina.
