= Christophe Moehrlen =

Swiss pastor and writer

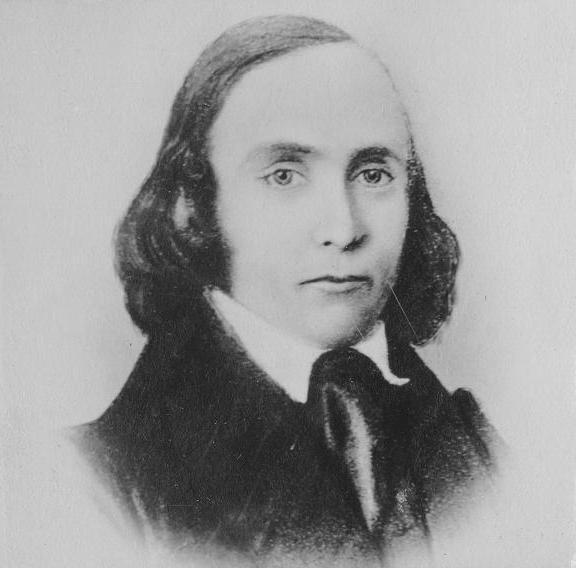
- Born: 20 January 1800; Baiersbronn, Württemberg
- Died: 28 February 1871 (aged 71); Daillens, Switzerland
- Occupations: Schoolteacher, writer
- Writing career
- Genres: Children's literature, Christian literature

Christophe Moehrlen (20 January 1800 – 28 February 1871), pen name: Christoph Irenius, was a Swiss French Protestant pastor of German origin, schoolteacher and author of children's literature.

== Biography ==
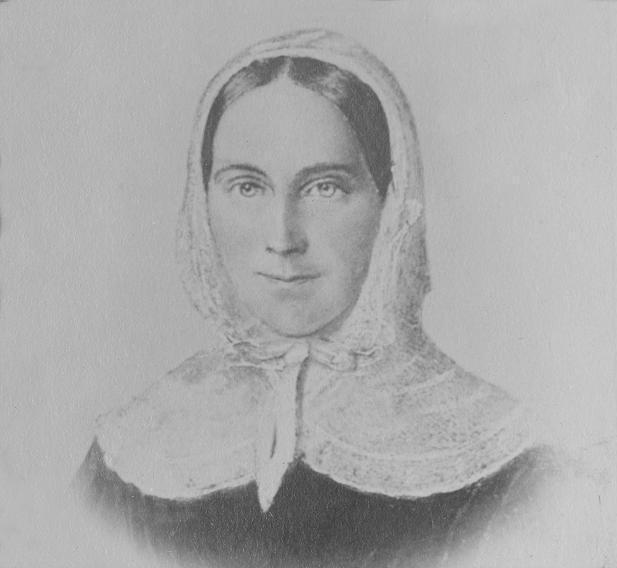
Christophe Moehrlen's wife: Röschen Friedenauer

Moehrlen was teacher at the Evangelical College in Schiers, at the poorhouse Calame in Le Locle and at Christian Friedrich Spittler′s Griechenanstalt in Beuggen. He later worked as a pastor in Payerne, where he founded a reformatory for boys, and finally in Daillens. In addition to some educational works and translations, he published in 1839, under the pseudonym Christoph Irenius the autobiographical book Eine wahrhafte Geschichte ("A true story").

Moehrlen was the father-in-law of Otto Sutermeister.

== Selected works ==
- Christoph Irenius: Eine wahrhafte Geschichte. Autobiography. Basel, 1839.
- Geschichte der Waldenser: von ihrem Ursprunge an bis auf unsere Zeit. Basel: Bahnmaier's Buchhandlung, C. Detloff, 1844. 99 pages.
- Das Buch der Wahrheitszeugen oder der theuern protestantisch-evangelischen Kirche ununterbrochene Fortdauer in allen Jahrhunderten. Geschichtserzählungen für Schule und Haus. 2 Volumes, Basel 1844–1845 (Volume 1 and Volume 2 at Munich Digitization Center)
- Histoire biblique pour les écoles et les familles. Translation from German to French. Payerne: Louis Gueissaz, 1850–60.

== Secondary literature ==
- Marie Dedie-Moehrlen. Une belle vie: la vie de mon grand-père, le pasteur Christophe Moehrlen, 1800–1871. Neuchâtel: Impr. P. Attinger S.A., 1936. 199 pages.
- Olivier Dedie (editor). Le dernier journal du pasteur Christophe Moehrlen. (from 1866 to 1869) Rolle: Société d'histoire de la Côte, 1987. 32 pages.
