= Edwin Sutermeister =

American chemist (1876–1958)

Edwin Lewis Sutermeister
- Born: 1876
- Died: 1958 (aged 81–82)
- Citizenship: American
- Known for: his work on chemistry of paper making
- Scientific career
- Fields: Chemistry

Edwin Lewis Sutermeister (1876–1958) was an American chemist who is best known for his work on papermaking.

== Biography ==
Edwin Lewis Sutermeister was born in 1876 to Emmanuel Sutermeister and Harriet Georgianna Davenport. His sister was photographer Margaret Sutermeister.

Sutermeister's best known work is The Story of Paper Making, the result of experience during his twenty years' service as chemist in the industry.

== Bibliography ==
- The Story Of Papermaking. Kessinger Publishing, LLC, 2009 ISBN 978-1-104-84951-1
- Casein and its industrial applications. New York: Reinhold publishing corporation, 1939.
- Chemistry of Pulp and Paper Making. New York: Wiley, 1920. ASIN B002MRQC2Y
