= Arnold Sutermeister =

Union army officer (1830–1907)

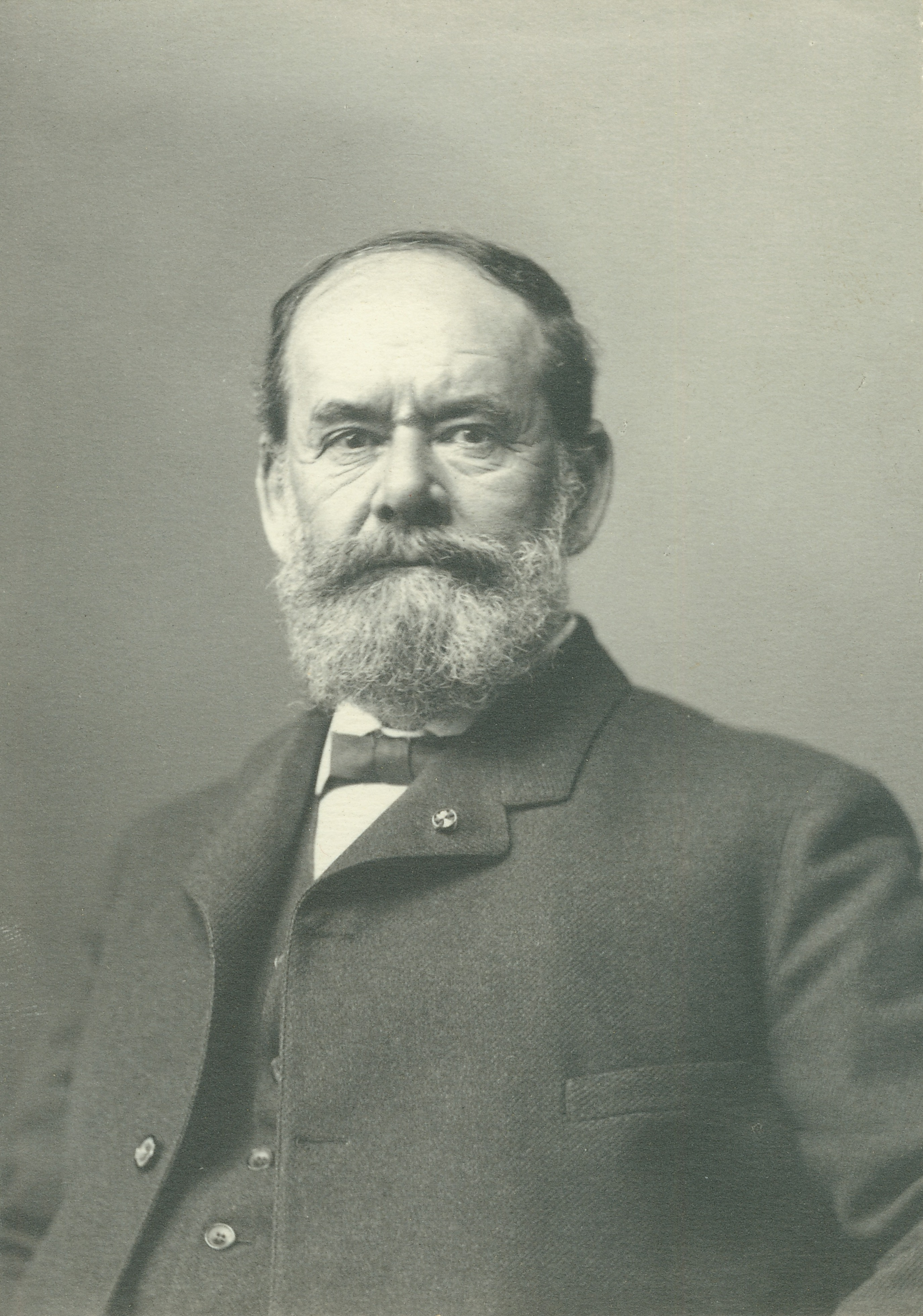
- Born: July 11, 1830; Zofingen, Switzerland
- Died: May 3, 1907 (aged 76); Missouri, U.S.
- Burial place: Elmwood Cemetery; Kansas City, Missouri, U.S.
- Spouse: Louise Johanna Leibnitz (m. 1860)
- Military career
- Allegiance: United States
- Branch: Union Army
- Service years: 1861–1865
- Rank: Captain
- Conflicts: American Civil War; Siege of Corinth; Battle of Chickamauga; Chattanooga campaign; Atlanta campaign

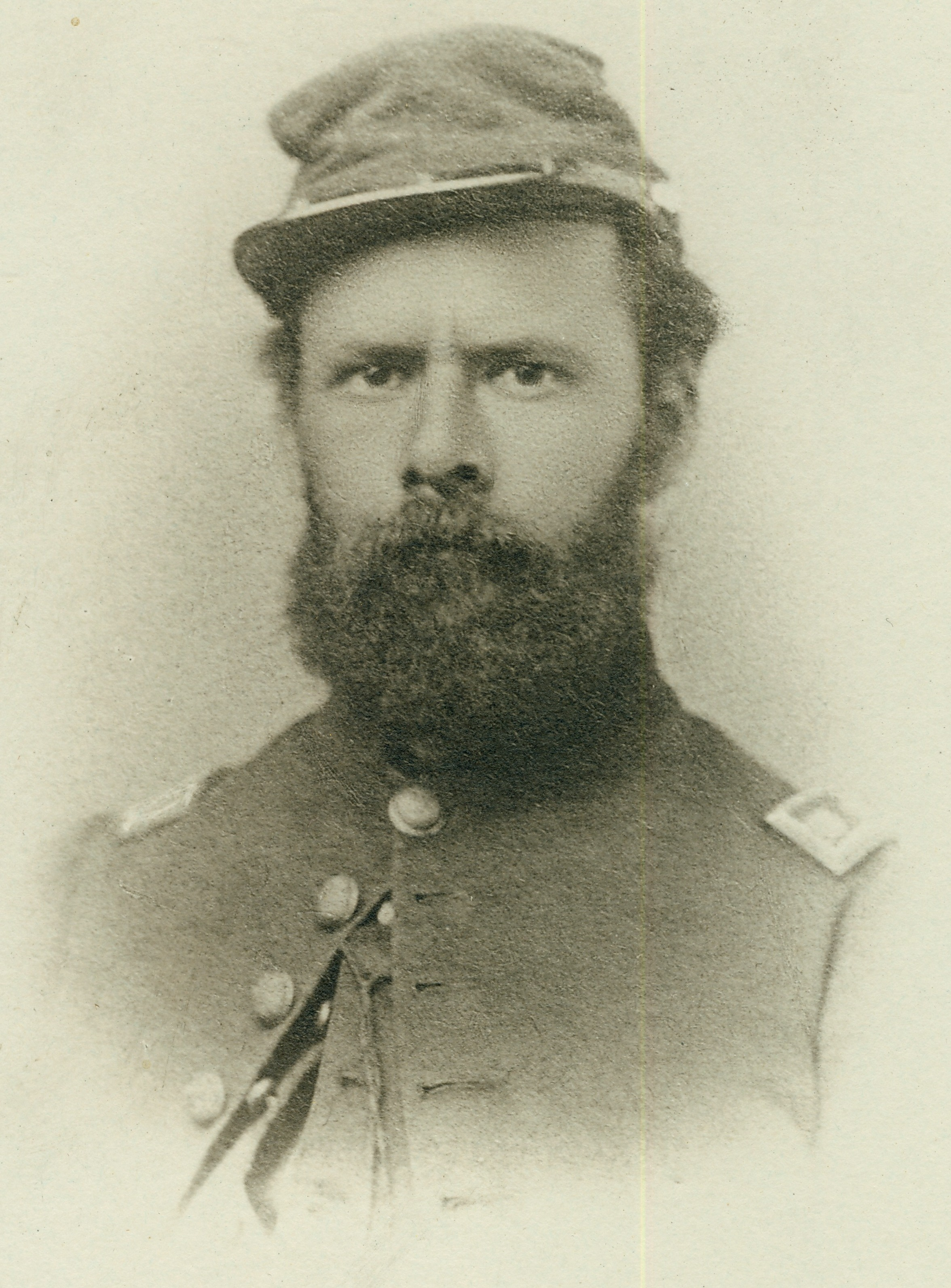
Arnold Sutermeister in 1864

Arnold Sutermeister (July 11, 1830 – May 3, 1907) was a Swiss-born American businessman, contractor, sculptor, architect and military officer who served as Captain in the American Civil War, where he commanded an artillery battery in the Western Theater.

He established the American branch of the Sutermeister family.

== Early life and education ==
Sutermeister was born July 11, 1830 in Zofingen, Switzerland, the third of four children, to Gottlieb Sutermeister (1801–1840) and Anna Margret Sutermeister (née Hemmann; born 1792), into a Protestant family. His surviving siblings were; Frank Sutermeister (né Franz Sutermeister; 1822–1902) and Caroline Zimmerli (née Sutermeister; born 1824).

Sutermeister studied architecture in Bern and Basel. After the death of his father, the family emigrated to the United States in 1846, settling in Boston, Massachusetts. In 1857, Sutermeister made way to Fort Wayne, Indiana, where he worked as a mathematics teacher.

== Civil War ==
When the American Civil War began Sutermeister joined the Union army as Captain of the 11th Independent Battery Indiana Light Artillery, which he had recruited in Fort Wayne, on December 17, 1861. He commanded the battery for three years. Serving in the Western Theater in 1862 and 1863, he fought in the Siege of Corinth, the Battle of Chickamauga, and in the Chattanooga campaign, specifically at the battles of Orchard Knob and Missionary Ridge. His battery won special distinction at Chickamauga.

During the Atlanta campaign in 1864, Sutermeister served on the staff of Major-general George H. Thomas and commanded the siege artillery of the Army of the Cumberland. He also saw action in the following battles: Buzzard's Roost, Resaca, Dallas, New Hope Church, Kenesaw Mountain, and Atlanta. He is favourably mentioned in the report of Brigadier-general John M. Brannan to Thomas dated September 14, 1864:

The chiefs of artillery of corps have shown energy, efficiency, skill, and courage equal to any officers in the service. I call your attention to the reports of corps chiefs relative to subordinates. Capt. A. Sutermeister, Eleventh Indiana Battery, being attached to your headquarters under your own supervision, you are aware of the efficient and zealous manner he and his company have performed their part in the campaign, both with the 20-pounder Parrotts and 4 1/2-inch guns.

Sutermeister was also a talented draughtsman, and often sent drawings of the battlefield home to his wife. He was mustered out with his unit on January 7, 1865, and returned to civilian life.

After the war ended Sutermeister went back to Fort Wayne and then moved to Kansas City, Missouri, where he started a construction business.

== Personal life ==
In 1860, Sutermeister married German-born Louisa Johanna Leibnitz (1836–1906), a daughter of Carl Leibnitz and Anna Julianna Leibnitz (née Imhof), at the house of Hugh McCulloch in Fort Wayne, Indiana. Through her paternal family she was a direct descendant of Gottfried Wilhelm Leibnitz after whom Leibnitz Prize was named, while her mother was Swiss. They had eight children;

- Louisa M. Sutermeister (1861–1942), married to widower Silas Charles Delap (1846–1931), they had five children.
- Julia A. Sutermeister (1865–1947), never married and without issue.
- Charles Oscar Sutermeister (1867–1937), a noted urban planner, married Julia Louise Morey (1870–1957), three children including Robert A. Sutermeister.
- Arnold H. Sutermeister (1869–1918), an economist, married to Caroline Kreischer (born 1873), had two children.
- Herman August Sutermeister (1871–1962), married to Anna Letah Holliway (1874–1950), two children.
- Bertha E. Sutermeister (1874–1952), married Ernest Merritt (1866–1944), five children.
- Edey M. Sutermeister (1878–1929), never married and without issue.
- Paul Arthur Sutermeister (1880–1929), married Agnes Holliway (1881–1968), three children. He was the grandfather of Martha L. Ludwig.

He died on May 3, 1907, in his seventy-seventh year, and was buried in Elmwood Cemetery. He left an estate valued at $15,000 (approximately $550,000 in modern equivalency).
