= Paul Sutermeister =

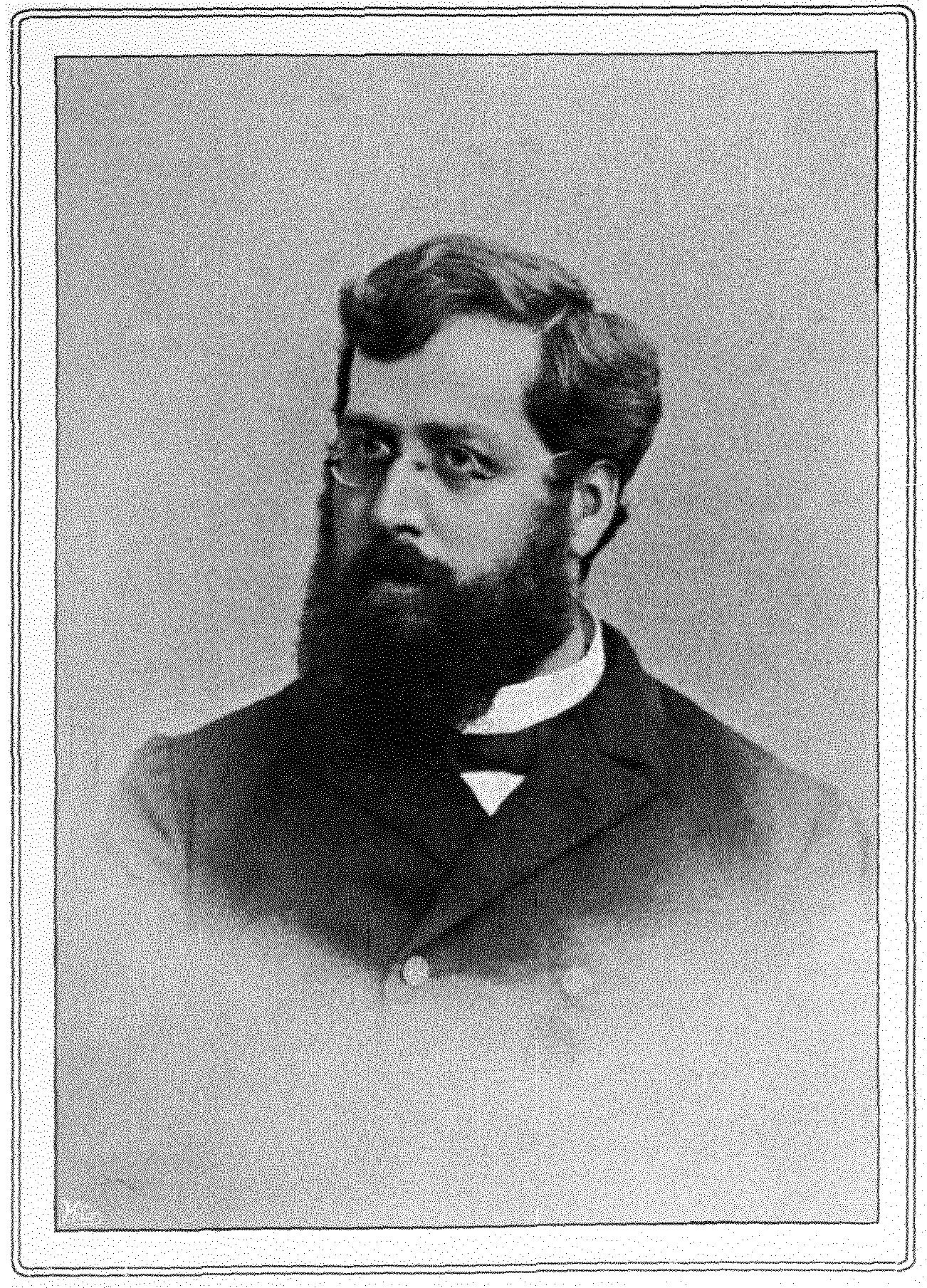
- One of Paul Sutermeister's most well-known portraits
- Born: 6 June 1864; Küsnacht, Switzerland
- Died: 2 February 1905 (aged 40); Bern, Switzerland
- Occupations: Pastor and writer
- Writing career
- Notable work: Der Dorfkaiser

Paul Sutermeister (6 June 1864, in Küsnacht – 2 February 1905, in Bern) was a Swiss theologian, pastor and contributing editor of the Berner Tagblatt.

== Biography ==
Paul Sutermeister's father was Otto Sutermeister; his family came from Zofingen. He attended high school in Berne and studied theology at the universities of Basel and Göttingen. He began his sermon in the Appenzell region. “His popular book ‘Der Dorfkaiser’, in which he criticized sharply the lottery and the ruthless exploitation of vulnerable people by the village magnate [...] costed him his job as a pastor in Walzenhausen and led him to the activity in the daily press.” As foreign editor Sutermeister came to the Berner Tagblatt, “edited the Saturday supplement, Berner Heim, and concerned the coverage of concerts and clubs.” For some time he was editor-in-chief of the weekly magazine Fürs Schweizerhaus and later of the Basel published Christian entertainment magazine Fürs Heim.” “As a writer, Sutermeister showed an insightful and intimate view of our national life, without overlooking its dark side.” Sutermeister died of pneumonia. He was married to Mathilde Fontannaz and had children.

== Bibliography ==
- Der Dorfkaiser. Vollmann, Zurich 1898 (Verein für Verbreitung guter Schriften, Zürich. Vol. 29). (Reprint: EOD Network, 2011. ISBN 978-3-226-00188-4 )
- Ein Vierteljahrhundert Missionsarbeit im südlichen Afrika: Züge aus der Mission romande. Georg Bridel, Lausanne 1898.
- Meta Heusser-Schweizer: Lebensbild einer christlichen Dichterin. Basel 1898 (Reben am Weinstock. Vol. 8). (Reprint: EOD Network, 2011. ISBN 978-3-226-00872-2 )
- Burenfrauen: Épisode aus dem Burenkriege. Free translation from a drama of Virgile Rossel. Buchdruckerei des Berner Tagblatts, Bern 1901. (Reprint: EOD Network, 2011. ISBN 978-3-226-00938-5 )

== Secondary Literature ==
- † Paul Sutermeister. In: Der Bund, 56. Jahrgang, Nr. 60, 5 February 1905.
- Zum Andenken an Herrn Pfarrer Paul Sutermeister, Redaktor: Gestorben am 2 February 1905. Bern: Buchdruckerei des Berner Tagblatt, 1905. 22 pages. With contributions by pastor Baumgartner, Johannes Howald and H. Hugendubel. (Reprint: EOD Network, 2011. ISBN 978-3-226-00947-7 ) (Online)
