= Robert A. Sutermeister =

American economist

- Born: 25 August 1913; Kansas City, Missouri
- Died: 12 May 2008 (aged 94); Seattle, Washington

Academic background
- Education: Harvard University

Academic work
- Discipline: Productivity; Management
- Institutions: University of Washington
- Notable ideas: Production theory

Robert Arnold Sutermeister (August 25, 1913 – May 12, 2008) was an American microeconomist.

== Life ==
Sutermeister was a grandson of Civil War Captain Arnold Sutermeister. He got his AB in Economics at Harvard University in 1934 and his MA at University of Washington. Once married, he had three children born in the 1950s (the two oldest were girls, named Sue and Jan, the youngest was a boy, named Jack), but was later divorced from his wife (Miriam, who later remarried) after Jack left home for college. Sutermeister was also a heavy proponent of honesty and hard work, and valued education highly.

From 1949 to 1981 he was professor of management and organization at University of Washington. Sutermeister spent his final years living in the Emerald Heights retirement home, in Seattle. He enjoyed hiking on Mount Rainier, camping and canoeing. He continued to have excellent physical health, apart from hypertension, and stayed active until dying at the age of 94. This love of the outdoors especially influenced and was passed on to his middle daughter, Jan. When he died in 2008, he was survived by three children, and six grandchildren. As of 2017, he is also survived by two great-grandchildren. His ashes were scattered at the top of Mount Rainier by his three children.

His book People and Productivity of 1963 is considered a cornerstone of production theory and has been re-edited several times as well as translated into different languages.

== Bibliography ==
- People and productivity. New York: McGraw-Hill, 1976. ISBN 978-0-07-062371-2 .

- William J. Jaffe: Book review in Technology and Culture, Vol. 5, No. 3 (Summer, 1964), pp. 475-477.
- Albert Bernard Cherns: Book review in Ergonomics, pp. 341-343.

- Human Motivation in the Smaller Enterprise. With B. O. Saxberg, 1974.
