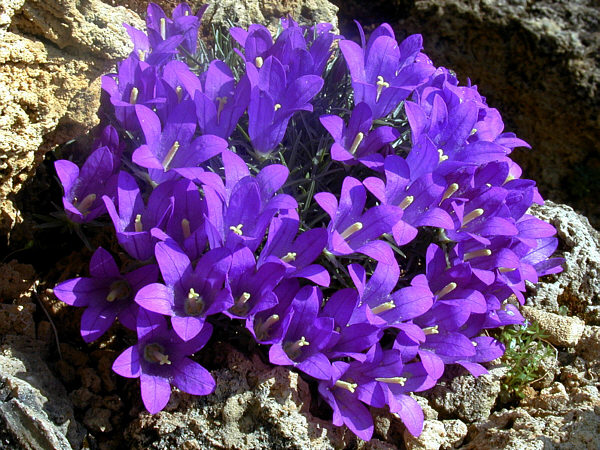
- Muehlbergella oweriniana

Conservation status
- Critically Endangered (IUCN 3.1)

Scientific classification
- Kingdom: Plantae
- Clade: Tracheophytes
- Clade: Angiosperms
- Clade: Eudicots
- Clade: Asterids
- Order: Asterales
- Family: Campanulaceae
- Subfamily: Campanuloideae
- Genus: Muehlbergella; Feer (1890)
- Species: M. oweriniana

Binomial name
- Muehlbergella oweriniana (Rupr.) Feer (1890)

Synonyms
- Edraianthus owerinianus (Rupr.) Boiss. (1875); Hedranthus owerinianus Rupr. (1867)

= Muehlbergella =

Species of flowering plant

Muehlbergella is a monotypic genus of flowering plants in the family Campanulaceae. It contains a single species, Muehlbergella oweriniana. It is critically endangered.

== Distribution ==
The species is endemic to an area of ~40 km^{2} in Dagestan, North Caucasus, where it grows between cracks and calcareous rocky ground.

== Taxonomy ==
The genus and species were both described by Heinrich Feer and published in Botanische Jahrbücher für Systematik, Pflanzengeschichte und Pflanzengeographie Vol.12 (Issue 5) on pages 615–616 in 1890.

The genus name of Muehlbergella is in honour of Friedrich Mühlberg (1840–1915), a Swiss geologist. The Latin specific epithet of oweriniana refers to the original collector, Alexander Pavlovic Owerin, a Russian military topographer, florist, and botanical collector. Owerin had collected plants from the mountains of Dagestan (1860–61) and other places in the Caucasus.
