= Romeo und Julia (Sutermeister opera) =

Opera by Heinrich Sutermeister

Romeo und Julia is an opera in two acts by Heinrich Sutermeister. The composer wrote the libretto, after Shakespeare's Romeo and Juliet.

Erik Levi explains that the opera: "presents a synthesis of Romantic and impressionist elements. It marks a ... return to the conception of opera as a sequence of closed forms, incorporating ... stylistic features related to madrigal, oratorio and pantomime."

== Performance history ==
It was first performed on 13 April 1940, at the Semperoper, Dresden, under the musical direction of Karl Böhm, who also commissioned the work, with Maria Cebotari as Julia, and was a considerable success. It was also performed at Sadler's Wells in London on 12 March 1953, conducted by James Robertson.

== Roles ==
Role	Voice type	Premiere cast, 13 April 1940 (Conductor: Karl Böhm)
Julia, daughter of the Capulets	soprano	Maria Cebotari
Romeo, son of Montague	tenor	
Balthasar, Romeo's servant	baritone	
Nurse	soprano	Inger Karén
Capuleti (Capulet)	bass	Kurt Böhme
Countess Capuleti (Lady Capulet)	contralto	Helena Rott
Father Lorenzo (Friar Laurence)	bass	Sven Nilsson
Escalus, Prince of Verona	baritone	
Servant	tenor	
Montague, Romeo's father	spoken	
Count Paris	ballerina	

== Synopsis ==
Sutermeister's version follows Shakespeare's plot. In the final scene, a celestial chorus celebrate the union in death of the two lovers.

== Recordings ==
Sutermeister: Romeo und Julia – Bavarian Radio Chorus, Tölzer Knabenchor, Munich Radio Orchestra

- Conductor: Heinz Wallberg
- Principal singers: Ferry Gruber, Raimund Grumbach, Nikolaus Hillebrand, Urszula Koszut, Hildegard Laurich, Theodor Nicolai, Adolf Dallapozza, Paul Hansen, Alexander Malta, Gudrun Wewezow, Joern W. Wilsing, Heinrich Weber, Anton Rosner
- Recording date: 1980?
- Label: Musiques Suisses – 6263 (2 CDs)

== Sources ==
- Casaglia, Gherardo (2005)."Romeo und Julia, 13 April 1940". L'Almanacco di Gherardo Casaglia (in Italian).
- Levi, Erik (2002) [print 1992]. "Romeo und Julia". Grove Music Online (8th ed.). Oxford University Press. doi:10.1093/gmo/9781561592630.article.O007781. ISBN 978-1-56159-263-0. (subscription, Wikilibrary access, or UK public library membership required)
- "Opera: Stage and Film". The Musical Times. 94 (1323): 227–228. 1953. doi:10.2307/933399. eISSN 2397-5318. ISSN 0027-4666. JSTOR 933399.
- "Sadler's Wells". The Tatler: 17. 25 March 1953.
