= Werner Sutermeister =

Swiss writer

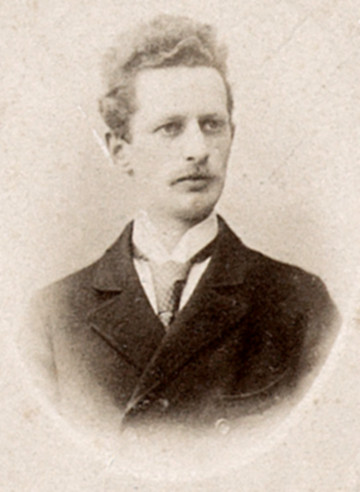
- Werner Sutermeister, around 1896
- Born: Missing required parameter 1=month! 1868; Zofingen, Argovia, Switzerland
- Died: 19 April 1939 (aged 70–71); Switzerland
- Occupations: poet, novelist
- Writing career
- Language: German
- Notable works: Der Schüttelbecher; Der fröhliche Apfelbaum

Werner Sutermeister (1868–1939) is a Swiss writer well known for his spoonerisms.

== Life ==
Werner Sutermeister was a son of Ernestine Moehrlen and Otto Sutermeister. attended Gymnasium Kirchenfeld in Bern. He then studied history, German philology and philosophy in Basel, Leipzig and Bern. In 1891 he became a teacher for secondary schools. 1894 he promoted with a dissertation about Klemens von Metternich’s relationship to Switzerland between 1840 and 1848.

For six years he worked as a teacher at the girls' school of Bern. In the spring of 1900 he was elected to the Gymnasium of Bern, where he taught History and German for 37 years. He also directed the orchestra of the Gymnasium.

Sutermeister also wrote for the Bernese daily newspaper Der Bund:

He was a master of light-headed philosophy, and he shook the kaleidoscope of the German language to delight himself and the mischievous coincidences of his rhymes. So he has brought some cheerful, but also some thoughtful note in our newspaper text.
