= Aarau =

- Municipality
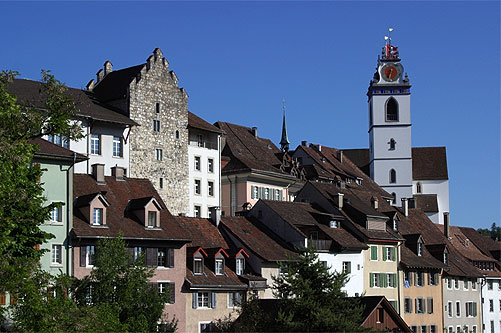
- Aarau old town

- Flag Coat of arms
- Location of Aarau
- Location within Switzerland Location within Canton of Aargau
- Coordinates: 47°24′N 8°03′E
- Country: Switzerland
- Canton: Aargau
- District: Aarau

Government
  - Executive: Stadtrat with 7 members
  - Mayor: Stadtpräsident (list); Hanspeter Hilfiker FDP/PRD (as of February 2018)
  - Parliament: Einwohnerrat with 50 members

Area
  - Total: 12.34 km^{2} (4.76 sq mi)
- Elevation: 381 m (1,250 ft)
- Highest elevation (Hungerberg): 471 m (1,545 ft)
- Lowest elevation (Aar): 365 m (1,198 ft)

Population (December 2020)
  - Total: 21,726
  - Density: 1,761/km^{2} (4,560/sq mi)
- Demonym: German: Aarauer(in)
- Time zone: UTC+01:00 (CET)
  - Summer (DST): UTC+02:00 (CEST)
- Postal codes: 5000, 5004 Aarau, 5032 Aarau Rohr
- SFOS number: 4001
- ISO 3166 code: CH-AG
- Localities: Aarau
- Surrounded by: Buchs, Suhr, Unterentfelden, Eppenberg-Wöschnau, Erlinsbach
- Twin towns: Neuchâtel (Switzerland), Delft (Netherlands), Reutlingen (Germany)
- Website: aarau.ch

Aarau (Swiss Standard German: [ˈaːraʊ], Alemannic German pronunciation: [ˈɑːræu̯]) is a town, a municipality, and the capital of the northern Swiss canton of Aargau. The town is also the capital of the district of Aarau. It is German-speaking and predominantly Protestant. Aarau is situated on the Swiss Plateau, in the valley of the Aare, on the river's right bank, and at the southern foot of the Jura Mountains, and is west of Zurich, 58 kilometres (36 miles) south of Basel and 65 kilometres (40 miles) northeast of Bern. The municipality borders directly on the canton of Solothurn to the west. It is the largest town in Aargau. At the beginning of 2010 Rohr became a district of Aarau.

== Geography and geology ==
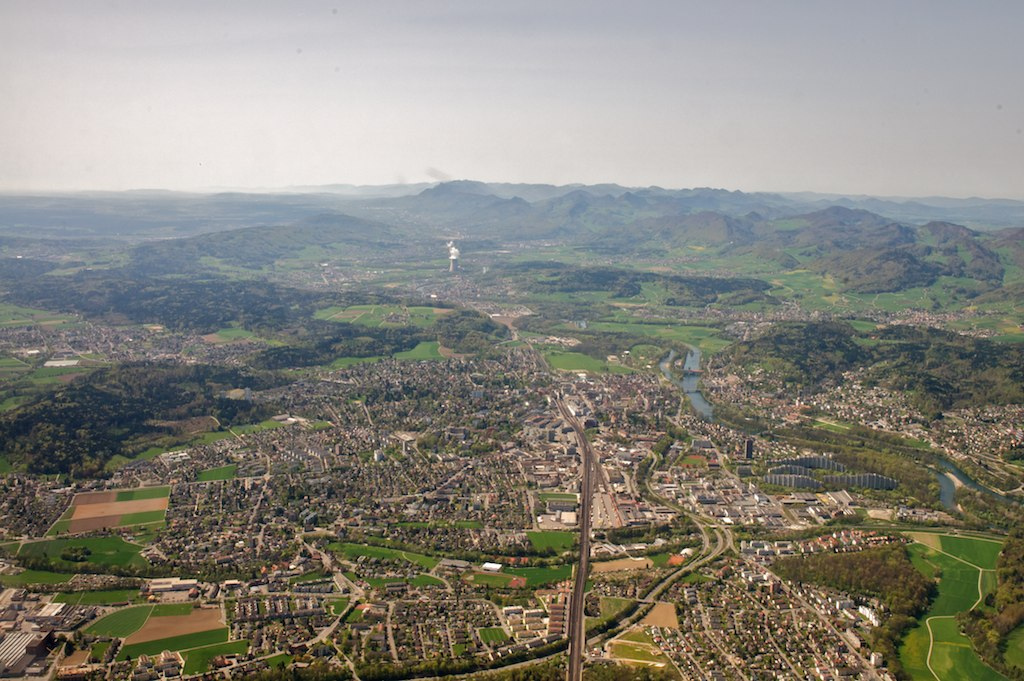
Aarau and the Jura Mountains

The old city of Aarau is situated on a rocky outcrop at a narrowing of the Aare river valley, at the southern foot of the Jura Mountains. Newer districts of the city lie to the south and east of the outcrop, as well as higher up the mountain, and in the valley on both sides of the Aare. The neighboring municipalities are Küttigen to the north and Buchs to the east, Suhr to the south-east, Unterentfelden to the south, and Eppenberg-Wöschnau and Erlinsbach to the west. Aarau and the nearby neighboring municipalities have grown together and now form an interconnected agglomeration. The only exception is Unterentfelden whose settlements are divided from Aarau by the extensive forests of Gönhard and Zelgli. Approximately nine-tenths of the city is south of the Aare, and one tenth is to the north. It has an area, as of 2006, of 8.9 km^{2} (3.4 sq mi). Of this area, 6.3% is used for agricultural purposes, while 34% is forested. Of the rest of the land, 55.2% is settled (buildings or roads) and the remainder (4.5%) is non-productive (rivers or lakes). The lowest elevation, 365 meters (1,198 ft), is found at the banks of the Aar, and the highest elevation, at 471 meters (1,545 ft), is the Hungerberg on the border with Küttigen.

=== Climate ===
Climate data for Aarau, elevation 387 m (1,270 ft), (1991–2020)
Month	Jan	Feb	Mar	Apr	May	Jun	Jul	Aug	Sep	Oct	Nov	Dec	Year
Mean daily maximum °C (°F)	3.9 (39.0)	5.9 (42.6)	11.1 (52.0)	15.6 (60.1)	19.6 (67.3)	23.5 (74.3)	25.6 (78.1)	25.0 (77.0)	20.2 (68.4)	14.5 (58.1)	8.0 (46.4)	4.3 (39.7)	14.8 (58.6)
Daily mean °C (°F)	1.2 (34.2)	1.9 (35.4)	5.9 (42.6)	9.9 (49.8)	14.0 (57.2)	17.7 (63.9)	19.4 (66.9)	18.8 (65.8)	14.6 (58.3)	10.1 (50.2)	5.0 (41.0)	1.9 (35.4)	10.0 (50.0)
Mean daily minimum °C (°F)	−1.5 (29.3)	−1.7 (28.9)	1.2 (34.2)	4.3 (39.7)	8.5 (47.3)	12.1 (53.8)	13.6 (56.5)	13.5 (56.3)	9.8 (49.6)	6.5 (43.7)	2.3 (36.1)	−0.5 (31.1)	5.7 (42.3)
Average precipitation mm (inches)	63.1 (2.48)	52.6 (2.07)	61.3 (2.41)	63.2 (2.49)	98.5 (3.88)	92.2 (3.63)	98.4 (3.87)	98.3 (3.87)	69.6 (2.74)	72.0 (2.83)	69.1 (2.72)	81.4 (3.20)	919.7 (36.21)
Average snowfall cm (inches)	7.7 (3.0)	8.6 (3.4)	3.0 (1.2)	0.1 (0.0)	0.0 (0.0)	0.0 (0.0)	0.0 (0.0)	0.0 (0.0)	0.0 (0.0)	0.2 (0.1)	2.5 (1.0)	9.5 (3.7)	31.6 (12.4)
Average precipitation days (≥ 1.0 mm)	9.6	8.6	9.5	10.2	11.6	11.3	10.9	11.2	8.5	10.1	9.8	11.6	122.9
Average snowy days	2.8	2.5	1.1	0.1	0.0	0.0	0.0	0.0	0.0	0.1	0.7	2.4	9.7
Average relative humidity (%)	83	79	73	69	72	72	71	75	80	85	86	85	78
Mean monthly sunshine hours	41.2	74.2	133.2	166.8	180.6	200.2	219.8	204.1	148.7	86.3	42.8	31.1	1,529
Percentage possible sunshine	19	30	40	45	43	48	52	51	44	29	19	15	39
Source 1: NOAA
Source 2: MeteoSwiss

== History ==
=== Prehistory ===
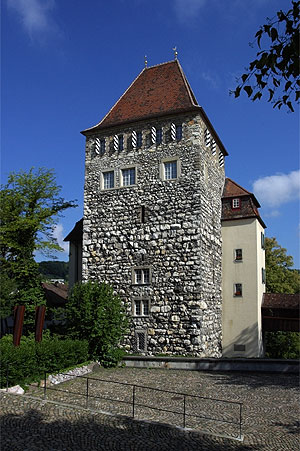
Schlössli

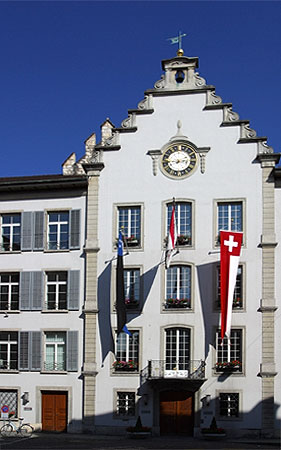
City Hall

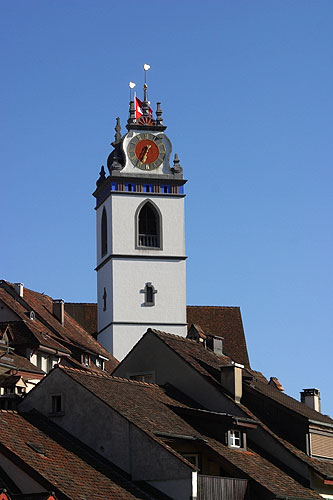
Town Church Tower

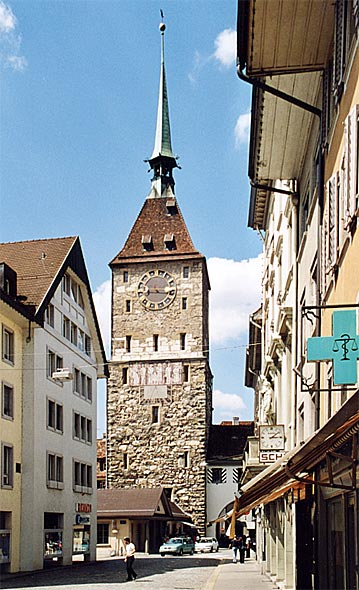
Upper Gate Tower

A few artifacts from the Neolithic period were found in Aarau. Near the location of the present train station, the ruins of a settlement from the Bronze Age (about 1000 BC) have been excavated. The Roman road between Salodurum (Solothurn) and Vindonissa passed through the area, along the route now covered by the Bahnhofstrasse. In 1976 divers in the Aare found part of a seven-meter wide wooden bridge from the late Roman times.

=== Middle Ages ===
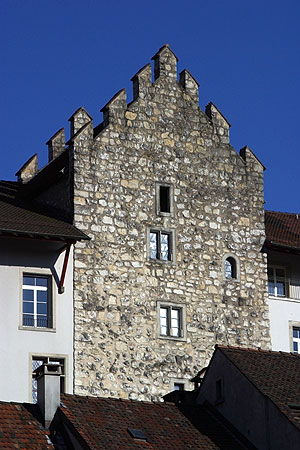
Rore Tower

Aarau was founded around AD 1240 by the counts of Kyburg. Aarau is first mentioned in 1248 as Arowe. Around 1250 it was mentioned as Arowa. However the first mention of a city sized settlement was in 1256. The town was ruled from the "Rore" tower, which has been incorporated into the modern city hall.

In 1273 the counts of Kyburg died out. Agnes of Kyburg, who had no male relations, sold the family's lands to King Rudolf I von Habsburg. He granted Aarau its city rights in 1283. In the 14th century the city was expanded in two stages, and a second defensive wall was constructed. A deep ditch separated the city from its "suburb;" its location is today marked by a wide street named "Graben" (meaning Ditch).

In 1415 Bern invaded lower Aargau with the help of Solothurn. Aarau capitulated after a short resistance, and was forced to swear allegiance to the new rulers. In the 16th century, the rights of the lower classes were abolished. In March 1528 the citizens of Aarau allowed the introduction of Protestantism at the urging of the Bernese. A growth in population during the 16th Century led to taller buildings and denser construction methods. Early forms of industry developed at this time; however, unlike in other cities, no guilds were formed in Aarau.

On 11 August 1712, the Peace of Aarau was signed into effect. This granted each canton the right to choose their own religion thereby ending Catholicism's control. Starting in the early 18th century, the textile industry was established in Aarau. German immigration contributed to the city's favorable conditions, in that they introduced the cotton and silk factories. These highly educated immigrants were also responsible for educational reform and the enlightened, revolutionary spirit that developed in Aarau.

=== 1798: Capital of the Helvetic Republic ===
On 27 December 1797, the last Tagsatzung of the Old Swiss Confederacy was held in Aarau. Two weeks later a French envoy continued to foment the revolutionary opinions of the city. The contrast between a high level of education and a low level of political rights was particularly great in Aarau, and the city refused to send troops to defend the Bernese border. By Mid-March 1798 Aarau was occupied by French troops.

On 22 March 1798 Aarau was declared the capital of the Helvetic Republic. It is therefore the first capital of a unified Switzerland. Parliament met in the city hall. On 20 September, the capital was moved to Lucerne.

=== Aarau as canton capital ===
Aerial view (1958)

In 1803, Napoleon ordered the fusion of the cantons of Aargau, Baden and Fricktal. Aarau was declared the capital of the new, enlarged canton of Aargau. In 1820 the city wall was torn down, with the exception of the individual towers and gates, and the defensive ditches were filled in.

The wooden bridge, dating from the Middle Ages, across the Aare was destroyed by floods three times in thirty years, and was replaced with a steel suspension bridge in 1851. This was replaced by a concrete bridge in 1952. The city was linked up to the Swiss Central Railway in 1856.

The textile industry in Aarau broke down in about 1850 because of the protectionist tariff policies of neighboring states. Other industries had developed by that time to replace it, including the production of mathematical instruments, shoes and cement. Beginning in 1900, numerous electrical enterprises developed. By the 1960s, more citizens worked in service industries or for the canton-level government than in manufacturing. During the 1980s many of the industries left Aarau completely.

In 1802 the Canton School was established; it was the first non-parochial high school in Switzerland. It developed a good reputation, and was home to Nobel Prize winners Albert Einstein, Paul Karrer, and Werner Arber, as well as several Swiss politicians and authors.

The purchase of a manuscript collection in 1803 laid the foundation for what would become the Cantonal Library, which contains a Bible annotated by Huldrych Zwingli, along with the manuscripts and incunabula. More newspapers developed in the city, maintaining the revolutionary atmosphere of Aarau. Beginning in 1820, Aarau has been a refuge for political refugees.

The urban educational and cultural opportunities of Aarau were extended through numerous new institutions. A Theatre and Concert Hall was constructed in 1883, which was renovated and expanded in 1995–96. The Aargau Nature Museum opened in 1922. A former cloth warehouse was converted into a small theatre in 1974, and the alternative culture center KIFF (Culture in the fodder factory) was established in a former animal fodder factory.

=== 2026 rave shooting ===
On 30 August 2026, at a local rave, a 22-year-old woman was killed and five people were injured, one seriously. Cartridges found at the crime scene were of two different calibres, suggesting that a pistol and a second, larger firearm may have been used.

== Origin of the name ==
The earliest use of the place name was in 1248 (in the form Arowe), and probably referred to the settlement in the area before the founding of the city. It comes, along with the name of the River Aare (which was called Arula, Arola, and Araris in early times), from the German word Au, meaning floodplain.

=== Old town ===
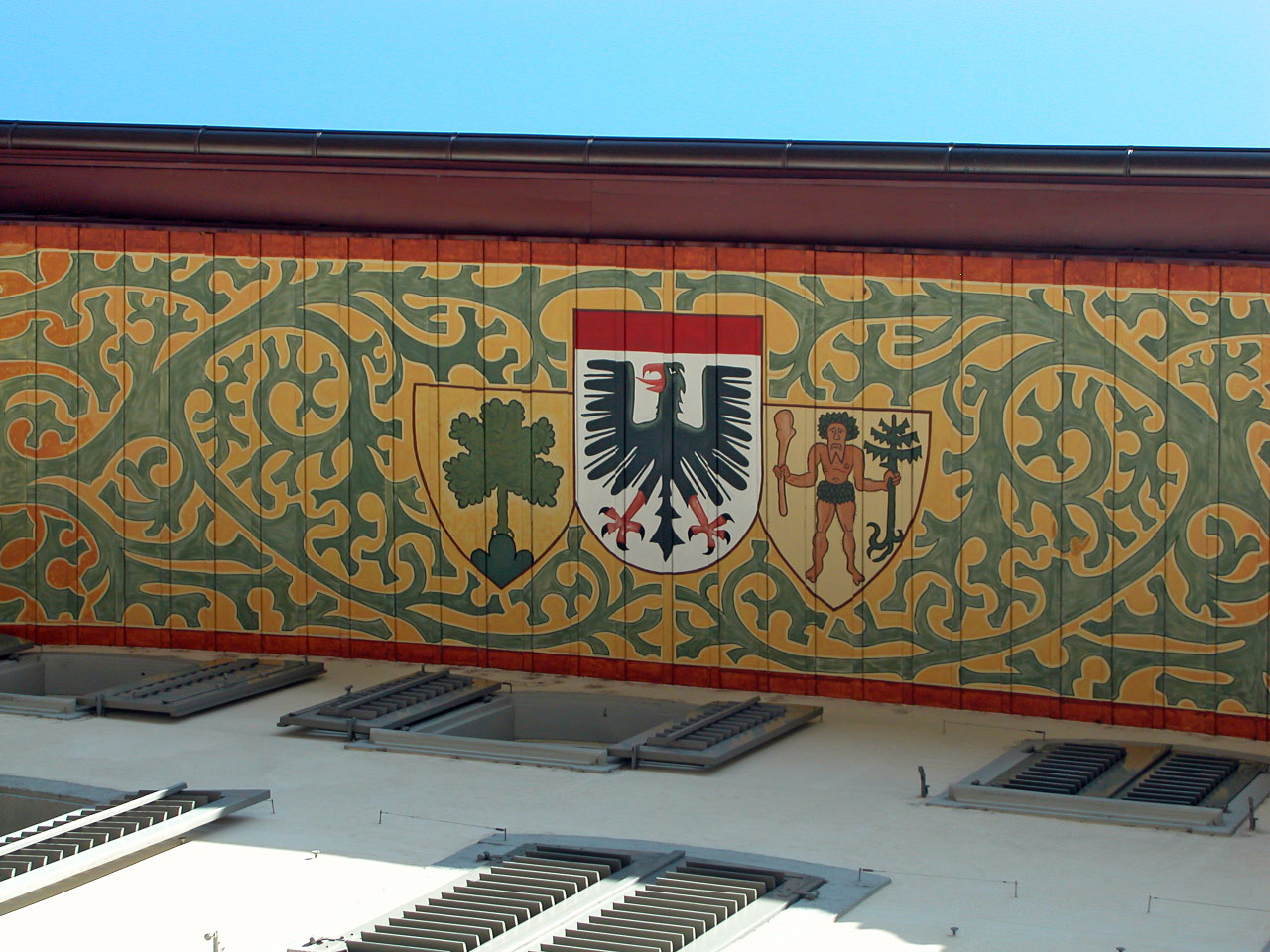
Painted Gable

The historic old town forms an irregular square, consisting of four parts (called Stöcke). To the south lies the Laurenzenvorstadt, that is, the part of the town formerly outside the city wall. One characteristic of the city is its painted gables, for which Aarau is sometimes called the "City of beautiful Gables". The old town, Laurenzenvorstadt, government building, cantonal library, state archive and art museum are all listed as heritage sites of national significance.

The buildings in the old city originate, on the whole, from building projects during the 16th century, when nearly all the Middle Age period buildings were replaced or expanded. The architectural development of the city ended in the 18th century, when the city began to expand beyond its (still existing) wall. Most of the buildings in the "suburb" date from this time.

The "Schlössli" (small Castle), Rore Tower and the upper gate tower have remained nearly unchanged since the 13th century. The "Schlössli" is the oldest building in the city. It was already founded at the time of the establishment of the city shortly after 1200; the exact date is not known. City hall was built around Rore Tower in 1515.

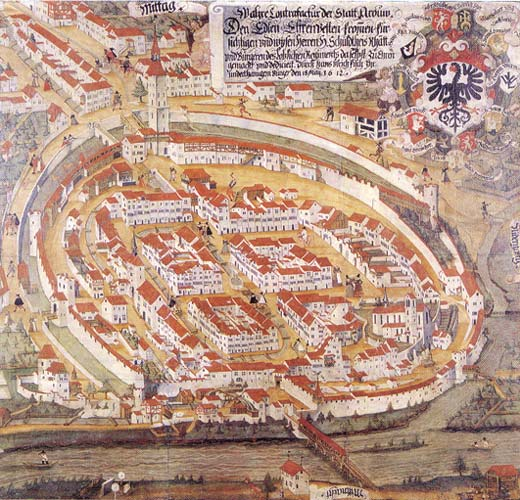
View of Aarau from 1612

The upper gate tower stands beside the southern gate in the city wall, along the road to Lucerne and Bern. The jail has been housed in it since the Middle Ages. A Carillon was installed in the tower in the middle of the 20th century, the bells for which were provided by the centuries-old bell manufacturers of Aarau.

The town church was built between 1471 and 1478. During the Reformation, in 1528, its twelve altars and accompanying pictures were destroyed. The "Justice fountain" (Gerechtigkeitsbrunnen) was built in 1634, and is made of French limestone; it includes a statue of Lady Justice made of sandstone, hence the name. It was originally in the street in front of city hall, but was moved to its present location in front of the town church in 1905 due to increased traffic.

== Economy ==
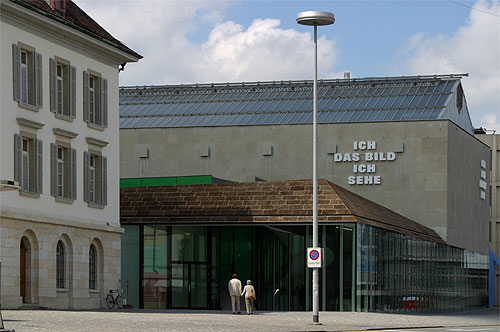
Kunsthaus Museum

As of 2007, Aarau had an unemployment rate of 2.35%. As of 2005, there were 48 people employed in the primary economic sector and about 9 businesses involved in this sector. 4,181 people are employed in the secondary sector and there are 164 businesses in this sector. 20,186 people are employed in the tertiary sector, with 1,461 businesses in this sector. This is a total of over 24,000 jobs, since Aarau's population is about 16,000 it draws workers from many surrounding communities. As of 2000 there were 8,050 total workers who lived in the municipality. Of these, 4,308 or about 53.5% of the residents worked outside Aarau while 17,419 people commuted into the municipality for work. There were a total of 21,161 jobs (of at least 6 hours per week) in the municipality.

The largest employer in Aarau is the cantonal government, the offices of which are distributed across the entire city at numerous locations. One of the two head offices of the Aargauer Zeitung, Switzerland's fifth largest newspaper, is located in Aarau, as are the Tele M1 television channel studios, and several radio stations.

Kern & Co., founded in 1819, was an internationally known geodetic instrument manufacturer based in Aarau. However, it was taken over by Wild Leitz in 1988, and was closed in 1991.

The small scale of Aarau causes it to continually expand the borders of its growth. The urban center lies in the middle of the "Golden Triangle" between Zurich, Bern, and Basel, and Aarau is having increasing difficulty in maintaining the independence of its economic base from the neighboring large cities. The idea of merging Aarau with its neighboring suburbs has been recently discussed in the hope of arresting the slowly progressing losses.

Manufacture include bells, mathematical instruments, electrical goods, cotton textiles, cutlery, chemicals, shoes, and other products. Aarau is famous for the quality of their instruments, cutlery and their bells.

=== Markets and fairs ===
Every Saturday morning there is a vegetable market in the Graben at the edge of the Old City. It is supplied with regional products. In the last week of September the MAG (Market of Aarauer Tradesmen) takes place there, with regional companies selling their products. The "Rüeblimärt" is held in the same place on the first Wednesday in November, which is a Carrot fair. The Aarau fair is held at the ice skating rink during the Spring.

== Transport ==
Aarau railway station is a terminus of the S-Bahn Zürich on the line S11, and a major railway interchange that results in it often featuring in annual statistics of Switzerland's most used stations.

The town is also served with public transport provided by Busbetrieb Aarau AG.

=== Routes ===
Number	Start point	End point
1	Küttigen	Buchs
2	Barmelweid	Rohr
3	Gretzenbach	Aarau
4	Biberstein	Suhr
5	Goldern	Aarau
6	Damm	Suhr
7	Zelgli	Aarau

== Population ==
The population of Aarau grew continuously from 1800 until about 1960, when the city reached a peak population of 17,045, more than five times its population in 1800. However, since 1960 the population has fallen by 8%. There are three reasons for this population loss: firstly, since the completion of Telli (a large apartment complex), the city has not had any more considerable land developments. Secondly, the number of people per household has fallen; thus, the existing dwellings do not hold as many people. Thirdly, population growth was absorbed by neighboring municipalities in the regional urban area, and numerous citizens of Aarau moved into the countryside. This trend might have stopped since the turn of the 21st century. Existing industrial developments are being used for new purposes instead of standing empty.

Aarau has a population (as of 31 December 2020) of 21,726. As of 2008, 19.8% of the population was made up of foreign nationals. Over the last 10 years the population has grown at a rate of 1%. Most of the population (as of 2000) speaks German (84.5%), with Italian being second most common (3.3%) and Serbo-Croatian being third (2.9%).

The age distribution, as of 2008, in Aarau is; 1,296 children or 8.1% of the population are between 0 and 9 years old and 1,334 teenagers or 8.4% are between 10 and 19. Of the adult population, 2,520 people or 15.8% of the population are between 20 and 29 years old. 2,518 people or 15.8% are between 30 and 39, 2,320 people or 14.6% are between 40 and 49, and 1,987 people or 12.5% are between 50 and 59. The senior population distribution is 1,588 people or 10.0% of the population are between 60 and 69 years old, 1,219 people or 7.7% are between 70 and 79, there are 942 people or 5.9% who are between 80 and 89, and there are 180 people or 1.1% who are 90 and older.

As of 2000, there were 1,365 homes with 1 or 2 persons in the household, 3845 homes with 3 or 4 persons in the household, and 2119 homes with 5 or more persons in the household. The average number of people per household was 1.99 individuals. In 2008 there were 1,594 single family homes (or 18.4% of the total) out of a total of 8,661 homes and apartments.

In Aarau about 74.2% of the population (between age 25–64) have completed either non-mandatory upper secondary education or additional higher education (either university or a Fachhochschule). Of the school age population (in the 2008/2009 school year), there are 861 students attending primary school, there are 280 students attending secondary school, there are 455 students attending tertiary or university level schooling, there are 35 students who are seeking a job after school in the municipality.

Population Growth
year	population	Swiss Nationals	% German Speaking	% French Speaking	% Italian Speaking	% Protestant	% Roman Catholic
1558	ca. 1,200
1764	1, 868
1798	2, 458
1850	4,657	4,299	0.0%	0.0%	0.0%	0.0%	0.0%
1880a	5,914	5,381	99.2%	0.7%	0.2%	81.9%	17.4%
1910	9,593	7,986	90.6%	2.2%	6.7%	71.7%	26.6%
1930	11,666	10,472	95.3%	1.7%	2.3%	72.7%	25.4%
1950	14,280	13,373	93.8%	2.2%	3.2%	70.4%	27.9%
1970	16,881	13,782	82.4%	1.6%	11.2%	60.1%	37.6%
1987	15,750					75%
1990	16,481	13,146	81.7%	1.0%	5.3%	49.7%	33.0%
1993	15,900
2010	19,497	15,695	85.0%	1.0%	3.3%	44.4%	28.8%
2016	21,036	16,534

== Sport ==
The football club FC Aarau play in the Stadion Brügglifeld. From 1981 until 2010 they played in the top tier of the Swiss football league system when they were relegated to the Swiss Challenge League. In the 2013/2014 they climbed back to the highest tier only to be relegated again. In the 2016/17 season they will play in the Swiss Challenge League. They won the Swiss Cup in 1985 and were three times Swiss football champions, in 1912, in 1914 and in 1993.

The Argovia Stars play in the MySports League, the third highest league of Swiss ice hockey. They play their home games in the 3,000-seat KeBa Aarau Arena.

BC Alte Kanti Aarau plays in the Swiss Women's Basketball Championship, the country's top division.

== Sites ==
=== Heritage sites of national significance ===
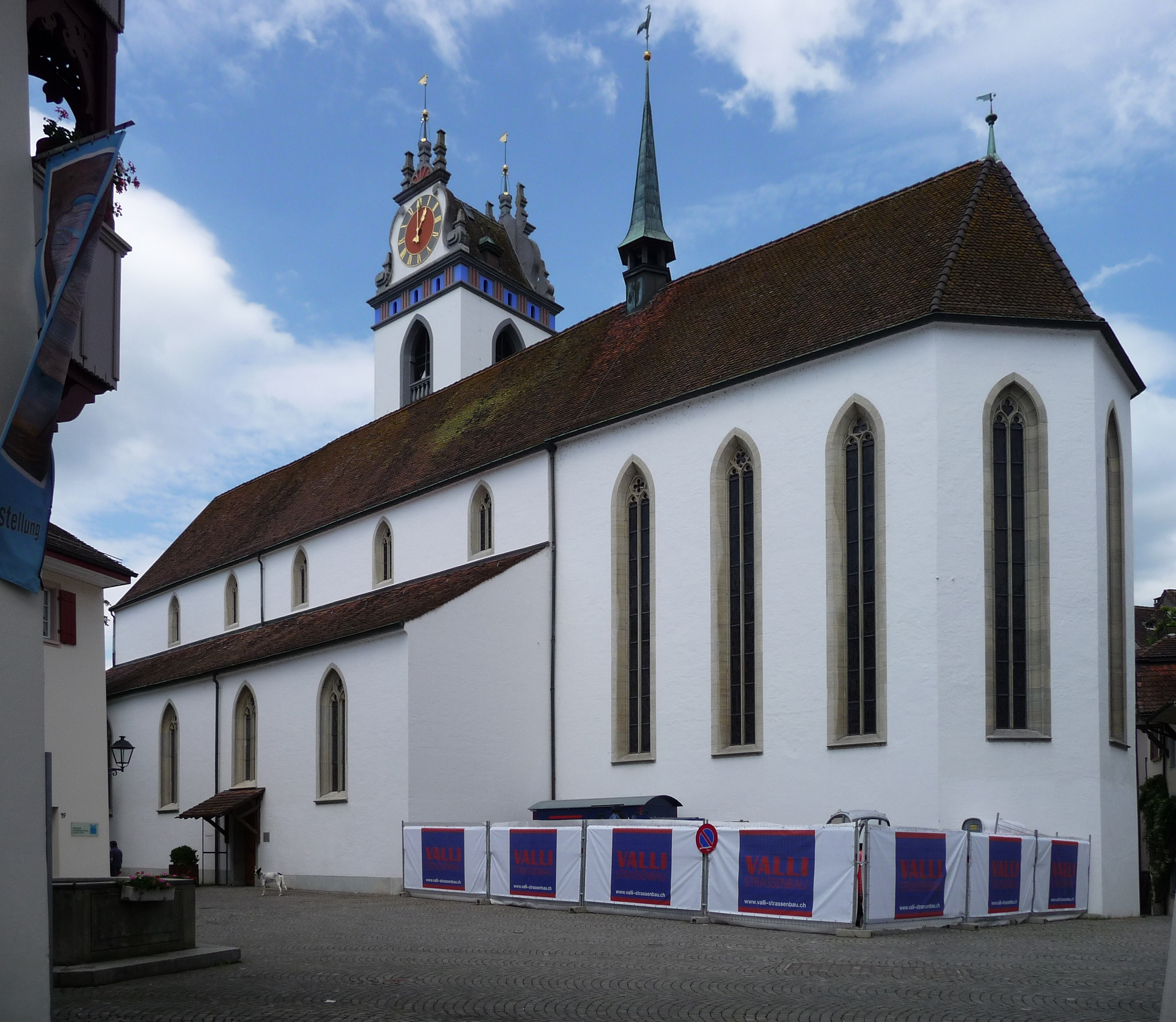
City Church

Aarau is home to a number of sites that are listed as Swiss heritage sites of national significance. The list includes three churches; the Christian Catholic parish house, the Roman Catholic parish house, and the Reformed City Church. There are five government buildings on the list; the Cantonal Library, which contains many pieces important to the nation's history, and Art Gallery, the old Cantonal School, the Legislature, the Cantonal Administration building, and the archives. Three gardens or parks are on the list; Garten Schmidlin, Naturama Aargau and the Schlossgarten. The remaining four buildings on the list are; the former Rickenbach Factory, the Crematorium, the Haus zum Erker at Rathausgasse 10 and the Restaurant Zunftstube at Pelzgasse.

=== Tourist sites ===
The Bally Shoe company has a unique shoe museum in the city. There is also the Trade Museum which contain stained glass windows from Muri Convent and paintings.

=== Annual events ===
Each May, Aarau plays host to the annual Jazzaar Festival attracting the world's top jazz musicians.

== Religion ==
From the 2000 census, 4'473 or 28.9% are Roman Catholic, while 6'738 or 43.6% belonged to the Swiss Reformed Church. Of the rest of the population, there are 51 individuals (or about 0.33% of the population) who belong to the Christian Catholic i.e. Old Catholic faith.

== Government ==
=== Legislative ===
In place of a town meeting, a town assembly (Einwohnerrat) of 50 members is elected by the citizens, and follows the policy of proportional representation. It is responsible for approving tax levels, preparing the annual account, and the business report. In addition, it can issue regulations. The term of office is four years. In the last two elections the parties had the following representation:

Party	2001	2018
FDP	13	11
SP	12	14
SVP	11	10
Die Mitte (Formerly Christian Democratic People's Party of Switzerland, CVP)	4	3
Pro Aarau	4	3
Green	2	5
EVP	3	2
GLP	0	2

At the district level, some elements of the government remain a direct democracy. There are optional and obligatory referendums, and the population retains the right to establish an initiative.

=== Executive ===
The executive authority is the town council (Stadtrat). The term of office is four years, and its members are elected by a plurality voting system. It leads and represents the municipality. It carries out the resolutions of the assembly, and those requested by the canton and national level governments.

The seven members (and their party) are:

- Hanspeter Hilfiker (FDP) (City President)
- Werner Schib (Die Mitte) (City Vice President)
- Angelica Cavegn Leitner (Pro Aarau)
- Franziska Graf (SP)
- Daniel Siegenthaler (SP)
- Hanspeter Thür (Grüne)
- Suzanne Marclay-Merz (FDP)

=== National elections ===
In the 2007 federal election the most popular party was the SP which received 27.9% of the vote. The next three most popular parties were the SVP (22.1%), the FDP (17.5%) and the Green Party (11.8%).

== Coat of arms ==
The blazon of the municipal coat of arms is Argent an Eagle displayed Sable beaked langued and membered Gules and a Chief of the last.

== Notable people ==
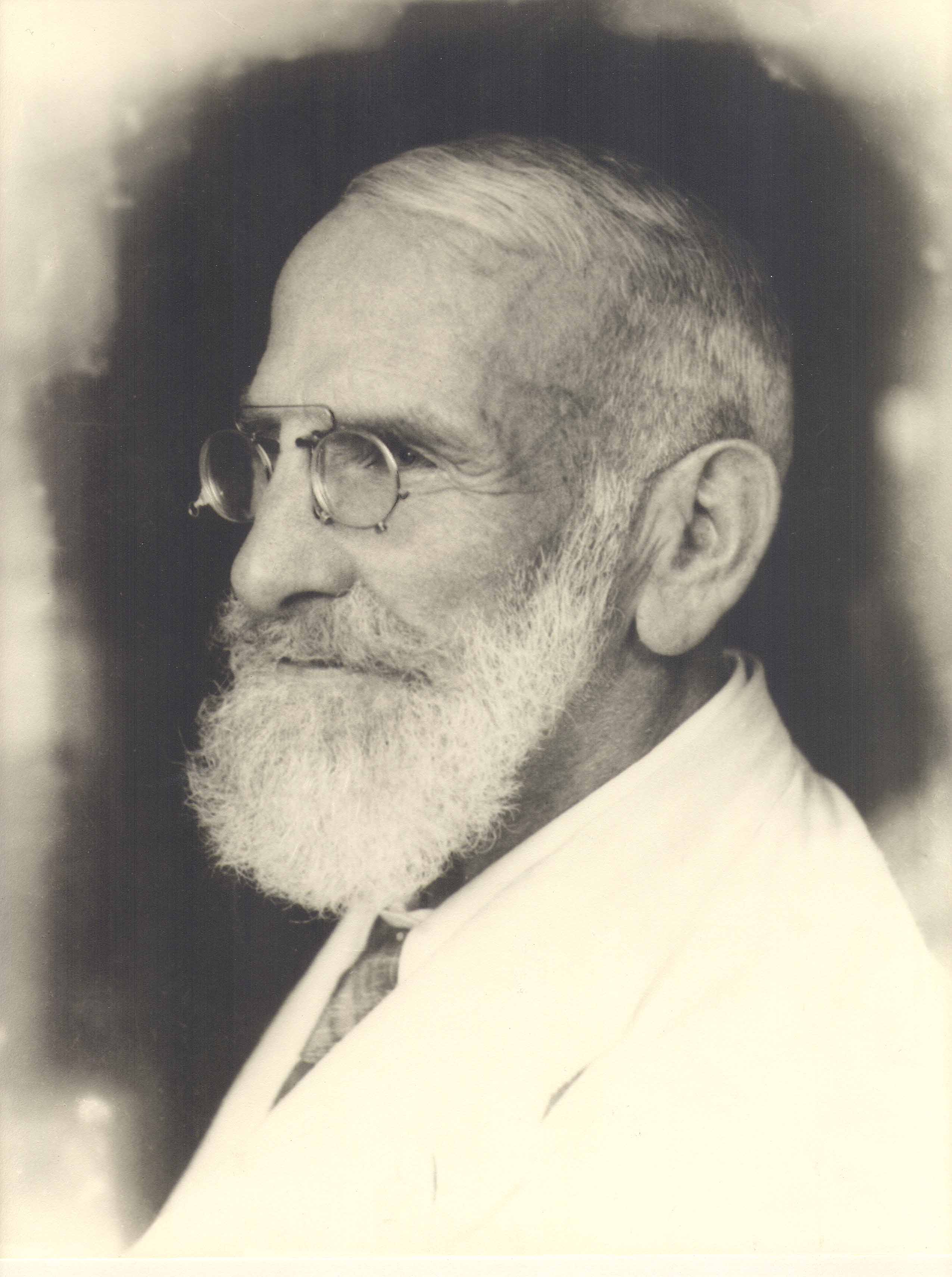
Maximilian Bircher-Benner

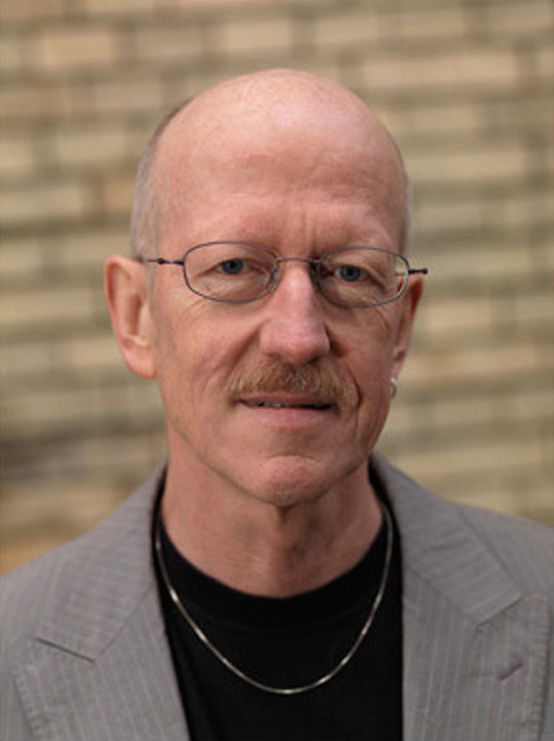
Martin Schlumpf, 2011

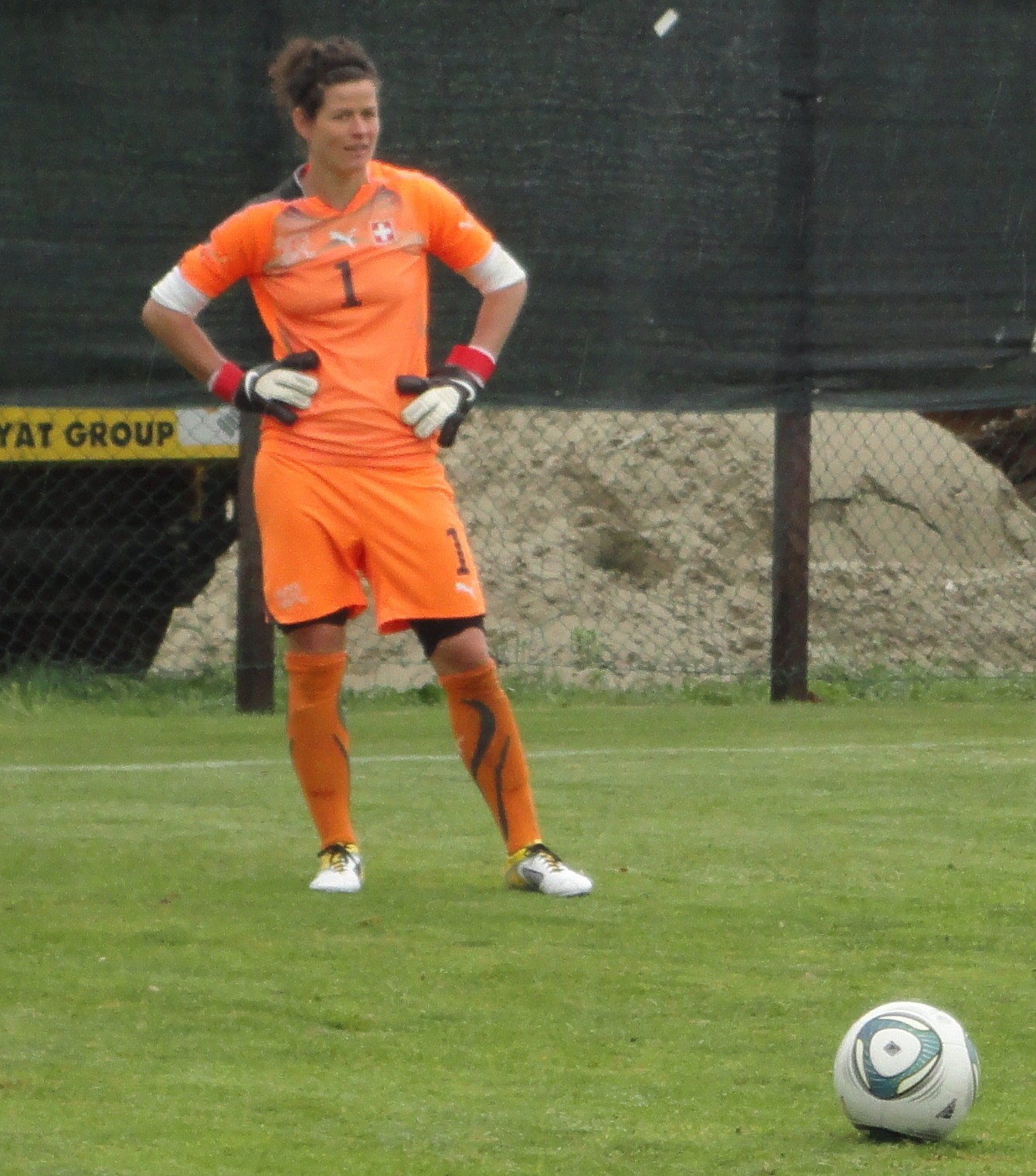
Marisa Brunner, 2013

=== Born in Aarau ===
- Ferdinand Rudolph Hassler (1770–1843), first director of the United States Coast Survey
- Hans Herzog (1819–1894), Swiss army General.
- Carl Feer-Herzog (1820–1880), politician, President of the Swiss National Council 1874
- Friedrich Mühlberg (1840–1915), a Swiss geologist
- Hans Renold (1852–1943), a Swiss/British engineer, inventor and industrialist in Britain
- Friedrich Zschokke (1860–1936), zoologist and parasitologist, grandson of Heinrich Zschokke
- Emil Hassler (1864–1937), physician, ethnographer, naturalist and botanist
- Maximilian Bircher-Benner (1867–1939), physician, pioneer nutritionist popularised muesli
- Frederick Sutermeister (1873–1934), a Swiss theologian and pastor
- Martha Burkhardt (1874–1956), painter and photographer
- Otto Hunziker (1879–1940), politician and author
- Eugen Bircher (1882–1956), politician
- Edmund Heuberger (1883–1962), art director, screenwriter and film director
- Karl Ballmer (1891–1958), painter, anthroposophical philosopher and writer
- Felix Hoffmann (1911–1975), graphic designer, illustrator and stained glass artist
- Erika Burkart (1922–2010), writer and poet
- Fritz Vogelsang (born 1932), decathlete, competed at the 1960 Summer Olympics
- Hansruedi Jost (1934–2016), hammer thrower, competed at the 1960 Summer Olympics
- Susanne Cook-Greuter, (born 1945), Swiss-american adult development researcher.
- Klaus Merz (born 1945), writer
- Martin Schlumpf (born 1947), musician, composer, conductor, improviser and academic teacher
- Urs Faes (born 1947), author
- Charlotte Walter (born 1951), figure skater, competed in the 1968 and 1972 Winter Olympics
- Jürg Frey (born 1953), composer and clarinettist
- Jörg Müller (born 1961), retired track cyclist and road bicycle racer, competed in the 1984 Summer Olympics
- Christian Reich (born 1967), bobsledder, competed in four Winter Olympics, winning silver
- Andreas Hilfiker (born 1969), former international footballer, 376 club caps
- Daniel Wermelinger (born 1971), football referee, president of the Swiss Referees Union
- Ivan Benito (born 1976), retired professional football goalkeeper, 327 club caps
- Marisa Brunner (born 1982), retired football goalkeeper, 75 caps for Switzerland women's national football team
- Stefan Eichenberger (born 1984), film director and film producer
- Ricardo Feller (born 2000), racing driver and ADAC GT Masters champion

=== Lived in Aarau ===
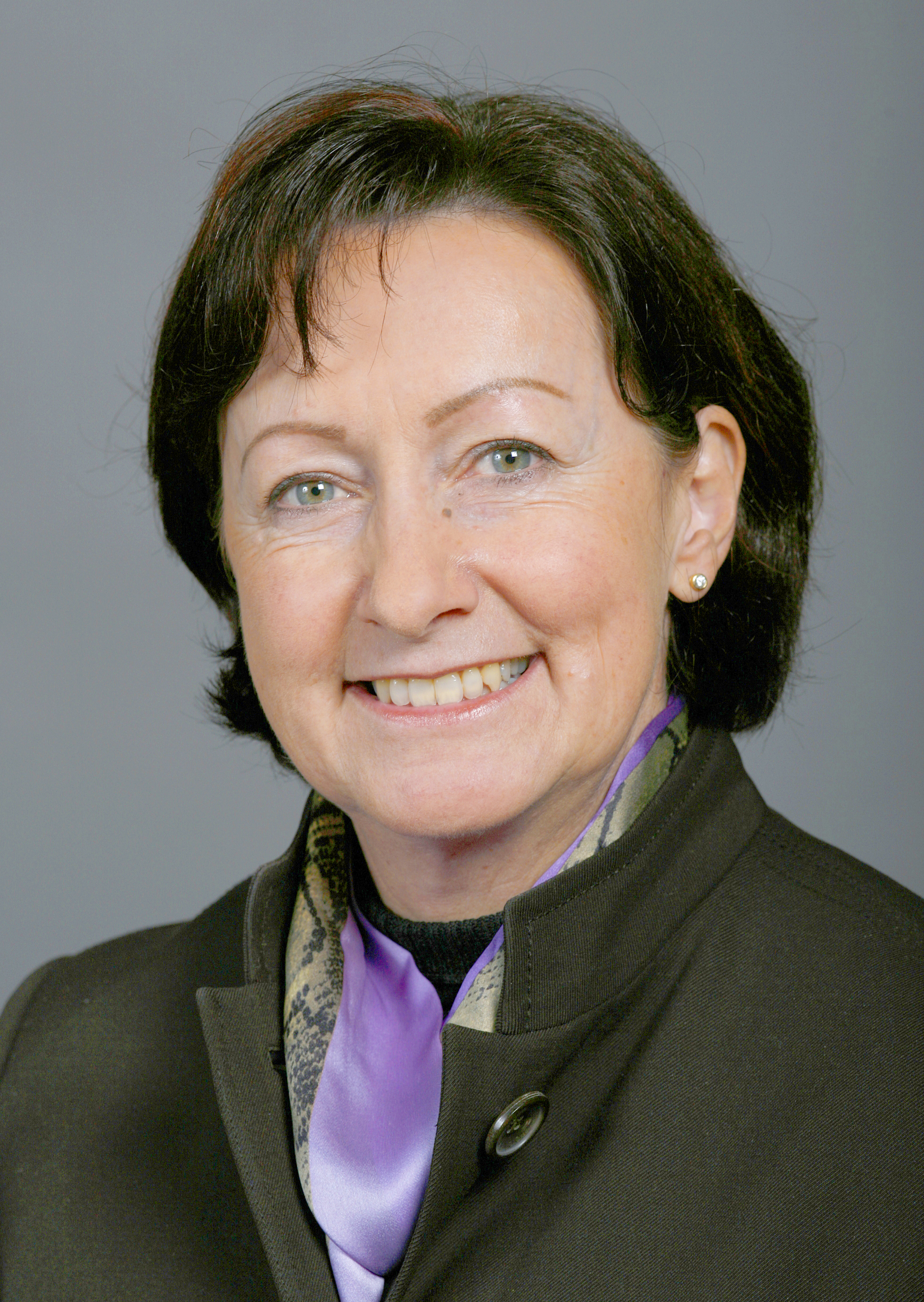
Sylvia Flückiger-Bäni

- Johann Rudolf Dolder (1753–1807), politician
- Johann Kaspar Riesbeck (1754–1786), author and actor
- Sebastian Fahrländer (1768–1841), politician, physician
- Heinrich Zschokke (1771–1848), German, later Swiss, author and reformer
- Ignaz Paul Vital Troxler (1780–1866), physician, politician, philosopher
- Johann Rudolph Rengger (1795–1832), naturalist and doctor
- Elisabeth Flühmann (1851–1929), teacher and women's rights activist
- Albert Einstein (1879–1955), scientist, professor, physicist, and technical assistant at the Swiss Patent Office
- Charles Tschopp (1899–1982), writer
- Bruno Hunziker (1930–2000), a Swiss attorney and politician
- Sylvia Flückiger-Bäni (born 1952), politician
- David Hönigsberg (1959–2005), a South African classical composer, conductor and musicologist
- Nicolas Müller (born 1982), a Swiss snowboarder
- Nivin Pauly (born 1984), an Indian actor
- Alexander Estis (born 1986), a Swiss author, translator and journalist

== International relations ==
=== Twin towns – sister cities ===
Aarau is twinned with:

Delft, Netherlands	Neuchâtel, Switzerland	Reutlingen, Germany

== See also ==
- Lenzburg (boasts a historical museum)
- History of the Canton of Aargau
