= Eugen Sutermeister =

Swiss writer (1862 - 1931)

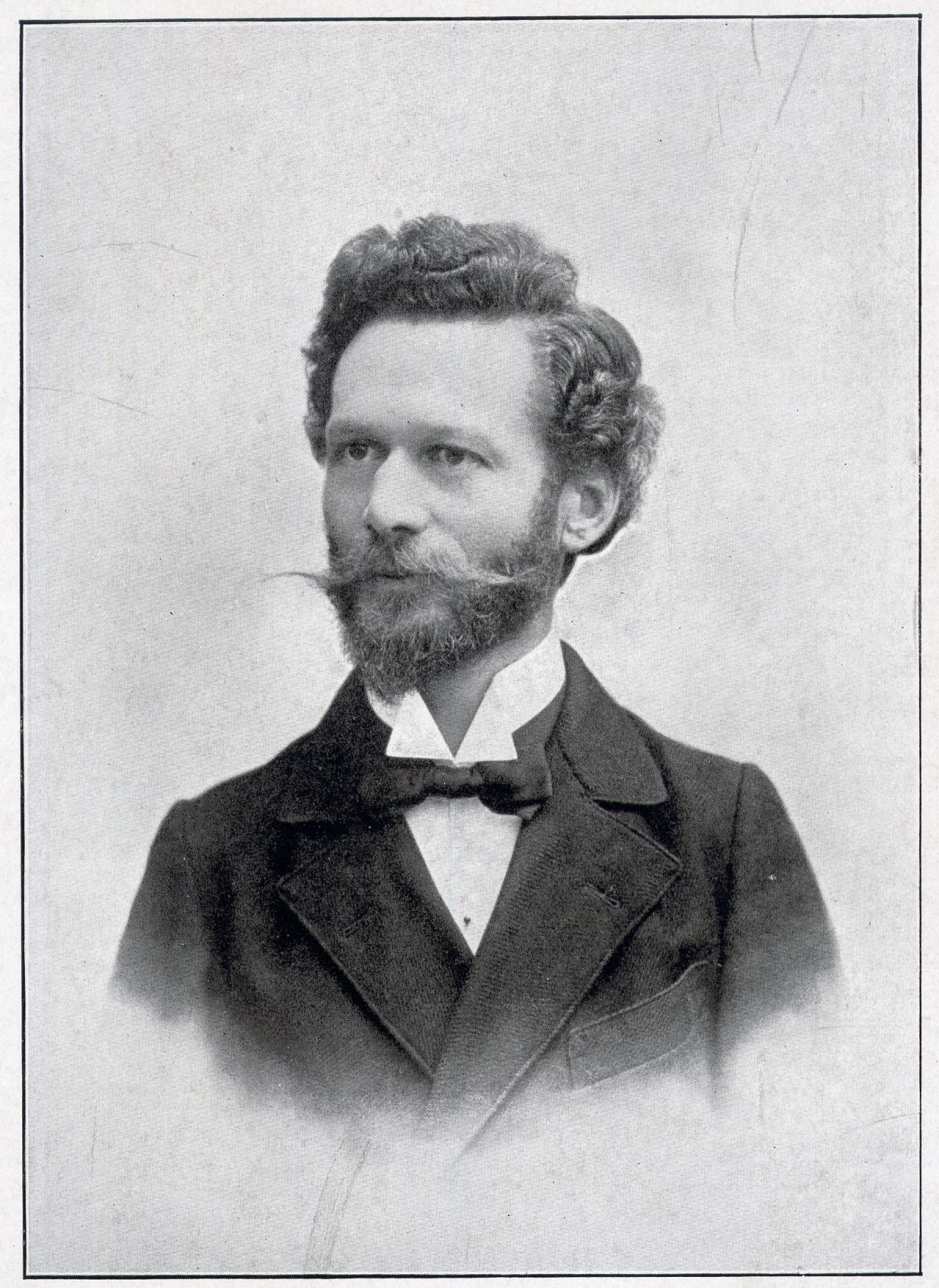
Eugen Sutermeister

Eugen Sutermeister (1862–1931) was a Swiss graveur and writer. In 1911, he founded the Sonos Society for people with hearing losses. Since 1912 he was member of the French Academy.
