= Heinrich Sutermeister =

Swiss composer (1910–1995)

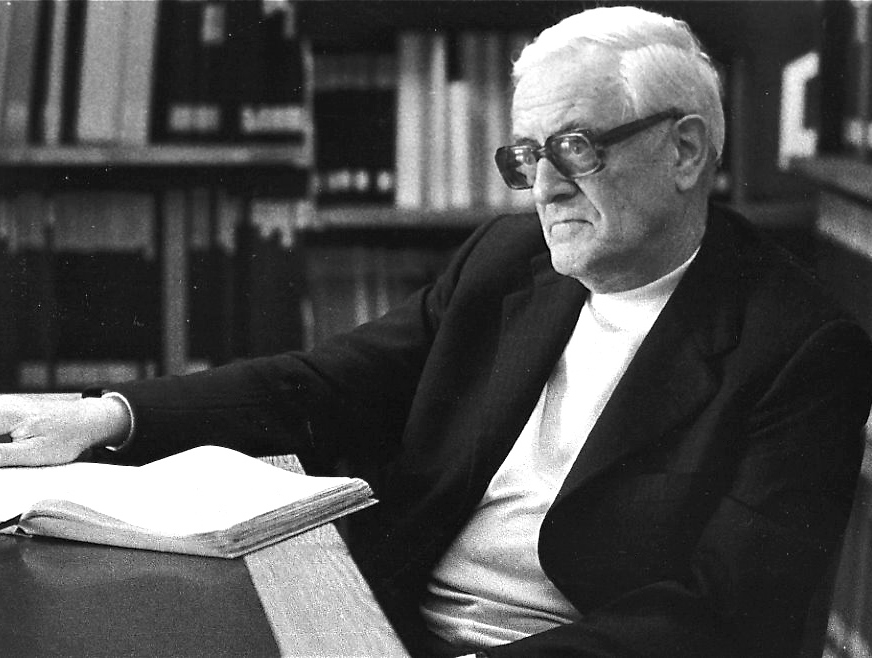
- Sutermeister in 1982
- Born: 12 August 1910; Feuerthalen, Switzerland
- Died: 16 March 1995 (aged 84); Vaux-sur-Morges, Switzerland
- Education: Akademie der Tonkunst
- Occupation: Classical composer
- Works: Stage and broadcast works

Heinrich Sutermeister (12 August 1910 – 16 March 1995) was a Swiss composer, most famous for his opera Romeo und Julia.

== Life and career ==
Sutermeister was born in Feuerthalen. During the early 1930s he was a student at the Akademie der Tonkunst in Munich, where Carl Orff was his teacher. Orff thereafter remained a powerful influence on his music. Returning to Switzerland in the mid-1930s, Sutermeister devoted his life to composition. He wrote some works for the radio, starting with Die schwarze Spinne in 1936, before turning later to television opera. His most successful stage work was Romeo und Julia, premiered in Dresden in 1940 under Karl Böhm.

Sutermeister's penultimate stage work, Madame Bovary, first given in Zurich in 1967, is loosely based on Flaubert's novel. With many characters cut, it consists largely of monologues for Emma Bovary, who was sung by Anneliese Rothenberger.

For his final opera, he adapted Ionesco's play Exit the King (Le Roi se meurt). According to musicologist Elizabeth Forbes, this opera, premiered in 1985 at Bavarian State Opera, with only six characters, a tiny chorus and a small orchestra is, in its modest way, as effective as anything Sutermeister wrote.

He was the brother of Hans Martin Sutermeister. Their grandfather was the folklorist Otto Sutermeister.

He died in Vaux-sur-Morges.

== Works ==
=== Concert, chamber and religious music ===
- Piano Concerto No. 1, 1943
- Capriccio for unaccompanied clarinet in A,1947
- Die Alpen, fantasy on Swiss folksongs, 1948
- Gavotte de Concert, for trumpet and piano, 1950
- Piano Concerto No. 2, 1953
- Missa da Requiem, 1952–1953
- Cello Concerto No. 1, 1954–55
- Piano Concerto No. 3, 1961–62
- Poème funèbre – En mémoire de Paul Hindemith for string orchestra, 1965
- Omnia ad Unum, cantata, 1965–66
- Cello Concerto No. 2, 1971
- Te Deum, 1975
- Clarinet Concerto, 1975–76
- Consolatio philosophiae, 'Scène dramatique', 1979
