= Otto Sutermeister =

Swiss folklorist and professor

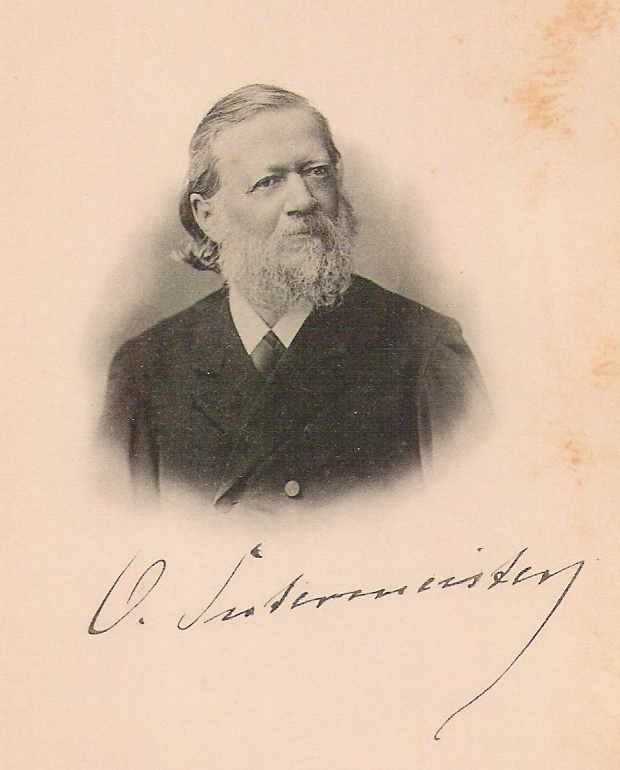
Otto Sutermeister

Friedrich Gottlieb Otto Sutermeister (27 September 1832 in Tegerfelden – 18 August 1901 in Aarau) was a Swiss folklorist and professor at the University of Berne who collected and revised numerous folk tales, legends, fables, and proverbs.

Strongly influenced by the Brothers Grimm, Sutermeister emphasized the didactic aspect of Swiss folklore and rewrote many of the tales to suit young readers. He also was editor of the works of Jeremias Gotthelf and of the "Swiss Idioticon".

Otto Sutermeister was a friend of the German poet Friedrich Rückert, the father of Werner Sutermeister and the grandfather of Heinrich and Hans Martin Sutermeister.

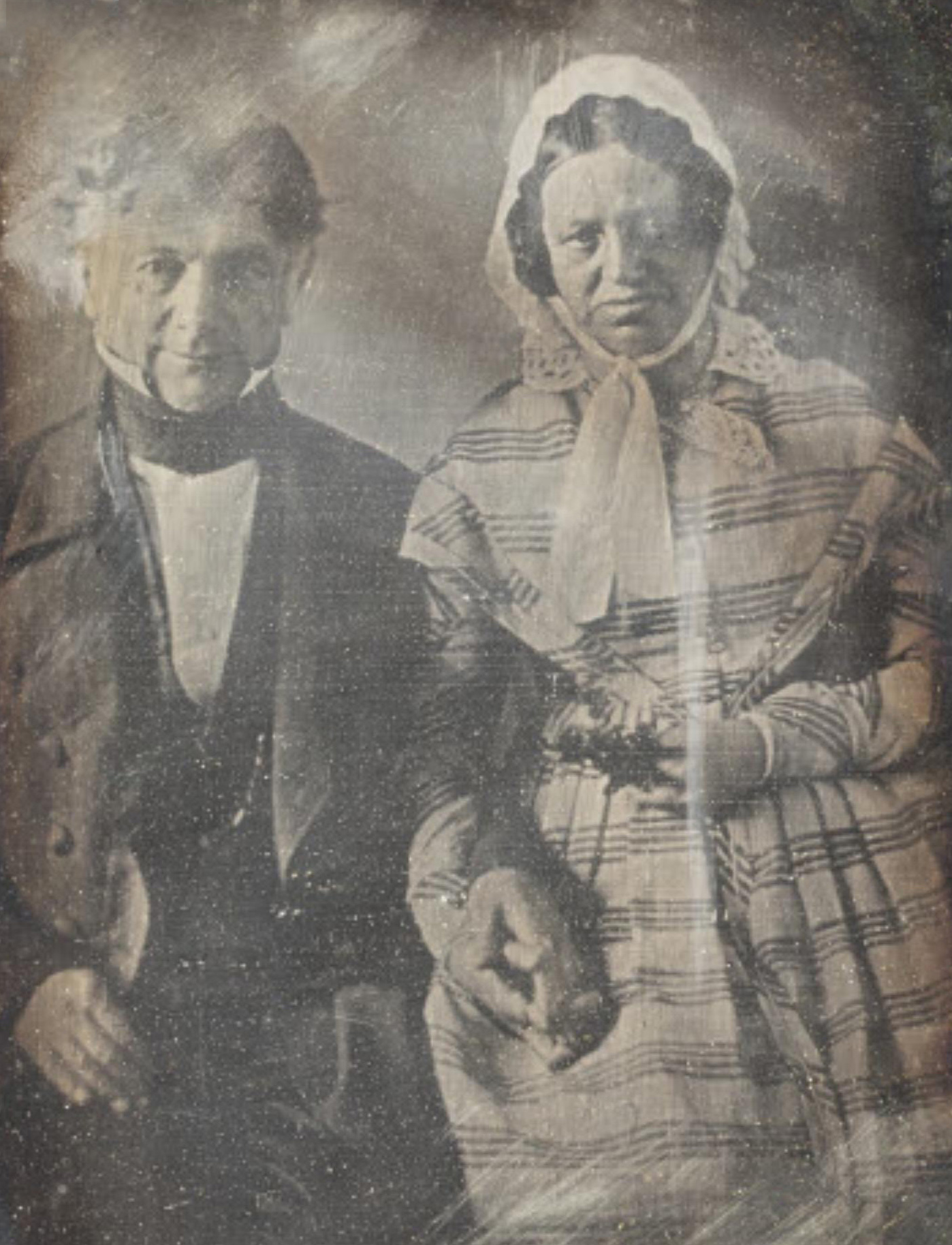
Heinrich Cornelius and Maria Salome Sutermeister, his parents

== Works ==
His major works are:

- "Frisch und Fromm: Erzählungen, Märchen, Fabeln, Schwänke für die Jugend" ("Fresh and Pious: Stories, Fairy Tales, Fables, and Anecdotes for the Young"), 1863;
- "Kinder‐ und Hausmärchen" ("Children's and Household Tales"), 1869;
- "Kornblumen: Fabeln und Märchen" ("Cornflowers: Fables and Fairy Tales"), 1870.
