= Hans Martin Sutermeister =

Swiss physician, writer, and politician

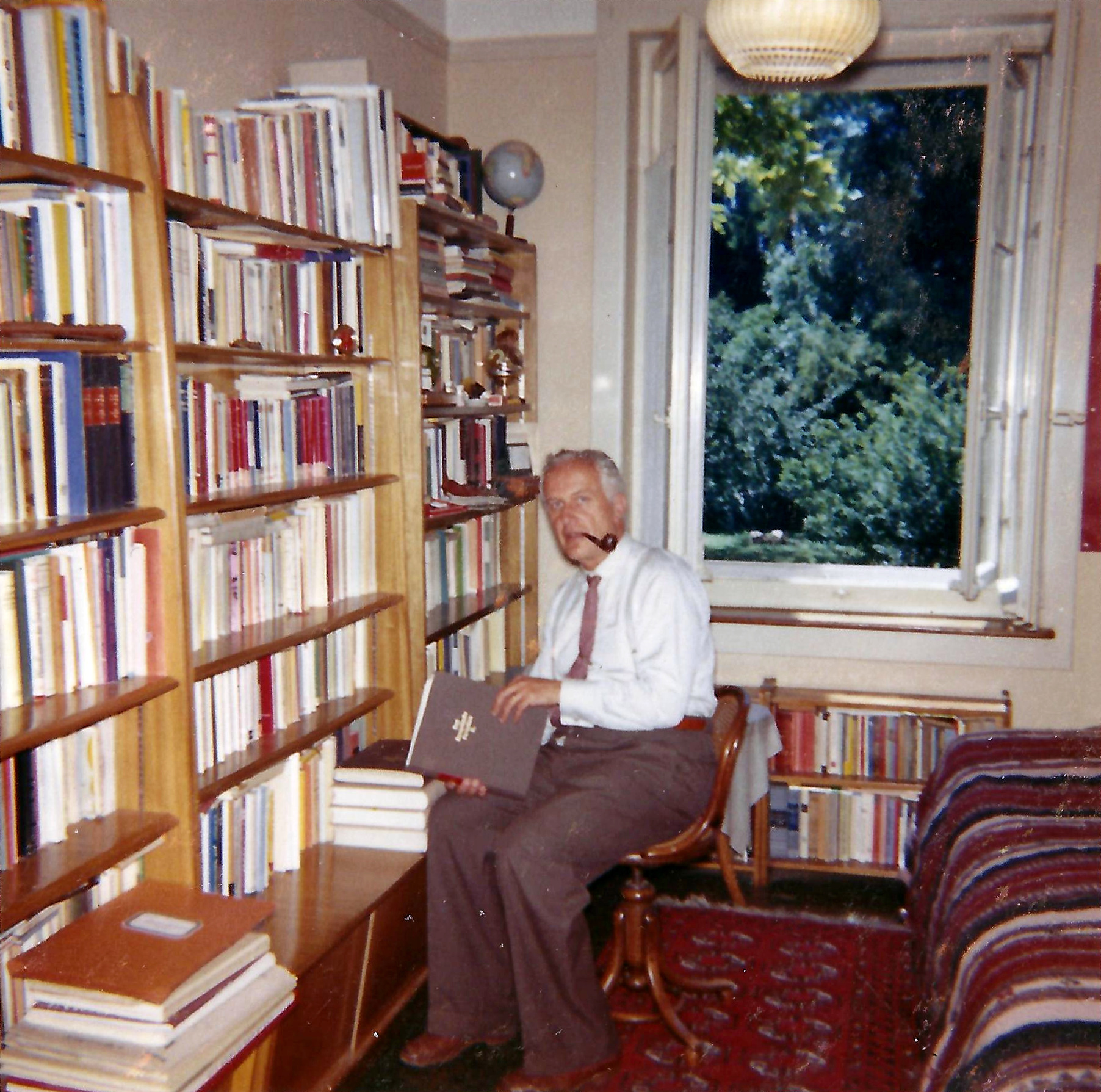
- Sutermeister in 1961
- Born: 29 September 1907; Schlossrued, Switzerland
- Died: 4 May 1977 (aged 69); Basel, Switzerland
- Citizenship: Swiss
- Education: University of Basel
- Known for: activism against miscarriages of justice

Hans Martin Sutermeister (29 September 1907 – 4 May 1977 pen name: Hans Moehrlen) was a Swiss physician and medical writer, politician, and activist against miscarriages of justice.

== Life ==
=== Early years ===
Hans Martin was born to Friedrich Sutermeister (1873-1934) and Maria Hunziker (1875-1947). His brothers include the writer Peter and composer Heinrich. His grandfather was the folklorist Otto Sutermeister. A minister's son, Hans Martin studied theology in Germany, changing to medicine at University of Basel just before completing his degree. After his promotion with his uncle Hans Hunziker in 1941, Sutermeister published, under the pseudonym “Hans Moehrlen” (following the surname of his great-grandfather Christophe Moehrlen), an autobiographical novella about his life as a bachelor. The novella describes his philosophical change of direction towards a monist view of love and happiness, inspired by natural science; remarkably is its heartedness in times of war. In the following years, Sutermeister published a series on neopositivist medical thought. He was especially interested in psychosomatic medicine and music psychology. For example, according to him, “swing music is restful” because

the brain becomes fatigued when it is worked too hard, as in acquiring knowledge of new facts. Both students and business men can benefit by such music … the best way to rest the brain after such fatigue is to “regress” to more basic or primitive forms of thought and feeling.

During World War II, he worked for the United Nations Relief and Rehabilitation Administration in Germany, Poland and Czechoslovakia, as well as a physician at the Swiss border. After the war he wrote for medical journals and was an instructor in psychophysiology at the Volkshochschule (Folk high school) in Bern. In 1945, he opened his first a family medical practice in Bern.

In order to get a venia legendi in History of Medicine and Medical Psychology (Psychosomatics), Sutermeister successively deposited, at the beginning of the 1950s, three post-doctoral theses at the Medical Faculty of the University of Berne:

- About the changes in the perception of the disease;
- Psychosomatics of laughter and crying (a philosophical-psychological and physiological work on the Freud's theory of humor);
- Schiller as physician: a contribution to psychosomatic medicine.

Sutermeister was in contact with the medical historian Erich Hintzsche particularly because of his work Schiller as physician, and he participated in a seminar on medical history 1953 in Lugano. In a letter to Hintzsche, Henry E. Sigerist described Sutermeister's review, published in 1955 as Volume 13 of the Berne contributions to the history of medicine and natural sciences, as “a very nice work … that is interesting even to literary historians.” The assessor Jakob Klaesi recommended to the Dean of the Faculty Bernhard Walthard to allow Sutermeister's habilitation allow for the government to issue Sutermeister's habilitation as a lecturer in Medicine history and Psychosomatic medicine. Hintzsche, however, who decided jointly, rejected his habilitation.

=== Politics ===
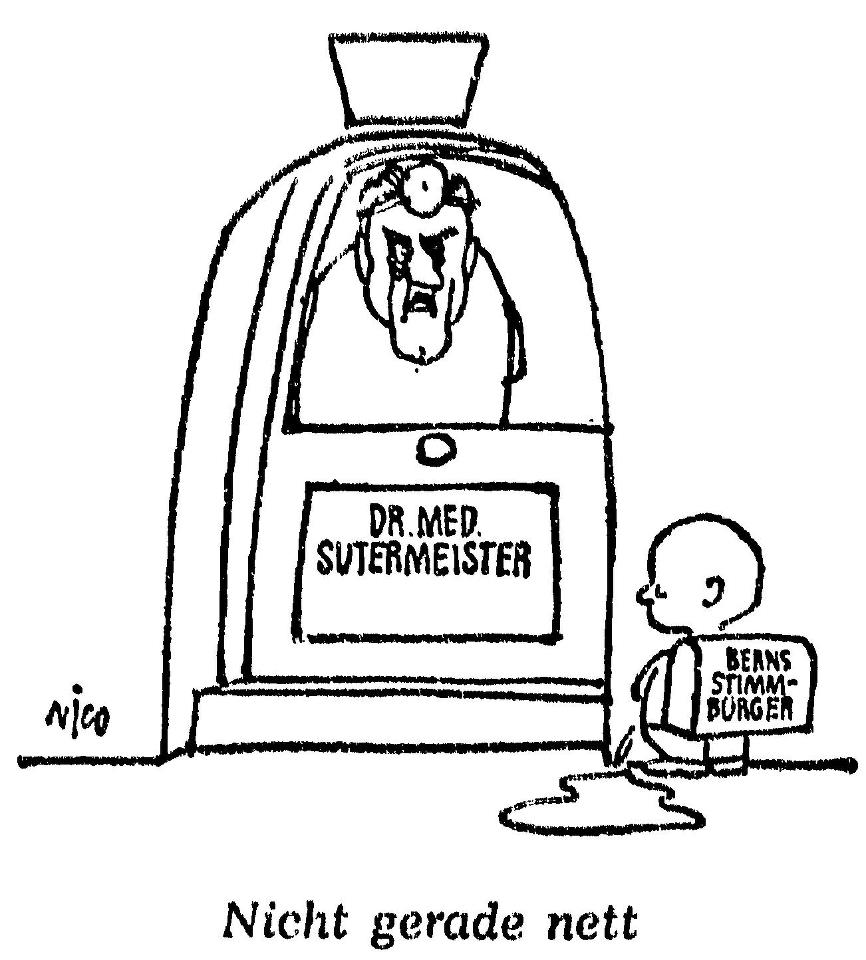
Cartoon by Nico on Sutermeister's deselection as Bernese city counciller after the schoolbook affair, 1971

He joined the Ring of Independents political party and began his political career in the legislature of the Canton of Bern. From 1967 to 1971 he served as a member of the municipal executive, as well as director of the city's schools. As school director, he promoted comprehensive schools. Although he had a reputation as a progressive within his party, he also stirred some concern both inside and outside the party by fiercely criticizing The Little Red Schoolbook, an educational manifesto deriving from the 1968 student protest movement that urged students to reject societal norms. Der Spiegel quoted his warning to all educators:

We will not permit our youth, who are today still healthy, and our freedom-based Western culture, to be undermined by such softening-up tactics, which are clearly controlled from the East, and made 'Ready for conquest' by Communism.

and added that some schools banned the book; Radio Bern canceled a broadcast on it; and bookstores canceled orders; the city authorities determined that the book was not seditious, but with police assurance that they had the power to do so, banned it as posing a danger to minors. His actions revealed latent attitudinal and generational divisions within the party, and he was not re-elected in 1971.

In 1972, he opened his new family medical practice in Basel.

=== Activism against miscarriages of justice ===
Of the Swiss Posters Collection: Sutermeister's election poster for the Bernese Gemeinderat, 1971.

In the 1960s, Sutermeister became interested in forensic pathology, and began to involve himself in investigating and attempting to right miscarriages of justice. He traveled widely and wrote analyses on false recognition, intimidation by prison inmates, uncritical acceptance of expert testimony, suggestibility and emotionalism in jurors and psychological errors by judges. His book Summa Iniuria, which treats hundreds of cases, is one of the most thorough German-language works in the field. He concerned himself particularly with the case of Pierre Jaccoud, whom he was convinced had been wrongly convicted of murdering Charles Zumbach based on faulty forensic work. At one point Pierre Hegg, the head of the police criminological laboratory, sued him for defamation. His efforts on behalf of Jaccoud made him a prominent and effective opponent of courtroom injustice, and he went so far as to assemble the funds to hire Horace Mastronardi and other lawyers to appeal Jaccoud's conviction. Despite his efforts, the case was never reopened.

The criminal law expert Karl Peters puts Sutermeister's Summa iniuria in the context of the earlier works of Erich Sello, Max Alsberg, Albert Hellwig, Max Hirschberg and Heinrich Jagusch and considers him as a "committed fighters for a constitutionally protected Criminal Justice".

== Bibliography ==
The bibliography of Hans Martin Sutermeister includes a fictional novel and around 150 scientific articles, essays and books, some of them Investigative journalism written by the Swiss writer Hans Martin Sutermeister, pen name Hans Moehrlen (1907–1977). Sutermeister was a prolific writer on topics related to psychosomatic medicine, music psychology and history of medicine as well as contemporary Swiss society and cultural criticism, whom Karl Peters in 2008 declared "a fierce fighter for justice."

Sutermeister is best remembered for his contradictory political as a both-left-and-rightwing libertarian-authoritarian presence in local media. Every line of work that he has written since 1942 seeming, directly or indirectly, in favour of a monist worldview. To that end, Sutermeister used his scientific writing to defend his political convictions, as shown in several book reviews. He first achieved acclaim with his non–fictional books from Psychologie und Weltanschauung (1944) to Schiller als Arzt (1955) and cemented his place in local history as one of the greatest Swiss pamphletists with the publication of Summa Iniuria: Ein Pitaval der Justizirrtümer shortly before his death.

Sutermeister wrote non-fiction—including book reviews, editorials, and investigative journalism—for a variety of Swiss periodicals, mainly medical journals. He particularly wrote a book-length investigation of comprehensive schools in Switzerland and another of miscarriages of justice in the form of Summa Iniuria: Ein Pitaval der Justizirrtümer, a retrospective of criminal justice mainly in Switzerland and Germany.

No attempts have been made until now to comprehensively collect the entirety of his miscellany.

=== Books ===
Sutermeister composed one novel, Zwischen zwei Welten, which is autobiographical; it was inspired by his period working as a student during wartime; it records his experiences living and tramping in a town where he later finished his medical studies; the names are partially fictionalized:

- Moehrlen, Hans (pen name of Hans Martin Sutermeister) (1942). Zwischen zwei Welten: Novelle. Bern: Buchdruckerei Mettler & Salz A.G. (Autobiographic novel, published under the pseudonym "Hans Moehrlen"). 76 pages. Reprint by the Swiss National Library, Bern 2011, ISBN 978-3-226-00030-6.

Book reviews:
- Carl Heinrich in: Die Gefährten: Monatsschrift für Erkenntnis und Tat. Vol. 9–17, 1947, p. 69.
- Anton Schaller: Zwischen zwei Welten: Erinnerung an den Landesring oder was eine kleine Novelle bewirken kann Seniorweb.ch, 29 April 2012.

Among his Non-fiction books are the writings of his Neopositivist period (1942–1945) which culminates in his article Der Neopositivismus als neue Einheitsweltanschauung (1945; see below):

- Nomen atque omen. Die Fortschritte der psychologischen Forschung und ihre weltanschauliche Tragweite (mit besonderer Berücksichtigung des Neuroseproblems). Buchdruckerei W. Friedli, Bern 1942, 92 pages.
- Sutermeister, Hans Martin (1944). Psychologie und Weltanschauung: Wirklichkeitsfragen und ihre Beantwortung nach dem heutigen Stande der Wissenschaft in allgemeinverständlicher Darstellung. Bern: Hans Huber. ASIN B000SFI7NY. OCLC 602245072. 184 pages. (Hans Huber: today Hogrefe.) Book reviews of:

- Hans Rudolf Oehlhey: Review of "Psychologie und Weltanschauung". In: "Aufbau: Kulturpolitische Monatsschrift." Berlin W 8. vol. 3, 1947, nr. 3, p. 282-283.
- Agostino Gemelli in: „Scientia“: rivista di scienza, Vol. 83, 1948, p. 119–120; and in: Archivio di psicologia, neurologia e psichiatria, 7, 1946, p. 227.
- ? in: Zeitschrift für pädagogische Psychologie und Jugendkunde, Vol. 45, 1944, p. 63.
- ? in: Universitas, Vol. 6, 1951, p. 383 (with a short biographic note).

- Sutermeister, Hans Martin (1944). Von Tanz, Musik und anderen schönen Dingen: Psychologische Plaudereien. Bern: Hans Huber. OCLC 601437512. 140 pages.
- Der Alltag des Arztes. In: Ulrich Frey, Hans Martin Sutermeister, Werner Messerli (1910–1991): Der Arzt. Paul Haupt Verlag, Bern 1956, p. 20–31 (Gemeinnütziger Verein der Stadt Bern (Herausgeber): Die akademischen Berufe. Eine Schriftenreihe zur Erleichterung der Berufswahl. Vol. 3).
- * Sutermeister, Hans Martin (May 1971). Möglichkeiten einer inneren und äusseren Schulreform im Sinne der Gesamtschule in der Stadt Bern: Prolegomena zu einer Projektstudie "Integrierte Gesamtschule Brünnen" entsprechend der Motion Theiler. Bern. OCLC 600875622. Published by the Schuldirektion der Stadt Bern; 225 pages.

The work is an exact reproduction with some extensions of the initial report Möglichkeiten und Grenzen einer stadtbernischen Bildungspolitik mit dem Ziel einer inneren und äusseren Schulreform („Gesamtschule“) published in January 1971.

- Sutermeister, Hans Martin (1976). Summa Iniuria: Ein Pitaval der Justizirrtümer: fünfhundert Fälle menschlichen Versagens im Bereich der Rechtsprechung in kriminal- und sozialpsychologischer Sicht. Basel: Elfenau. ISBN 978-3-226-00096-2. (810 pages). Reprint: Swiss National Library, Bern 2011, ISBN 978-3-226-00096-2. Book reviews:

- Karl Peters in: Zeitschrift für die gesamte Strafrechtswissenschaft. Vol. 26, “Band” 88, nr. 1, 1976, p. 993-995, doi:10.1515/zstw.1976.88.4.978;
- Klaus Volk in: Monatsschrift für Kriminologie und Strafrechtsreform. Vol. 60, 1977, p. 388;
- Wolfgang Lorenz in: Archiv für Kriminologie. Vol. 160, nr. 3/4, 1977;
- Otto Scrinzi in: Ärztliche Praxis: Die Zeitung des Arztes in Klinik und Praxis. 1976/1977.

- Sutermeister, Hans Martin (1976). Grundbegriffe der Psychologie von heute. Basel: Elfenau. ISBN 978-3-226-00313-0. (523 pages). Reprint: Swiss National Library, Bern 2011, ISBN 978-3-226-00313-0. Book reviews:

- Rémy Droz in: Psychologie: Schweizerische Zeitschrift für Psychologie und ihre Anwendungen, 35-36, 1976, p. 317;
- ? in: Psychotherapie und medizinische Psychologie, Vol. 28, 1978, p. 180;
- Otto Scrinzi in: Ärztliche Praxis: Die Zeitung des Arztes in Klinik und Praxis. Vol. 29, nr. 13, 12 February 1977;
- ? in: Psychiatrie, Neurologie und medizinische Psychologie, Volume 32, 1980, p. 122.

=== Academic work ===
Doctoral dissertation:

- Das schweizerische Tuberkulosegesetz. Geschichte, Inhalt, Ausführung und Erfolg bis zur Gegenwart. Dissertation, Faculty of Medicine of the University of Basel. Benno Schwabe & Co., Basel 1941.

At the University of Berne, Sutermeister presented subsequently three Habilitation theses, which were all rejected:

- Sutermeister, Hans Martin (1947). "Über die Wandlungen in der Auffassung des Krankheitsgeschehens". Gesundheit und Wohlfahrt. 27 (12): 417–460.
- Sutermeister, Hans Martin (1952). "Psychosomatik des Lachens und Weinens". Gesundheit und Wohlfahrt. 32 (6): 337–371. PMID 12989438.
- Sutermeister, Hans Martin (1955). "Schiller als Arzt: ein Beitrag zur Geschichte der psychosomatischen Forschung". Berner Beiträge zur Geschichte der Medizin und der Naturwissenschaften (13). Bern: Paul Haupt. ASIN B000JVFCBW.

=== Articles ===
Sutermeister wrote dozens of essays and book reviews. His insights into history of medicine, literature, and politics (defending in particular anti-fascist, liberal socialist, freethought and somehow anti-communist ideas) during the following years. Since his death, many essays have disappeared, with the first attempt at a comprehensive collection being this list. Some of his essays, mainly during his time as member of the Ring of Independents political party, took the form of pamphlets and were published and distributed (by himself) independently.

The following list contains the articles which are both registered in PubMed and can be considered as outstanding because of their scope, theme range or length:

- Verstehende oder erklärende Psychologie? Buchdruckerei W. Friedli, Bern 1942 (12 pages).
- Alte und neue Logik. Neuere Ergebnisse der psychologischen Forschung und ihre Tragweite (mit besonderer Berücksichtigung des Neuroseproblems). Buchdruckerei W. Friedli, Bern 1942 (19 pages).
- Neue Gesichtspunkte der medizinischen Psychologie. In: Praxis: Schweizerische Rundschau für Medizin. nr. 45, 9 November 1944 (16 pages).
- Neue Gesichtspunkte in der Psychologie. In: Schweizerische Zeitschrift für Psychologie und ihre Anwendungen. Vol. 2, nr. 4, 1944, p. 307–312.
- ‘Wünsche an die Welt von morgen’: Gedanken zu einer Umfrage . In: Schweizerische Hochschulzeitung. Vol. 19, nr. 1, 1945/46 (2 pages).
- Zum gegenwärtigen Stand der Kropfforschung. In: Ars Medici: Organ des praktischen Arztes. Vol. 35, nr. 12, 1945, p. 666–673, PMID 21021268.
- With Étienne Grandjean: Föhn und Föhnkrankheit. In: Ars medici: Organ des praktischen Arztes. Vol. 35, 1945, nr. ?, p. 494.
- Krankheit, Wetter und Klima. In: Die Gesundheit: Korrespondenzblatt der Krankenkasse für den Kanton Bern. 1945, p. 2–3.
- Zur Kontroverse ‘Abstrakt-Konkret’. In: Abstrakt, konkret: Bulletin der Galerie des Eaux Vives. Vol. 11, 1945 (2 pages).
- Der Neopositivismus als kommende ‘Einheitsweltanschauung’? In: Der Freidenker: Organ der Freigeistigen Vereinigung der Schweiz. Vol. 28, 1945, nr.8 and 9.
- Zur Geschichte des Psychogeniebegriffs. In: Gesundheit und Wohlfahrt. vol. 7, 1945, p. 377–410.
- Zum heutigen Stand des Erkältungsproblems. In: Praxis: Schweizerische Rundschau für Medizin. Vol. 34, nr. 52, 27 December 1945, p. 746–753, PMID 21021575.
- Die Dermatologie in der Allgemeinpraxis. In: Praxis: Schweizerische Rundschau für Medizin. Vol. 35, nr. 11, 15 March 1946 (22 pages).
- Erfahrungen aus der Lagermedizin. In: Praxis: Schweizerische Rundschau für Medizin. Vol. 37, nr. 3, 22 January 1948, p. 44–51, PMID 18862801.
- Über Speranskys ‘Neuralpathologie’ und ‘Neuraltherapie’. In: Praxis: Schweizerische Rundschau für Medizin. Vol. 37, nr. 36, 9 September 1948, p. 670–673, PMID 18883564.
- Zum Thema Mode und Medizin. In: Praxis: Schweizerische Rundschau für Medizin. Vol. 37, nr. 46, 18 November 1948, p. 860–862, PMID 18100731.
- Über Speranskys Krankheitslehre. Speranskys Neuralpathologie und Neuraltherapie. In: Ars Medici. Vol. 38, nr. 9, 1948, p. 554–562, PMID 18886628.
- Über Speranskys Krankheitslehre. In: Schweizerische medizinische Wochenschrift. Vol. 79, nr. 15, 16 April 1949, p. 345-348, PMID 18129129.
- Über Rhythmusforschung in der Medizin. In: Praxis: Schweizerische Rundschau für Medizin. Vol. 38, nr. 35, 1 September 1949, p. 743–750, PMID 18140851.
- Nachwort zum Aufsatz über Speranskys Krankheitslehre. In: Medizinische Monatsschrift. Vol. 3, nr. 11, November 1949, p. 824, PMID 15410397.
- Über Farben- und Musiktherapie. In: Gesundheit / Gesundheit und Wohlfahrt. Vol. 30, nr. 1, January 1950, p. 1, PMID 15404703.
- Neue Gesichtspunkte in Medizin und Psychohygiene. In: Praxis: Schweizerische Rundschau für Medizin. Vol. 39, nr. 14, 6 April 1950, p. 297–302, PMID 15412891.
- Film und Psychohygiene. In: Gesundheit und Wohlfahrt. Vol. 30, nr. 6, June 1950, p. 249–278, PMID 15435807. Book review:

- 306. Sutermeister, H. Film und Psychohygiene. Movies and mental hygiene. In: Educational aspects and practical measures. In: The influence of the cinema on children and adolescents: An annotated international bibliography. Reports and Papers on Mass Communication, Nr. 31. Paris: UNESCO, 1961, p. 70.

- Über psychosomatische Medizin. In: Wiener Medizinische Wochenschrift. Vol. 100, nr. 29–30, 12 August 1950, p. 493–496, PMID 14777055.
- Über den heutigen Stand der Sexualforschung. In: Praxis: Schweizerische Rundschau für Medizin. Vol. 39, nr. 37, 14 September 1950, p. 794–800, PMID 14780971.
- Zur Psychologie des Kurpfuschers. In: Praxis: Schweizerische Rundschau für Medizin. Vol. 39, nr. 52, 28 December 1950, p. 1115–1122, PMID 14816246.

Reviev: Theodor Oettli: ‘’The quack problem; comments on points made by H. Sutermeister.’’ [Zum Kurpfuscherproblem; Gedanken zu den Ausfürhrungen von H. Sutermeister.] In: Praxis

Volume 40, Issue 6, 8 February 1951, Pages 121-122. ISSN 0369-8394 PMID 14827825

- Medizin und Presse. In: Der Bund, 1950.
- Musiktherapie. In: Universitas: Zeitschrift für Wissenschaft, Kunst und Literatur. Vol. 6, nr. 3, 1951, p. 307–318.
- Der heutige Stand der ‚psychosomatischen Medizin‘. In: Praxis: Schweizerische Rundschau für Medizin. Vol. 40, nr. 38, 20 September 1951, p. 777–785, PMID 14891595.
- Masse und Musik. In: Schweizerische Monatsschrift ‚Du‘. March 1952 (4 pages).
- Psychosomatik des Schmerzes (Der heutige Stand des Schmerzproblems). In: Praxis: Schweizerische Rundschau für Medizin. Vol. 41, nr. 32, 7 August 1952, p. 681–692, PMID 13003877.
- Schiller als Arzt, sein Beitrag zur psychosomatischen Medizin. In: Praxis: Schweizerische Rundschau für Medizin, Vol. 42, nr. 33, 13 August 1953, pp. 685–689, PMID 13100228.
- Mit Werner Bärtschi-Rochaix: Zur Pathopsychologie des Lachens. In: Schweizer Archiv für Neurologie und Psychiatrie. Vol. 74, nr. 1–2, 1954, p. 416–419, PMID 14385748.
- Über die Fortschritte der ‘psychosomatischen’ Forschung. In: Praxis: Schweizerische Rundschau für Medizin. Vol. 43, nr. 13, 1 April 1954, p. 269–279, PMID 13177317.
- Zum heutigen Stand der Aphasienforschung. In: Praxis: Schweizerische Rundschau für Medizin. Vol. 43, nr. 41, 14. October 1954, p. 872–878, PMID 13224618.
- Sutermeister, Hans Martin (1955). "Screen–hypnosis". British Journal of Medical Hypnotism. 7 (1): 35–37. In English.
- G. Ch. Lichtenberg und die Medizin. In: Münchner Medizinische Wochenschrift. Vol. 97, nr. 39, 30 September 1955, p. 1288–1290, PMID 13265751.
- Mit Werner Bärtschi-Rochaix: Zur Pathophysiologie des Lachens, zugleich ein Beitrag über licht-aktivierte Lachanfälle. In: Confinia Neurologica – Grenzgebiete der Neurologie. Vol. 15, nr. 1, 1955, p. 10–32, doi:10.1159/000105337, PMID 14390935.
- Über die Fortschritte der Sprachpsychologie und Sprachtherapie. In: Gesundheit und Wohlfahrt. 1955 (39 pages).
- Der heutige Stand der psychosomatischen Forschung. In: Ars Medici: Organ des praktischen Arztes. Vol. 45, nr. 5 (pages 327–337) and nr.6 (pages 394–404).
- Film und Psychohygiene. In: Praxis: Schweizerische Rundschau für Medizin. Vol. 44, nr. 15, 14 April 1955, p. 328–334, PMID 14384673.
- Vom ärztlichen Ethos. In: Praxis: Schweizerische Rundschau für Medizin. Vol. 44, nr. 31, 4 August 1955, p. 708–711, PMID 13254612.
- Das Rätsel um Robert Schumanns Krankheit. Ein Beitrag zum Genieproblem. In: Praxis: Schweizerische Rundschau für Medizin. Vol. 48, nr. 51, 17 December 1959, p. 1177–1185, PMID 13835817.
- Kriminalpsychologie und Medizin. In: Praxis: Schweizerische Rundschau für Medizin. Vol. 49, nr. 23, 9 June 1960, p. 580–588, PMID 13835816. Book review:

- Rudolf Koch: Buchbesprechung von Kriminalpsychologie und Medizin (1960). In: International Journal of Legal Medicine. Vol. 51, nr. 1, p. 130. doi:10.1007/BF00574055

- Das Föhnproblem im Rahmen der modernen Meteoropathologie. Ein Beitrag zur Psychosomatik der Wetterfühligkeit. In: Praxis: Schweizerische Rundschau für Medizin. Vol. 49, nr. 48, 1 December 1960, p. 1136–1142.
- Autohipnosis del espectador cinematográfico. In: Revista Latino-Americana de Hipnosis Clínica. 1960, 1, p. 23-24.
- Zur Psychologie des Justizirrtums. In: Der Psychologe: Psychologische Monatsschrift. 1962. (The article includes a summary of the work Du und der Justizirrtum announced by Sutermeister (the later published Summa Iniuria: Ein Pitaval der Justizirrtümer.)
- Medizin im Schatten der Schlagworte. In: Therapie der Gegenwart: Monatsschrift für praktische Medizin. Vol. 102, nr. 10, October 1963, p. 1087–1097, PMID 14096239.
- Psychosomatik des Musikerlebens. Prolegomena zur Musiktherapie. In: Acta Psychotherapeutica et Psychosomatica. Vol. 12, nr. 2, 1964, p. 91–110, doi:10.1159/000285721, PMID 14155994.
- Der heutige Stand der psychosomatischen Medizin. In: Ars Medici. Vol. 54, nr. 7, 1964, p. 473–489.
- Justizirrtum um einen Mord. Zur Revision des Jaccoudprozesses. In: Beobachter. 1966.
- Dringliche Revision des schweizerischen Familienrechts betreffend Schutz der unehelichen Mutter und des unehelichen Kindes sowie betreffend Adoption. In: Praxis: Schweizerische Rundschau für Medizin. Vol. 56, nr. 41, 12 October 1967, p. 1391–1394, PMID 5633079.
- Zum Tag der Menschenrechte. Pamphlet, 10. December 1968. (In: Hans Martin Sutermeister: Summa Iniuria: Ein Pitaval der Justizirrtümer. Basel, 1976, p. 659–660.)
- Dualismus: Psychoanalyse und Neuropsychiatrie. Der Versuch zu einer Synthese muß aus den Ansätzen kommen. In: Ärztliche Praxis: Die Zeitung des Arztes in Klinik und Praxis. Vol. 25, nr. 88, 3 November 1973, p. 3948.
- Brauchen wir ein Bundeskriminalamt? In: Ring (Magazine of the Ring of Independents). 1973.
- Die ‚Fristenlösung' und der Hippokrateseid. In: Schweizerische Rundschau für Medizin “Praxis”. Vol. 63, nr. 36, 10 September 1974, p. 1101–1103, PMID 4438241.
- Schutz– und Erholungsregressionen. Psychotische Bildnerei als Wegweiser zu einer „Kunsttherapie“. In: Ärztliche Praxis: Die Zeitung des Arztes in Klinik und Praxis. Vol. 29, nr. 18, 1 March 1977, p. 844–846.

=== Other cultural manifestation ===
As a member of the so–called bernese nonconformists, Sutermeister spoke in the Junkere 37 (sometimes called Speakers' Corner of Bern). Some fragments of these manifestations are traceable in the Nonkonformismus Archiv Fredi Lerch.

While Sutermeister was not known for his aesthetic work, he did compose two “little waltz” and a poem:

- Hans Möhrlen (pseudonym): Kleiner Walzer für Violine und Piano. 1949. Published by the Swiss National Library, 2011.
- Hans Möhrlen (pseudonym): Kleiner Walzer für Klavier. 1949. Published by the Swiss National Library, 2011. Kleiner Walzer arranged for piano accordion is available free of charge, under Creative Commons, Sutermeister Heirs.
- Medizynischer Liebeskummer (frei nach Heine). Published in Der Schweizerische Beobachter between 1961 and 1971.

== Personal life ==
Hans Martin married Ingeborg Marie Schulzke, with whom he had three daughters.
