= Pitaval (disambiguation) =

Pitaval may refer to:

- Pitaval, in general any collection of causes célèbres
- Der neue Pitaval, a specific collection of causes célèbres, published in 60 volumes between 1842 and 1890 by Julius Eduard Hitzig and Willibald Alexis
- Summa Iniuria: Ein Pitaval der Justizirrtümer, a specific collection of causes célèbres, published in 1976 by Hans Martin Sutermeister

Pitaval is a surname and may refer to:

- François Gayot de Pitaval (1673–1743), French advocate, who compiled a famous collection of causes célèbres
- John Baptist Pitaval (1858–1928), French-born clergyman of the Roman Catholic Church
