= Summa Iniuria =

Book about miscarriages of justice

Summa Iniuria: Ein Pitaval der Justizirrtümer
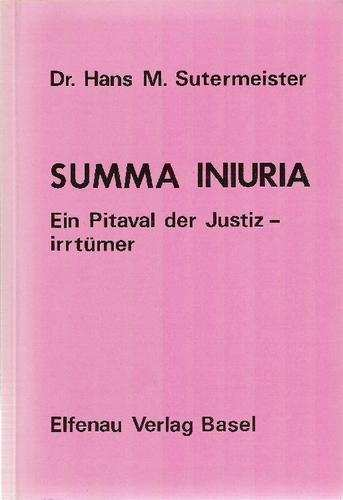
- Author: Hans M. Sutermeister
- Language: German
- Subject: Miscarriage of justice
- Genre: non-fiction
- Publication date: 1976
- Publication place: Switzerland
- Media type: Print (Paperback)
- Pages: 810
- ISBN: 3226000969

Summa Iniuria: Ein Pitaval der Justizirrtümer (Summa Iniuria: A Pitaval of Miscarriages of Justice) is a collection of causes célèbres by the Swiss author Hans M. Sutermeister. It is considered “one of the most detailed documentations about miscarriages of justice in the German language”. It is inspired by Voltaire′s early activism against French miscarriages of justice of puritan origin, as well as by Arthur Conan Doyle′s criminalistic approaches.

== Summary ==
The book proposes a legal reform for Switzerland which has never been realized because of political controversies. The Maria Popescu, Pierre Jaccoud, and Vera Brühne cases are discussed in detail, as Sutermeister was involved in the criminal researches. The George Edalji case serves, among others, to illustrate the issue of faulty expertises. The main part consists of the so–called “Hirschberg test”, based on Max Hirschberg's categories of causes of judicial errors.

=== Hirschberg test ===
The “Hirschberg test” begins with critique against the preliminary inquiries concerning Josef Issels and Bruno Gröning.

The phenomenon of mis-identification is illustrated by the Joseph Lesurques, Billy Armstrong, Adolph Beck, Leopold Hilsner, Menahem Mendel Beilis, Sacco and Vanzetti, Joe Hill, Caryl Chessman, Charles Townsend, James Hanratty, John Dickman, Rubin Carter, Jerome Frank, Will Purvis, Anna Anderson cases, a large list of experiences which led to wrongful court decisions and which serve to illustrate also other items of the “Hirschberg test”.

The issue of uncritical assessment of guilty plea is illustrated by the cases of Timothy Evans, Harold Israel, Marinus van der Lubbe, Albert DeSalvo, Jack the Ripper, Mata Hari, Renate von Natzmer, Danny Escobedo, Richard Speck, and Alfred George Hinds, among others.

In the chapter about the impact of fellow convicts on dispensation of justice is considered the judgment of Barbara Graham; and concerning the witness account, the Felix Fechenbach case, the Guillaume Affair, and the cases of Antoine Argoud, Beate Klarsfeld, Milan Bogunovic, Baader-Meinhof, Raoul Villain, Anton Graf von Arco auf Valley, and Maximilian Kolbe. In the cases of Marguerite Steinheil, Leo Frank, Samuel Sheppard, Karl Stauffer, and Ronald Light, the lies of the accused would have offered guilty proof.

Circumstantial evidence lawsuits are illustrated by the cases of Frederick Seddon, Marie Besnard, Steven Truscott, Graham Frederick Young, and some white-collar crimes. Suggestibility and emotional biases of the jury as causes of wrongful court decisions are showed by the cases of Jesse Hill Ford, Joan Little, and Alger Hiss.

The relationship between miscarriages of justice and public morality is analysed through the cases of Henriette Caillaux, Ruth Ellis, Sir Ewan Forbes, 11th Baronet, Arthur Gray, Horst Schumann, Joan Berry, Baader-Meinhof, Timothy Leary, Patricia Hearst, Kurt Gerstein, Paul Grüninger, Rudolf Roessler, David Frankfurter, Pyotr Grigorenko, Vladimir Bukovsky, Derek Bentley, Edith Thompson, Ivar Kreuger, Stavisky Affair, Harald Feller, Carl Lutz, Viola Liuzzo, Wilma Montesi, Horst Wessel, among many others.

The case of Jacques Isorni serves to illustrate a certain relationship between law and ethics.

The author concludes by briefly analysing other aspects of misleading or other judgments revising the John Thomas Scopes, Carl von Ossietzky, Theodor Lessing, Bruno Lüdke, Persecution of Jehovah's Witnesses in Nazi Germany, Hans Paasche, Ludwig Quidde, and Weiße Rose cases.

== Reception ==
The book has the appearance of a patchwork obtained by stitching together legal and controversial political parts, as has been criticized by German jurist Klaus Volk and the Austrian Nazi medical writer Otto Scrinzi. For the German criminal law expert Karl Peters, on the other hand, the book represents a milestone in the series of works about miscarriages of justice which comes to terms with many failures of post-World War II criminal judgments in Germany and Switzerland, therefore completing a certain continuing effort which has its history in the works of Erich Sello, Max Alsberg, Albert Hellwig, Max Hirschberg, and Heinrich Jagusch.
