= Jaccoud =

Jaccoud is a French surname. Notable people with the surname include:

- Jessica Jaccoud (born 1983), Swiss politician
- Pierre Jaccoud (1905–1996), Swiss lawyer and politician
  - Jaccoud case
- Sigismond Jaccoud (1830–1913), Swiss physician
