= Anton Gordonoff =

Russian-Swiss pharmacologist and toxicologist

Anton Gordonoff (3 February 1893 in Russia - 1960s) was a Russian-Swiss pharmacologist and toxicologist.

Gordonoff studied pharmacology at the Universities of Bern and Nancy and finished his studies in 1921. In 1926 he received his habilitation from the University of Bern. Later the same university appointed him a professor of pharmacology and toxicology; he headed the Department of Pharmacology at the School of Medicine and was also a member of the Swiss Commission on Medicine and Drugs and of the Swiss Association for Clinical Neurophysiology.

As the main expert for the defence of Maria Popescu, in 1953, together with Georges Brunschvig, he achieved a second re-investigation of the case. He tested the accusation of poisoning by Veronal, and established that in the 1945 indictment which had led to Popescu's dubious conviction, there had been confusion between it and Quadronox. When Gordonoff then openly accused the forensic specialist François Naville of incompetence, the prosecutor, Charles Cornu, and the presiding judge "stuttered . . . something about 'unavoidable errors'". Popescu was thus considered to have a good case for appeal.

== Selected publications ==
- "Gibt es eine Bronchialperistaltik? VI. Mitteilung. Ein Beitrag zum Studium der Physiologie und Pharmakologie der Sekretomotorik". Research in Experimental Medicine 97.1 (December 1936) ISSN 0300-9130
- "Physiologie und Pharmakologie des Expektorationsvorganges". Reviews of Physiology, Biochemistry and Pharmacology 40.1 (December 1938). ISSN 1617-5786
- "Über Triorthokresylphosphat-Vergiftungen". Archives of Toxicology 11.1 (December 1940)
