= Louis de la Pivardière =

French noble (1661–1702)

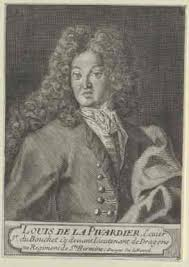
- Portrait of Pivardière from his 1698 legal brief
- Born: Louis de La Pivardière; 15 November 1661; Poulaines, France
- Died: 1702 (aged 40–41); Unknown
- Other name: Louis Dubouchet
- Occupations: Nobleman, soldier
- Known for: Central figure of late 17th-century cause célèbre

Louis de la Pivardière (15 November 1661 – 1702), also known as Louis Dubouchet, was a French nobleman. His life is unremarkable save for the court case centered on him at the tail-end of the 17th century. His wife was on trial for his murder, though he reappeared during the case, with multiple people confirming his identity. It was an early example of the cause célèbres that would dominate the end of the 18th century, and it raised new questions about nobility and social status in Old Regime France.

== Early life ==
Location of the Berry relative to the rest of France.

Pivardière was born in the Berry on 15 November 1661 to Antoine de la Pivardière and his second wife, Marie de Berthoulat. He was not in a position to take advantage of his inherited nobility, and the first two decades of his life are marked by attempts to make a name for himself in the military. The reigning Louis XIV's territorial ambitions gave him many chances to do so. He served in the Franco-Dutch War and, several years later, fought in the Battle of Chiny. Regardless, he was unable to advance in the military. In 1687, he married Marguerite Chauvelin and became seigneur de Narbonne, the Chauvelin family estate. He and his wife had a daughter in 1688, but soon after the Nine Years War began and Pivardière again served in the military. The war went catastrophically for France and Pivardière yet again could not advance in the military, despite years of trying. By 1697, his ambition had nearly emptied his coffers.

== Alleged murder and initial investigations ==
On 15 August 1697 Pivardière unexpectedly returned to Narbonne. Amidst rumors of his possible infidelity in Auxerre, he returned from his military duties with no escort and a lame horse. He and Chauvelin had a falling out and slept in separate rooms. By the next morning, Pivardière had disappeared and the front gate to the estate was open. During the ensuing weeks, when Pivardière did not reappear, rumors began to spread that Chauvelin had murdered her husband, and François Morin and Jean Bonnet, judges from Châtillon, launched a criminal investigation.

The investigation resulted in little hard evidence against Chauvelin, likely because of the nearly two-month delay in an actual crime scene investigation. Most notably, they had not discovered a body. All Morin and Bonnet had to show for their efforts were several transcripts and two maidservants, Catherine Lemoyne and Marguerite Mercier, in their custody as witnesses. Chauvelin and the prior Charost, an alleged conspirator in the murder, had disappeared as well. The following months resulted in Lemoyne and Mercier's testimony of the events of 15 August changing wildly, perhaps due to influence from Morin and Bonnet.

In January 1698, Pivardière allegedly reappeared, exonerating Chauvelin and Charost. Multiple witnesses confirmed his identity, but the momentum stalled when Lemoyne and Mercier asserted that the man was not Pivardière. The momentum took another drastic shift when the man claiming to be Pivardière disappeared again, and even more in February with the arrest and imprisonment of the prior Charost. In May, Chauvelin voluntarily imprisoned herself in a Parisian prison. Due to this as well as the swelling tide of publicity surrounding the case, the court venue shifted to the Parlement of Paris.

== Trial at the Parlement of Paris ==
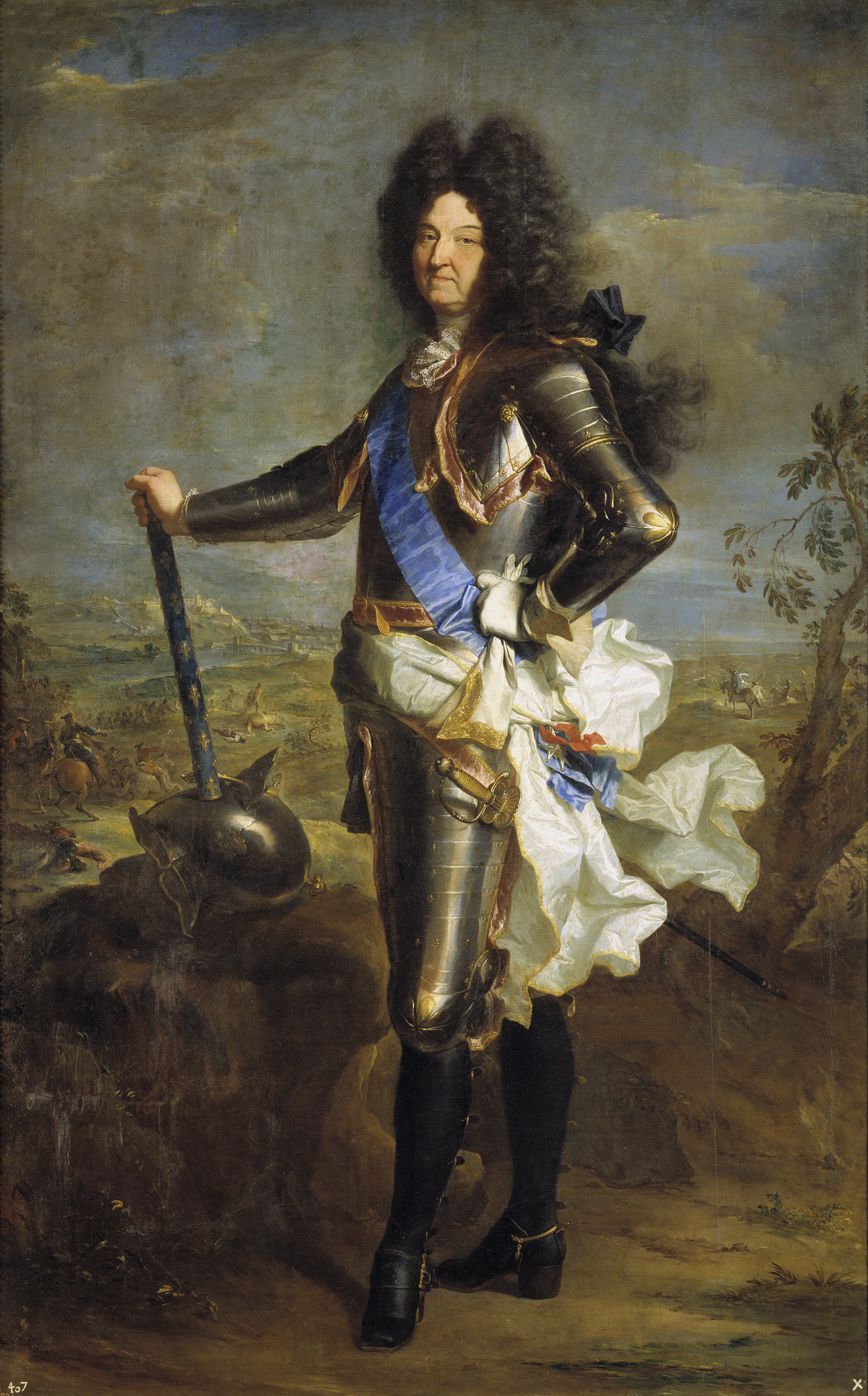
King Louis XIV, depicted in 1701.

The first hearing in Paris of the Pivardière case was on 10 May 1698. The biggest question the defense had to answer was this: If Pivardière was still alive, why would he not come to Paris to exonerate his wife and the prior? Chauvelin and Charost's attorneys argued that it was because Pivardière feared an arrest for bigamy, a crime that was punishable by death in Old Regime France. They asserted that in 1695, Pivardière had taken the name Louis Dubouchet, moved to Auxerre, and married Marie-Elisabeth Pillard, the daughter of a deceased innkeeper. They further asserted that Pivardière had kept up fake correspondence with his first wife that gave the impression that he was still in the military. Upon his return to Narbonne on 15 August 1697, he discovered that Chauvelin suspected his infidelity and deemed it unwise to remain there.

Logically, according to Chauvelin and Charost's attorneys, Pivardière did not want to travel to Paris without being granted a safe conduct that would protect him from being arrested on bigamy charges. The safe conduct was not granted, however, and the man claiming to be Pivardière did not show up in court. On July 23, the Parlement of Paris rendered its verdict, which ordered a transferral of the witnesses, suspects (save for Chauvelin), and evidence to Chartres, where a new investigation would begin. The court also ordered the arrest of the man claiming to be Pivardière.

In August, King Louis XIV granted the safe conduct, and Pivardière traveled to Paris. In September, he voluntarily imprisoned himself and issued an appeal of the July ruling that he was an imposter. By December, the king had upheld the appeal and ordered a retrial. The court, now able to interrogate the man claiming to be Pivardière, put the case to rest in July 1699. Pivardière's identity was confirmed, which exonerated Chauvelin and Charost. The fates of the maidservants were less ideal—Lemoyne died in prison and Mercier was found guilty of giving false testimony. Her punishment was to be publicly humiliated, branded with the fleur-de-lis, and banished from the jurisdiction of the Parlement of Paris.

== Significance ==
No record of Pivardière exists after the court confirmed his identity. It is unknown where and when he died. The court case surrounding his supposed murder, however, gained considerable public attention and, at the turn of the 18th century, raised questions about judicial corruption and nobility. It also served as one of Henri François d'Aguesseau's most notable court cases as the king's Attorney General.

Pivardière willingly gave up his noble title and identity to marry an undistinguished young woman in Auxerre. Nobility was typically seen as desirable, but Pivardière's experiences highlighted a less glamorous side of nobility. His military ambitions fell flat, his holdings were inconsequential, and he held little to no influence in the workings of the world around him..Though the scandal surrounding his supposed murder was bizarre, the reason for his disappearance was almost even more bizarre. The harsh verdict against the maidservant Mercier also highlighted the awkward workings of the judicial system in late 17th-century France. She was found guilty of giving false testimony, but it was likely that Morin and Bonnet coerced her into giving them testimony that would work in their favor. With Lemoyne dead, Mercier took the fall for the failures of the court system.

== Legacy ==
The sensational story of Louis de la Pivardière seemed like it was written for the stage. In fact, it was: French dramatist Florent Carton Dancourt adapted Pivardière's story for the stage in Le Mari retrouvé (The Husband Returned), which was staged in Paris in late 1698 to massive audiences.

The story was recounted by François Richer in a popular pitaval. This source was used by E. T. A. Hoffmann for his short story The Marquise de la Pivardiere (1820).

More recently, in 1972 a French made-for-TV dramatization of the case entitled L'Etrange trépas de Monsieur de la Pivardière (The Strange Death of Monsieur de la Pivardière) aired on the French National Broadcasting system. In 1990, director Antonín Moskalyk (Czechoslovakia) created an episode Písmo (Handwriting) of the TV series Dobrodružství kriminalistiky (Adventure in Criminological Investigation) inspired by the case.
