= Maria Popesco =

Romanian-Swiss socialite and convicted murderer

Maria Popesco, wife of Victor Popescu (September 4, 1919 – 2004), was a Romanian-born socialite, convicted murderer and memoirist, whose case was at the center of one of the few miscarriages of justice in Switzerland.

Born in Bucharest and the daughter in law of Stelian Popescu, a political figure and former Justice Minister, Popesco was arrested in 1945 in Geneva and accused of having murdered her mother in law Lelia Popescu (on June 26, 1945) and her maid Lina Mory (died on July 25, 1945), and for an assassination attempt against her father in law. She was sentenced to life imprisonment, even though critics believe that her guilt has never been proven.

Particularly Georges Brunschvig and Anton Gordonoff, two main scientific experts in the case, accused the involved François Naville for wrong arguments concerning the confusion between Veronal and Quadronox. She was finally amnestied in 1957. The following years Popescu wrote her memoires; she married, lived in Valais and had a son.

== Contemporary researches ==
According to the journalist Jean-Noël Cuénod this case was one of the seven most spectacular trials in Geneva, among others like Sissi (Empress Elisabeth of Austria), Léon Nicole, Georges Oltramare, Pierre Jaccoud et Frédéric Dard.

== Works ==
- Maria Popesco. "Entre deux mercredis" Éditions La Baconnière, 1961. 198 pages.
- Maria Popescu. "Von Mittwoch bis Mittwoch" Éditions Paul Haupt, 1961. Traduction: Bee Juker. ASIN B0000BMFY8
- Maria Popescu. "Între două miercuri" Éditions Corint, 2018. Traduction: Rodica Vintilă. ISBN 978-606-793-390-1
- William Matthey-Claudet. " Une erreur judicière? L' Affaire Popesco" Imprimerie Montandon & Cie, Fleurier (Ntel).
- Antoine Jacques & Pierre Bellemare. "Les Dossiers Extraordinaires de Pierre Bellmare" Éditions Fayard, 1976.
- Yolanda Eminescu. "Din Istoria Marilor Procese" Éditions Junimea, Iasi, 1992.
- Jean-Noël Cuenod. "De l'Assassinat de Sissi à l'Acquittement de Mikhaïlov, Un siècle de Procès à Genève" Éditions Tribune de Genève, 1999.
