= Pitaval =

Term for legal causes célèbres

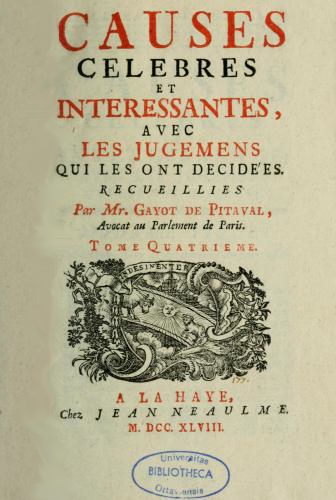
François Gayot de Pitaval, Causes célèbres

A Pitaval is a collection of causes célèbres.

The name derived from the French advocate François Gayot de Pitaval (1673–1743), who published several volumes of causes célèbres et intéressantes between 1734 and 1743.

Early works were mainly written for legal professionals but later Pitavals also became popular amongst other readers. In the 19th and early 20th century the idea of publishing criminal cases quickly spread in Europe. Pitavals became a well-known literary genre, which was often imitated.

Examples for Pitavals are Merkwürdige Rechtsfälle (1808/11) by Paul Johann Anselm Ritter von Feuerbach, Der neue Pitaval (1842–1890) by Julius Eduard Hitzig and Willibald Alexis, the Prager Pitaval (1931) by Egon Erwin Kisch, Der neue Pitaval (1963) by Herrmann Mostars and Robert Adolf Stemmle, Berühmte Strafprozesse by Maximilian Jactas, Prozesse, die unsere Welt bewegten by Curt Riess and Summa Iniuria: Ein Pitaval der Justizirrtümer by Hans M. Sutermeister (1976).

Many notable authors drew their plots from Pitaval's editions. For example, E. T. A. Hoffmann's short story The Marquise de la Pivardiere (1820) is based on a real criminal case from 1697 (as described by François Richer).

From 1957 to 1978 the East German TV series Fernsehpitaval depicted German true crime cases. In 1982 and 1986, the Czechoslovak TV aired the series A Small Pitaval From A Large City based on true crime cases in Prague, too.
