= Lake Thun and the Stockhorn Mountains =

Series of landscape paintings by Ferdinand Hodler

Lake Thun and the Stockhorn Mountains (1910), National Galleries Scotland, acquired 1975

Lake Thun and the Stockhorn Mountains (German: Thunersee mit Stockhornkette) is a series of landscape paintings by the Swiss artist Ferdinand Hodler, depicting the Stockhorn range as seen from across Lake Thun in Switzerland. The view was one of Hodler's favourite subjects, and the Swiss Institute for Art Research (SIK-ISEA) counts thirty-three known versions, painted between 1905 and 1913.

Individual versions appear under varying titles in catalogues and collections; one painting c. 1912, for example, has been catalogued both as Thunersee mit Stockhornkette and as Die Stockhornkette mit wolkigem Himmel (German for 'The Stockhorn chain with Cloudy sky').

== Description ==
Thunersee mit Stockhornkette (c. 1913), Galerie Kornfeld

Hodler repeatedly painted the Stockhorn mountains from the opposite side of Lake Thun, generally focusing on the atmosphere of the landscape through subjective interpretation. The paintings are associated with his theory of parallelism, which emphasized the symmetry and rhythm he believed formed the basis of human society.

The catalogue raisonné of Thunersee mit Stockhornkette, a painting circa 1912 from the series, portrays a dense bank of cloud whose shape and mass echo the mountain range below it. The solid and the fleeting mirror each other through repetition, an expression of the parallelist order found throughout Hodler's work.

== Provenance dispute ==
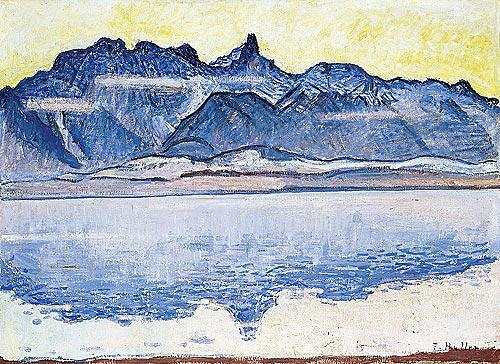
Thunersee mit Stockhornkette, c. 1913, Kunstmuseum St. Gallen

One version, painted c. 1913, belongs to the Simon und Charlotte Frick Foundation and is on permanent loan to the Kunstmuseum St. Gallen. Simon Frick, a former member of the government of the canton of St. Gallen, and his wife bought it in good faith at auction at Galerie Kornfeld in Bern in 1985. The sale catalogue gave the painting an unbroken Swiss provenance, which the Swiss Institute for Art Research (SIK-ISEA) accepted at the time.

That provenance proved to be wrong: the provenances of two versions of the motif had been confused. According to the Independent Commission of Experts (the Bergier Commission), the St. Gallen painting had been sold in the 1920s to Max Silberberg, a German Jewish industrialist and collector in Breslau. Under pressure from the Nazi regime, Silberberg was forced to sell most of his collection from 1935 onward through the Paul Graupe auction house in Berlin. Silberberg and his wife Johanna were stripped of their assets and deported in May 1942, probably to Theresienstadt. Both were murdered; the exact date and place of their deaths are unrecorded.

The Hodler was offered at Graupe on 23 March 1935 and sold for 3,800 reichsmark; the buyer is unknown. Its whereabouts are undocumented until 1946, when the Bern physician Bernhard Walthard bought it from the Zurich art dealer Fritz Nathan, who had emigrated from Munich to Switzerland in 1936. It remains unclear whether the 1935 sale resulted from persecution, business circumstances, or both.

The Neue Zürcher Zeitung first reported the restitution claim in 2003; Silberberg's heirs sought either the painting's return or half of its market value. The Silberberg estate argued that the sale had been forced by racial persecution and the Nazi party's forced purchase of Silberberg's villa, while the heirs of Simon Frick maintained that his purchase had been legally and morally sound. Whether the painting should be considered looted art under the 1998 Washington Principles remained disputed. After years of negotiations mediated by the museum, an agreement was reached in 2023 under which the painting remains on public display in Kunstmuseum St. Gallen.

The museum also announced that seven further works from the Frick Foundation would become permanent loans.

== Gallery ==
Thunersee mit Stockhornkette, c. 1904, Kunstmuseum Bern

Thunersee mit Stockhornkette, 1904

Thunersee mit Stockhornkette, 1910, Hamburger Kunsthalle

Thunersee mit Stockhornkette, 1910, Kunsthalle Mannheim

Thunersee mit Stockhornkette in Wolken, c. 1912

Stockhornkette und Thunersee im Winter, 1913

Thunersee mit Stockhornkette, c. 1913

Thunersee mit Stockhornkette, c. 1913, Wallraf–Richartz Museum
