= Isaac Gubel =

- Born: February 23, 1927; Bolinia, Poland
- Died: March 21, 1983 (aged 56); Buenos Aires, Argentina
- Occupations: Psychiatrist and hypnotist
- Spouse: Isabel Bety Jaskelson

Isaac Gubel (February 2, 1927 – March 21, 1983) was an Argentine psychiatrist and hypnotist.

== Life ==
Gubel came from Buenos Aires, Argentina. He worked with Milton H. Erickson in the United States and co-founded in Buenos Aires, in order to spread Erickson′s hypnotherapy in his own country, the Sociedad Argentina de Hipnoterapia (“Argentine Society of Hypnotherapy”). He was also in contact with Alfonso Caycedo and founded the Sociedad Argentina de Sofrología y Medicina Psicosomática (SASMEP) (“Argentine Society of Sophrology and Psychosomatics”). In 1959, he founded the Revista Latino-Americana de Hipnosis Clínica; he also was a correspondent editor of the American Journal of Clinical Hypnosis and of the British Journal of Medical Hypnotism. In these magazines and others, he published numerous specialized articles in English and Spanish. He researched and gave lectures in Brazil, Mexico and Venezuela, among other places. He is regarded as “one of the greatest exponents of global hypnotherapy” (“uno dei massimi esponenti della ipnoterapia mondiale”) as well as a “failed psychiatrist” (“malogrado psiquiatra”).

The alternative medical Instituto Gubel de Investigación y Docencia en Hipnosis, Psicoterapias Breves y Medicina Psicosomática ("Gubel Institute for Hypnotic, Psychotherapic and Psychosomatic Research and Teaching") in Buenos Aires bears his name.
