= Klaus Peter Cadsky =

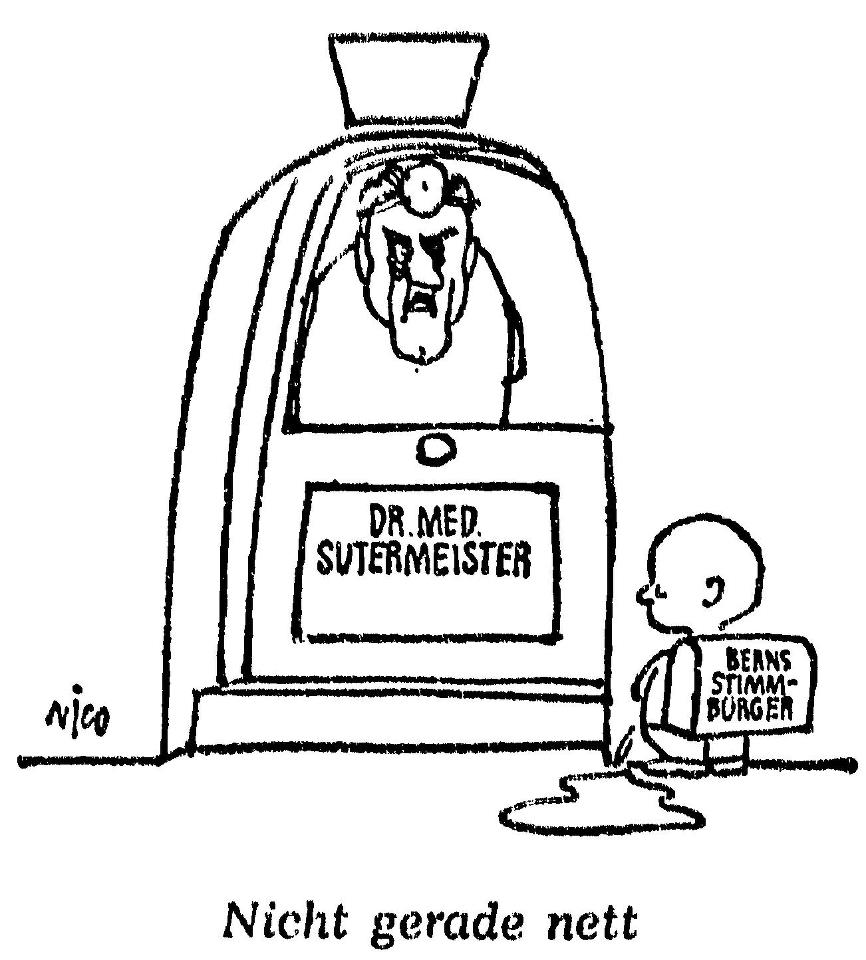
One of approximately 35′000 cartoons that Nico drew for the Tages-Anzeiger: Bernese city counciller Sutermeister's deselection after the schoolbook affair.

Klaus Peter Robert Cadsky (born 3 August 1937 in Hannover; died 11 March 2011 in Solothurn), known as Nico, was a Swiss German cartoonist.

He is well known for his caricatures of politicians published in Luzerner Neuste Nachrichten, Nebelspalter, Stern, Tages-Anzeiger, Blick and in journals of the AZ Medien Gruppe. He also worked for the Schweizer Fernsehen as a live cartoonist.
