= Jessica Jaccoud =

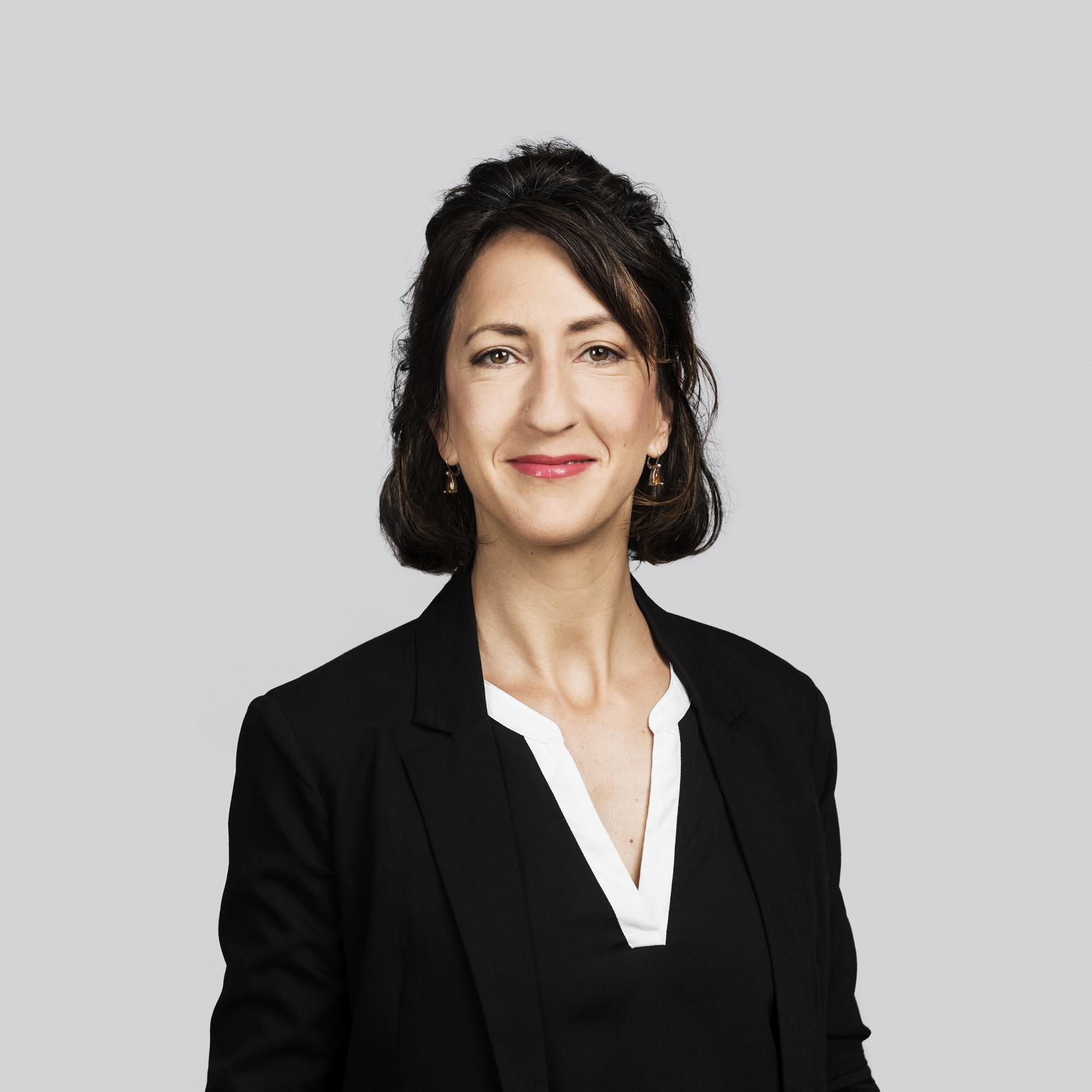
- Jessica Jaccoud in 2023

Member of the National Council
- Incumbent
- Assumed office 2023

Personal details
- Born: 16 August 1983 (age 42) Lausanne, Switzerland
- Party: Social Democratic Party of Switzerland

Jessica Jaccoud (born 16 August 1983 in Lausanne; resident of Montilliez) is a Swiss politician (SP). She has been a member of the National Council since 2023.

== Life ==
Jessica Jaccoud's father is an engineer. She has one brother. She initially lived in Crissier and, from 1991, in Nyon.

After graduating from high school, she studied legal science at the University of Geneva and worked for four years in event management at UEFA headquarters in Nyon before resuming her studies at the University of Neuchâtel. She was admitted to the bar in 2015.

Jaccoud initially worked for a legal expenses insurance company before joining a law firm in Vevey in March 2016 , where she became a partner. She specializes in tenancy law.

She is married, has one child and lives in Rolle.

== Politics ==
Jaccoud joined the Social Democratic Party of Switzerland (SP) in 2010. She was a member of the municipal council (legislature) of Nyon from 2011 to 2018 and a member of the Grand Council of the Canton of Vaud from 2014. From 2016, she was vice-president of the SP Vaud, and from 2018 to 2022 she was president.

She was elected to the National Council in the 2023 Swiss federal election. On 6 September 2025, she was elected to the co-presidency of the SP Women of Switzerland, [ 10 ] succeeding Martine Docourt.

== See also ==
- List of members of the National Council of Switzerland (2023–2027)
