= Anton Schaller =

Swiss journalist, politician (born 1944)

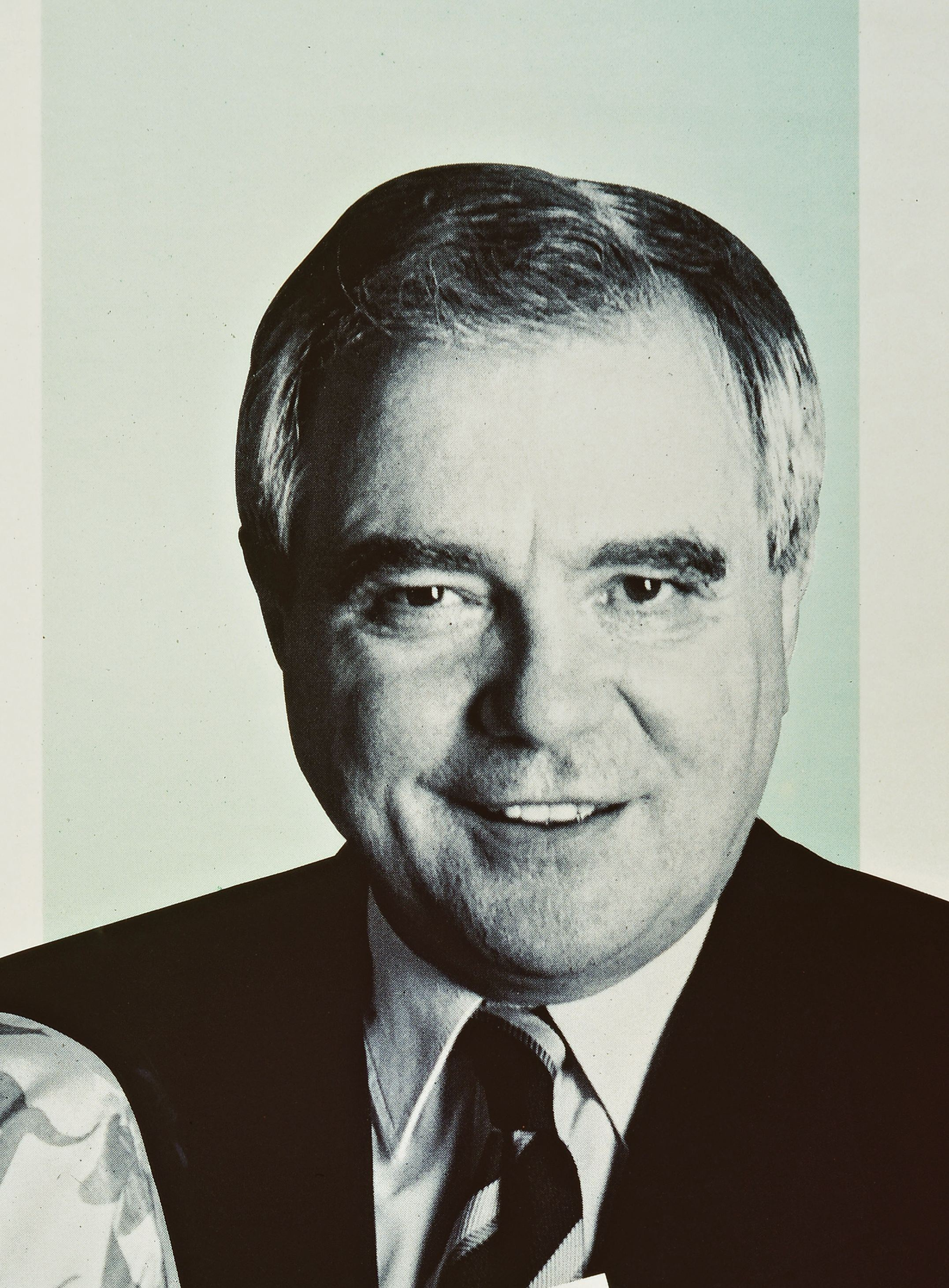
Anton Schaller

Anton Schaller (born 11 October 1944 in Nottwil) is a Swiss journalist, news presenter and politician (LdU).

Schaller was chief editor of the evening news Tagesschau on the Swiss television channel SF 1 and directed the Federal Palace editorial team. In 1999 he was elected to the National Council of Switzerland as the last representative of the Alliance of Independents.
