= Peter Sutermeister =

Peter Sutermeister (May 28, 1916 – January 3, 2003) was a Swiss lawyer, writer and opera librettist.

Sutermeister got his Ph.D. at University of Bern. He wrote the texts for Heinrich Sutermeister's (his brother) operas Niobe and Raskolnikoff, as well as biographies of Felix Mendelssohn Bartholdy and Robert Schumann. From 1953 to 1966 he was the Secretary–General of the Swiss National Science Foundation.

== Translation ==
- John L. McHale. Athos: miraculous icons: introduction: Peter Sutermeister. Hallwag, 1968
