= François Gayot de Pitaval =

French advocate (1673–1743)

François Gayot de Pitaval (1673–1743) was a French advocate.

He compiled a famous collection of causes célèbres. Later the literary genre of true crime collections became known as Pitaval.

== Biography ==
He was the son of Jean-Jacques Gayot de la Rajasse, advisor to the Lyon Presidial court in 1664, elected alderman of Lyon (in 1683-1684), and Hélène de la Roue. He married Anne Curnillon. They had one daughter, Andrée, who was first married to Joseph Sorbière and then to Jean Théodore Bourchers, a bourgeois from Lyon.

Gayot de Pitaval studied in Paris to become a priest, but left the church to join the army. At the age of fifty, he resumed his studies to become a lawyer. In addition to his classic work Causes célèbres, which includes accounts of the Martin Guerre trial (in Volume I), the Affair of the Poisons (in Volume I), the Loudun possessions (in Volume II), and the murder of the Marquise de Ganges (in Volume V), he wrote numerous books of historical, gallant, and poetic anecdotes.

== Works ==
- Causes célèbres et intéressantes, avec les jugemens qui les ont décidées (1734–1741 in 18 volumes)
