= Georges Brunschvig =

Swiss lawyer

Georges Brunschvig in 1973.

Georges Brunschvig (21 February 1908 – 14 October 1973) was a Swiss lawyer and president of the Swiss Federation of Jewish Communities (SIG). Internationally, he is best known for representing the plaintiff in the 1934–35 "Berne Trial".

== Berne Trial ==
Born in Bern to a family of Jewish horse traders, Brunschvig studied law at the University of Bern and passed the bar exam in 1933. In 1934, he founded a law firm on the Marktgasse in Bern and married his childhood friend Odette Wyler, with whom he had two daughters.

At the age of 25, in one of his first cases as an attorney, he and his colleague Emil Raas took up a criminal case by the SIG against the Nationale Front, a movement of Swiss Nazi sympathizers. At the time, Frontists had taken to distributing antisemitic pamphlets on the streets, including The Protocols of the Elders of Zion. Brunschvig won the case, later known by historians as the "Berne Trial", by a thorough debunking of the Protocols. The defendants were convicted by the Bernese district court of violating a Bernese statute prohibiting the distribution of "immoral, obscene or brutalizing" texts. Even though they were acquitted on appeal – the Cantonal Supreme Court held that the Protocols, while false, did not violate the statute because they were used as a means of political propaganda – Brunschvig had achieved the SIG's principal goal: a court holding debunking the Protocols.

== World War II ==
During World War II, Brunschvig served as a captain with the military court of Bern. As president of the Bernese Jewish community and a board member of the SIG, Brunschvig was among the first in Switzerland to receive word of the deportation of German Jews to extermination camps. However, his and the SIG's efforts to stop the expulsion of Jewish refugees to Germany by Swiss authorities were largely fruitless.

In August 1942, a Belgian Jewish couple were arrested by police in the Jewish Cemetery in Bern after having fled from Brussels through France to Switzerland on bicycles. Despite Brunschvig's intercession with the authorities, the couple was expelled from Switzerland the day after their arrest; after the war, Brunschvig found out that they had been killed in Auschwitz. This incident caused Brunschvig to abandon the restraint he had previously imposed upon himself so as not to lose what influence he had with the authorities. Through the journalist Hermann Böschenstein, he had the incident made public in the Basler Nationalzeitung. The resulting public outcry caused Swiss border controls to be loosened temporarily.

== Trial attorney ==
In his work as an attorney, Brunschvig participated in several other high-profile criminal cases. From 1943 on, he was counsel to David Frankfurter, the assassin of Swiss Nazi leader Wilhelm Gustloff, and he was instrumental in achieving Frankfurter's pardon in 1945. He also represented the defence in the trials of Maria Popesco (1946–55), Max Ulrich (1957) and Ben Gal (1963). In 1969, he successfully defended Mordechai Rachamim, an El Al sky marshal who had shot and killed a Palestinian terrorist after the man had opened fire on passengers in Zürich Airport. Rachamim was acquitted on account of self-defence.

== Lobbying for Israel ==
In 1946, Brunschvig was elected president of the SIG, an office he held until his death. In that capacity he became the leading representative of Jewish and, later, Israeli interests in Switzerland. Together with government and bank representatives, he drafted a law intended to address the issue of dormant assets left with Swiss banks after the war; this did not, however, prevent the dormant assets from become a major political issue some 50 years later.

After the founding of Israel in 1948, Brunschvig arranged what public support he could for the new state. In 1967, he and his friend Reynold Tschäppät, by then mayor of Bern, convinced Bernese commercial leaders to launch a Bratwurst campaign in support of Israel, with one franc per sausage sold going to the Jewish state.

Brunschvig died on 14 October 1973 at a Jewish rally during the Yom Kippur War. He succumbed to a heart attack while delivering an emotional speech in support of Israel.
