= Medizinische Monatsschrift für Pharmazeuten =

- Discipline: Pharmacology
- Language: German
- Edited by: Heike Oberpichler-Schwenk

Publication details
- Former name: Medizinische Monatsschrift
- History: 1947–present
- Publisher: Deutscher Apotheker Verlag
- Frequency: Monthly

Standard abbreviations
- ISO 4: Med. Monatsschrift Pharm.

Indexing
- CODEN: MMPHDB
- ISSN: 0342-9601
- OCLC no.: 4138421

Links
- Journal homepage; Online access; Online archive

The Medizinische Monatsschrift für Pharmazeuten is a monthly peer-reviewed medical journal covering pharmacology. It has been published since 1947, originally under the title Medizinische Monatsschrift: Zeitschrift für allgemeine Medizin und Therapie. Its title was changed to Medizinische Monatsschrift für Pharmazeuten in 1978.

== Abstracting and indexing ==
The journal is abstracted and indexed in Chemical Abstracts, Index Medicus/MEDLINE/PubMed, and Scopus.
