= Federación Latinoamericana de Hipnosis Clínica =

Latin American Professional Association for Clinical Hypnosis

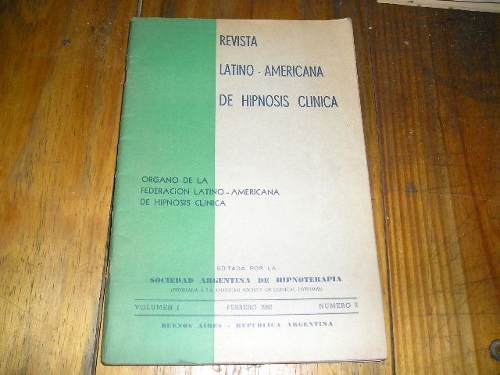
Cover of the Latin American Journal of Clinical Hypnosis, volume 1

The Federación Latinoamericana de Hipnosis Clínica (“Latin American Association for Clinical Hypnosis”) was a Latin American professional association for clinical hypnosis.

The association was founded in the 1950s following Milton H. Erickson′s hypnotherapy with the aim of networking and professional training as well as raising public awareness for the benefits of hypnosis. Amongst their founding members were Isaac Gubel′s Sociedad Argentina de Hipnoterapia. The association included, among others, two Argentinian, four Brazilian, one Chilean, two Colombian, one Spanish, one Peruvian, one Uruguayan and five Verenzolan associations for clinical hypnosis.

The association held regular meetings in various countries of the continent. Its publication organ, the Revista Latino-Americana de Hipnosis Clínica, was published under the editorial direction of Isaac Gubel in November 1959. Other publications were the Acta hipnológica latinoamericana and the Hipnología.

The organization is not to be confused with the Confederación Latinoamericana de Hipnosis Clínica y Experimental.

== See also ==
- South African Hypnosis Network
