= François Naville =

Swiss physician

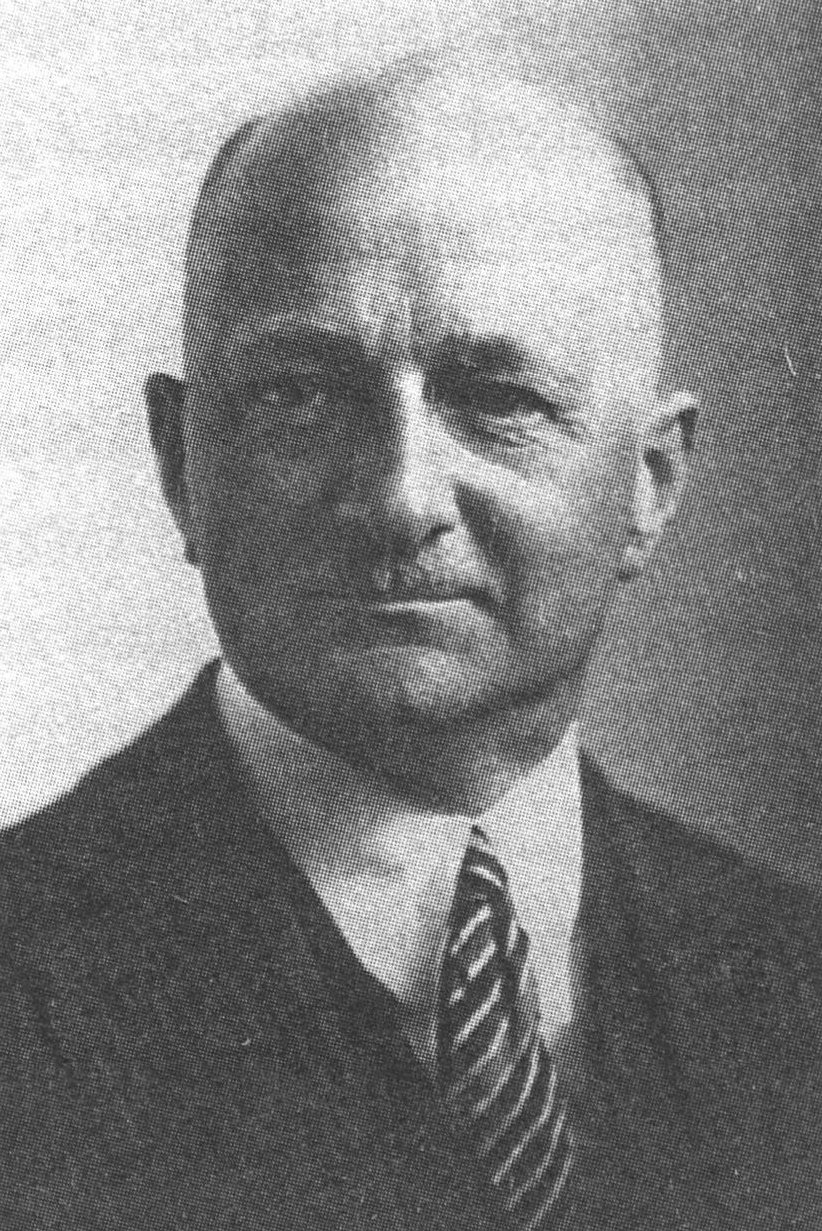
- Born: 14 June 1883; Neuchâtel, Switzerland
- Died: 3 April 1968 (aged 84); Geneva, Switzerland
- Scientific career
- Fields: Medicine
- Workplaces: University of Geneva

François Naville (14 June 1883 – 3 April 1968) was a Swiss physician and director of the medico-legal Institute of the University of Geneva. He was the only truly neutral expert participating in the international Katyn Commission investigating the Soviet Katyn massacre of some 22,000 Polish prisoners of war, mostly Polish Army officers, who had been arrested and imprisoned in the course of the Soviet and German invasion of Poland. Their bodies were discovered in a series of large mass graves in the forest near Smolensk in Russia following the Nazi German Operation Barbarossa.

== Biography ==
Naville was born on 14 June 1883 in Neuchâtel, the son of Adrien Naville, a theologian and philosopher, and Isabelle Roguin. His maternal grandfather was Jules Roguin. Naville studied medicine in Geneva and Paris, obtaining his federal diploma in 1907 and his doctorate in 1910. He initially dedicated himself to neurology and child psychiatry before turning to clinical criminology.

Naville was appointed privat-docent of neurology in 1912, associate professor of legal medicine in 1928, then full professor and director of the medico-legal institute at the University of Geneva in 1934. He was president of the Swiss Neurological Society from 1930 to 1932 and dean of the University of Geneva's faculty of medicine from 1948 to 1950. Naville died on 3 April 1968 in Geneva, aged 84.

=== Katyn affair ===
In 1943, Naville was invited to join a commission of experts convened by the German authorities to investigate the massacre of Polish officers in the Katyn forest, near Smolensk. He participated as a private citizen, though with the consent of the Swiss authorities and the ICRC. The commission's report determined that the executions took place in March and April 1940, when the Katyn forest was under Soviet control. Naville became the target of political attacks and the commission's objectivity was questioned. The criticism persisted until 1990, when the Soviet Union officially acknowledged the massacre.

"On April 13, 1943, the German radio announced that a common grave containing the corpses of Polish officers was found in the forest of Katyn, near Smolensk. Further enquiries showed that the dead bodies were those of officers imprisoned by the Russians in autumn 1939 and about who nobody had news since Springtime 1940. The CICR refused to deal with this problem without the agreement of the Soviets. So the Germans called together a committee of international experts to examine the grave in Katyn. Prof. Francis Naville, director of the medico-legal Institute of the University of Geneva, was the only expert really neutral in that commission. He had the merit to prove quite clearly that these criminal executions were ordered by Stalin. After the Second World War, Prof. Naville was criticised for having accepted to participate to the mission to Katyn by Jean Vincent, a deputy of the Swiss labour party (communist party) who claimed that the massacre of Katyn had been done by the Germans. Prof. Naville got no support from the CICR, who “did not want to know” who was responsible in order to avoid diplomatic complications with the Soviet Union. Only in 1989 the discovery of Prof. Naville was accepted and confirmed by the Soviet authorities."
