= Jaccoud case =

1960s Swiss murder trial

The Jaccoud Case, in French Affaire Jaccoud, also known as the Affaire Poupette, was a Swiss judicial scandal of the 1960s.

== Murder of Charles Zumbach ==
On 1 May 1958, Charles Zumbach, a seventy-year-old dealer in agricultural machinery, was brutally murdered at his home in Plan-les-Ouates. When his wife came home, she heard four shots and cries for help. Shortly afterwards an unknown man shoved her towards the garden and started shooting at her. Later, she could not recall the appearance of the offender. The perpetrator – perhaps there were several – then returned to the injured Charles Zumbach, and stabbed him to death with a knife before escaping on a bicycle.

Zumbach ran an agricultural machinery business in Plan-les-Ouates, which, it was later revealed, also served as the headquarters of an international gang of criminals and arms dealers led by a former member of the French Foreign Legion who called himself “Reymond”.

== The accused, Pierre Jaccoud ==
When the police interrogated Zumbach's son André, he said he had received two calls at his workplace (a radio station in Geneva) the night of the killing, but both times the caller hung up without speaking. André Zumbach suspected that the caller wanted to make sure that he was not at his parents' house. Asked by the police whom he suspected of being the caller, Zumbach named Pierre Jaccoud, a prominent Geneva lawyer and politician who had had an eight-year relationship with Linda Baud (whom Jaccoud called "Poupette" – "dolly"). Baud worked as executive secretary at the radio station, had had an affair with André Zumbach, and wanted to leave Jaccoud. Jaccoud had written her many desperate letters to convince her to stay with him. Eight months before the murder, Jaccoud sent nude photos of her to her new lover, André Zumbach. The police suspected Jaccoud of the murder.

== Contested expert testimony ==
The police searched Jaccoud's apartment in his absence; he was in Stockholm on a business trip in connection with his position as Vice President of the Geneva Chamber of Commerce. They found blood on a coat and a Moroccan knife, but, as later studies revealed, Jaccoud and the victim shared the same blood group, Type O. Erik Undritz, a renowned Basel haematologist, and Pierre Hegg, head of the Geneva Forensic Laboratory, testified that there were also liver cells on the knife. However, this testimony was later contested; the cells could have been of animal origin, and the knife had been stored for some time after the murder. Jaccoud owned two pistols, but neither was the murder weapon. In addition, on the road near Zumbach's house a button was found that matched the buttons of one of Jaccoud's coats. The coat itself was found in a box of used clothing, and was missing exactly one button. On his return in June 1958, Jaccoud was arrested. In prison he suffered a nervous breakdown and spent most of his time in the infirmary.

== The trial ==
From 18 January 1960 onwards, the trial took place before a jury in Geneva. The case attracted attention far beyond the Swiss borders. For the prosecution, Attorney General Charles Cornu reminded a reporter for Die Zeit of a "god of revenge" and "a classical mask of tragedy". Defending Jaccoud was the famous Paris barrister René Floriot. Jaccoud was in a hospital chair. There were many mix-ups; for example, Zumbach's wife did not pick Jaccoud out of a line-up but instead identified a policeman. Linda Baud stated that at the time of the act, she was no longer in a relationship with André Zumbach, but instead with another man. Nevertheless, Jaccoud was found guilty of 'simple manslaughter' and sentenced to seven years in prison minus time served. The jury deliberated for three hours.

== Controversy over the verdict ==
The verdict in the Jaccoud case is one of the most controversial in Swiss jurisprudence.

At the time, for the Paris press, the case typified Swiss compromise. They regarded Jaccoud as a victim of Genevan Calvinist morality. Floriot said in Paris, "If my client was guilty, he should have received a much heavier sentence; if not, he should have been liberated". He called the case "a second Dreyfus Affair" and blamed the verdict on excessive respect for authority, in this case the prosecution. At the time of the trial, Swiss students infuriated by the insult publicly burned Paris newspapers.

According to Hans Martin Sutermeister, a Bern doctor bent on exposing courtroom injustices, the verdict was nothing more than a miscarriage of justice, whose main cause was inadequate forensic expertise. Sutermeister described Hegg as "an autodidact without a basic education, who had already been wrong more often". Sutermeister, convinced of Jaccoud's innocence, believed that he had known that Baud was no longer dating André Zumbach and that Zumbach had been murdered because he supplied Algerian rebels with $12,000 worth of dud explosives. He pointed out that "Reymond" and his arms dealer friends, unbeknownst to Zumbach, also kept knives and bayonets in the garage, one of which could have been the murder weapon. Sutermeister spent considerable time attempting to show that Jaccoud's conviction was a result of forensic "dilettantism". Hegg had been censured for confusing human and pig's blood in a previous investigation, and had been defended on that occasion by Jaccoud – who had difficulty getting him to pay his fee. At one point Hegg sued Sutermeister for defamation. But he was not alone in disputing the verdict. Horace Mastronardi called it "the greatest judicial error of the post-war years". He and other lawyers tried to have it reversed for "more than twenty years".

Nonetheless, in 1980, the court rejected a final appeal of the case. Pierre Jaccoud died in 1994.

== Legacy ==
- On 16 June 1974, the case was dramatised in the East German TV series Fernsehpitaval under the direction of Wolfgang Luderer with the title Die Aktfotos ("The Nude Photographs").
- In the free-to-play mobile hidden object game Murder in the Alps by Nordcurrent, a murder that occurs in the 4th chapter "Forgotten Memento" of Part 3 is inspired by this murder case, with many of the people and circumstances being identical. This inspiration is confirmed by the developers in a Q&A on the game's social media accounts.

== Sources ==
- Jürgen Thorwald, Blutiges Geheimnis, Munich: Droemer Knaur, 1969, OCLC 159809005 (German)
- Stéphane Jourat, L'Affaire Jaccoud, Paris: Fleuve Noir, 1992, ISBN 2-265-04662-0 (French)
- Jean Duché, Pourquoi Jaccoud a-t-il tué? Paris: Flammarion, 1960, OCLC 420009404 (French)
