= Otto Scrinzi =

Austrian politician (1918–2012)

Otto Scrinzi (5 February 1918 in Lienz, Tirol – 2 January 2012 in Moosburg, Austria) was an Austrian neurologist, journalist and politician (VdU/FPÖ).

During the Austrian Anschluss with Nazi Germany and World War II, Scrinzi was a member of the Hitler Youth, the Nazi Party and an SA Sturmführer. Later, he became the leading representative of the German nationalist wing of the so-called "third camp" (Drittes Lager), namely the Federation of Independents (VdU) and later the Freedom Party of Austria (FPÖ). While he described himself as "national-conservative", "right-wing" and "conservative", others outside the FPÖ described him as a far-right politician.

He got the Decoration of Honour for Services to the Republic of Austria.
