= Max Alsberg =

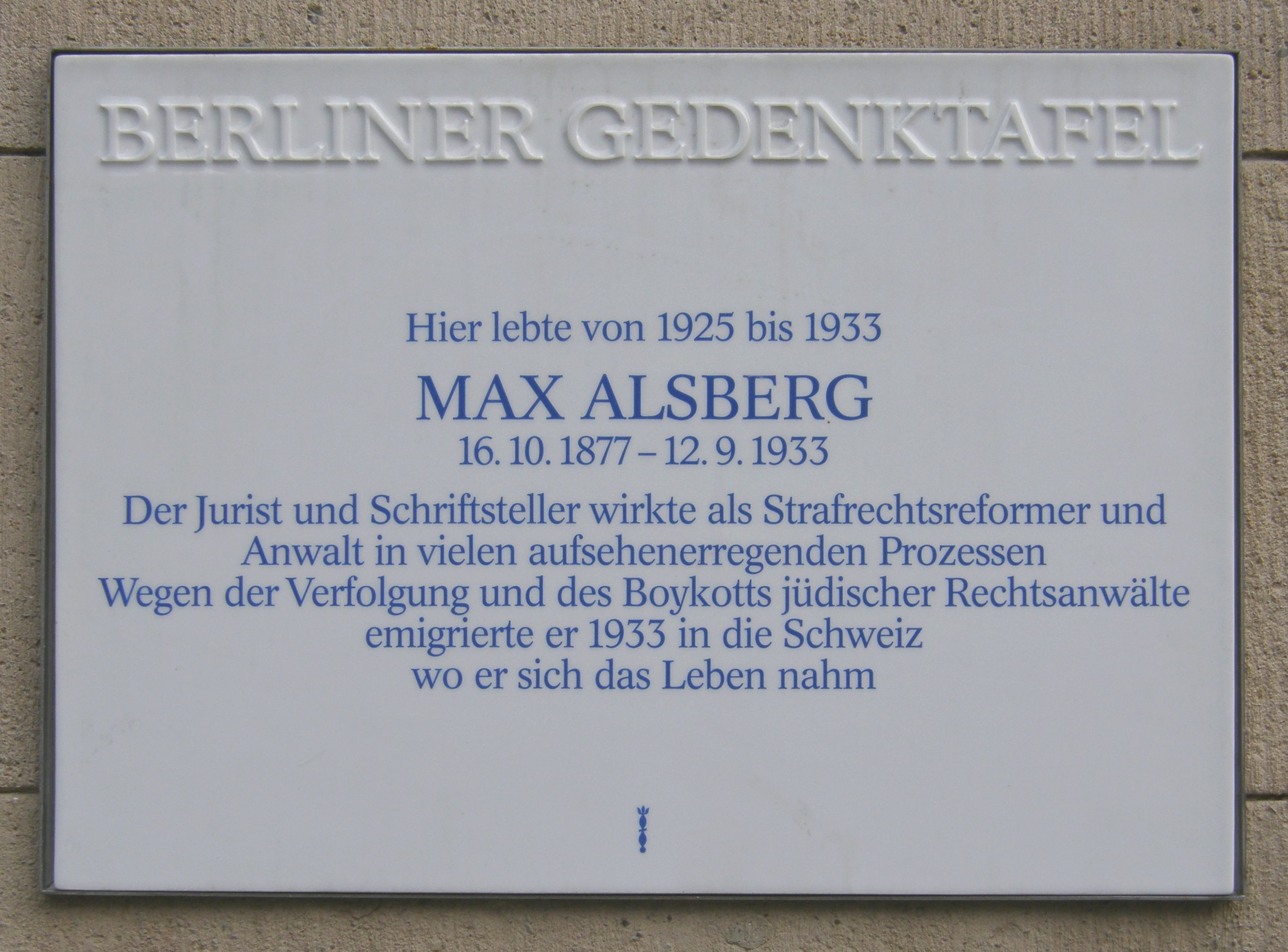
- Memorial plaque in Berlin
- Born: 16 October 1877; Bonn, Prussia, Germany
- Died: 11 September 1933 (aged 55); Samedan, Switzerland
- Occupation: Lawyer

Max Alsberg (16 October 1877 – 11 September 1933) was a famous criminal lawyer of the Weimar Republic.

Alsberg worked primarily as a criminal defense lawyer; he defended Karl Helfferich in 1920 and Carl von Ossietzky in 1931. He also wrote plays (Voruntersuchung in 1927, and Konflikt). His best known contribution to legal science is the handbook Der Beweisantrag im Strafprozess.

Max Alsberg committed suicide by gunshot on 11 September 1933.
