= Max Hirschberg =

German lawyer and legal scholar (1883–1964)

Max Hirschberg (November 13, 1883 – June 21, 1964) was a German Jewish Weimar era anti-Nazi criminal defense lawyer and scholar.

Hirschberg confronted in court directly Adolf Hitler; he was imprisoned, but released because of his conduct during World War I and allowed to practice law even after the 1933 election.

In 1934, he emigrated from Germany to Italy, and later to New York City.

Hirschberg wrote mainly about miscarriages of justice.

He was also a friend of Philipp Löwenfeld.

In recognition of Hirschberg's work on behalf of innocent persons wrongly convicted of crimes, in 2007 he was named as one of the inaugural members of the Wrongful Conviction Hall of Honor established by Justice Denied. The article about Hirschberg was titled "Max Hirschberg: One Of The World's Great Wrongful Conviction Lawyers."

== Bibliography ==
=== by himself ===
- (1998) Jude und Demokrat: Erinnerungen eines Münchener Rechtsanwalts, 1883 bis 1939 (Biographische Quellen zur Zeitgeschichte) (Publisher:) R. Oldenbourg. ISBN 978-3-486-56367-2
- (1941) "Pathology of Criminal Justice. Innocent Convicted in Three Murder Cases". Journal of Criminal Law and Criminology (1931-1951), Vol.31, No.5 (Jan. - Feb., 1941), pp. 536–550.
- (1940-1941) "Wrongful Convictions". 13 Rocky Mountain Law Review, 1940-1941, pp. 20–46.
- (1940) "Convicting the Innocent". 13 Rocky Mountain Law Review 20, December 1940. ("Cites 26 cases of wrongful conviction, 2 in the United States and 24 in Europe, primarily in Germany." (very short review by Hans Sherrer, 2000))

=== by others ===
- Douglas G. Morris. Justice Imperiled: The Anti-Nazi Lawyer Max Hirschberg in Weimar Germany (Social History, Popular Culture, and Politics in Germany). University of Michigan Press, 2005. ISBN 978-0-472-11476-4 (book review by Timothy McAllister)
- "Max Hirschberg: One Of The World's Great Wrongful Conviction Lawyers," Justice Denied, Issue 35, Winter 2007, pp. 27–28, 33.
