= Klaus Volk =

- Born: 29 April 1944 (age 82); Coburg
- Occupation: jurist

Klaus Volk (born 29 April 1944) is a German jurist, professor at LMU Munich and defense lawyer specialized in commercial-law-related criminal cases.

His doctorate thesis at LMU Munich 1970 was about philosophy of law.

Among his clients were Josef Ackermann (see Mannesmann Trial), Joachim Zahn and Boris Becker.

Volk was critical towards the "security measures" of Wolfgang Schäuble against terrorists.
