= Pierre Jaccoud =

Swiss lawyer and convicted murderer

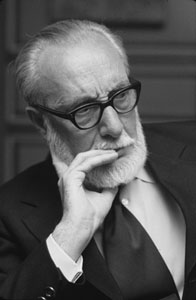

Pierre Jaccoud (November 24, 1905 – July 4, 1996) was a Swiss lawyer and Radical Party politician in Geneva. He was convicted of the murder of Charles Zumbach in a trial that remains controversial to this day.

Jaccoud had "been Aly Khan's attorney during his divorce from Rita Hayworth, and he represented innumerable Swiss and foreign companies in Geneva's tightly controlled banking community."

Jaccoud was accused of having murdered Charles Zumbach on 1 May 1958, in Plan-les-Ouates, near Geneva. After a business trip to Sweden and on "his return to Geneva in June 1958, Jaccoud was arrested." Jaccoud's court case is also known as L'Affaire Poupette.

After a trial, he was convicted of the murder and sentenced to seven years in prison.

== Thrilling Cities ==
- Ian Fleming wrote about the case in detail in the Geneva Chapter of Thrilling Cities.

== Bibliography ==
- Stéphane Jourat, L Affaire Jaccoud, Editor: Fleuve Noir, 1992.
