= Karl Peters (jurist) =

- Born: 23 January 1904; Koblenz
- Died: 2 July 1998 (aged 94); Münster
- Occupation: jurist
- Known for: works on miscarriage of justice

Karl Albert Joseph Peters (23 January 1904 – 2 July 1998) was a German expert in criminal law, criminal pedagogy and miscarriages of justice. He studied legal science in Königsberg, Leipzig and Münster.

Peters was awarded the Federal Cross of Merit and the Order of St. Sylvester.

== Publications ==
- Peters, K. Strafprozess: ein Lehrbuch. Heidelberg: Müller, 1985. ISBN 3-8114-1185-3
- Peters, K. Justiz als Schicksal: ein Plädoyer für ‚die andere Seite‘. Berlin: De Gruyter, 1979. ISBN 3-11-008084-2
- Klaus Wasserburg (org.) et al.: Wahrheit und Gerechtigkeit im Strafverfahren: Festgabe für Karl Peters aus Anlass seines 80. Geburtstages, Heidelberg: Müller, 1984. ISBN 3-8114-3084-X
- Jürgen Baumann, Klaus Tiedemann (editors). Einheit und Vielfalt des Strafrechts: Festschrift für Karl Peters zum 70. Geburtstag. Tübingen: Mohr, 1974. ISBN 3-16-635542-1
