= Bernhard Walthard =

- Born: 29 May 1897
- Died: 12 May 1992 (aged 94)
- Citizenship: Switzerland
- Education: University of Zurich
- Known for: director of the Pathological Institute of Berne
- Scientific career
- Fields: Pathology
- Workplaces: University of Berne

Bernhard Walthard (29 May 1897 – 12 May 1992) was a Swiss pathologist and Dean of the Faculty of Medicine of the University of Bern.

In 1922 he earned his doctorate at the University of Zurich with a thesis on liver function tests during pregnancy sub partu, in childbirth and in eclampsia. In 1932, he became lecturer at the University of Bern, in 1940 associate professor, and in 1946 full professor. He was also director of the Institute of Pathology of the same university.

== Publications ==
- Walthard, Bernhard (1981). Die Geschichte des Burgerspitals von Bern in der Zeitspanne von 1942-1974. Bern: 1981
- Walthard, Bernhard (1969). Die Schilddrüse. Westberlin: Springer, 1969
- Walthard, Bernhard (1928). "LXXVIII. Zur Pathogenese des dysidrotischen Sympiomenkomplexes. Über ein unter dem Bilde einer Dysidrosis verlaufendes Epidermophytid". Dermatologische Zeitschrift 1928, Nr.53, p. 692-706 doi:10.1159/000252352
