= Cause célèbre =

Issue or incident that incites widespread controversy and public debate

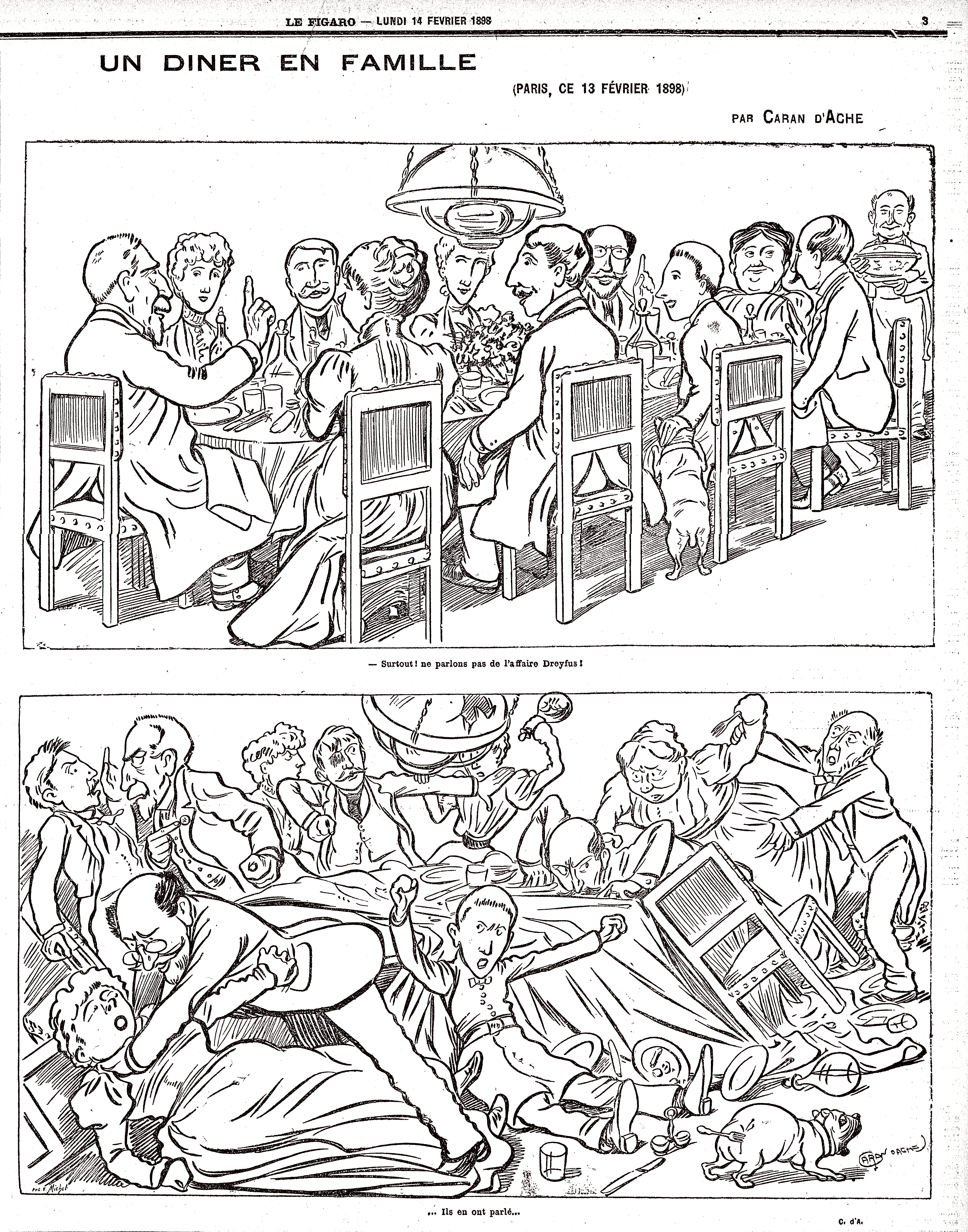
Contemporary cartoon depicting the divisions in French society caused by the Dreyfus affair

A cause célèbre (unadapted borrowing from French; lit. transl. famous cause; /ˌkɔːz səˈlɛb(rə)/ KAWZ sə-LEB(-rə), French: [koz selɛbʁ]; pl. causes célèbres, pronounced like the singular) is an issue or incident arousing widespread controversy, outside campaigning, and heated public debate. The term is sometimes used positively for celebrated legal cases for their precedent value (each locus classicus or "case-in-point") and more often negatively for infamous ones, whether for scale, outrage, scandal, or conspiracy theories. The phrase "cause célèbre" is no longer used as such in modern French; instead it has been fully adopted into English and is unitalicized in most English dictionaries.

It has been noted that the public attention given to a particular case or event can obscure the facts rather than clarify them. As John Humffreys Parry states, "The true story of many a cause célèbre is never made manifest in the evidence given or in the advocates' orations, but might be recovered from these old papers when the dust of ages has rendered them immune from scandal".

== Etymology ==
The term cause célèbre derives from the title of the collection of reports of well-known French court decisions from the 17th and 18th centuries. The first series, consisting of 22 volumes, was compiled by François Gayot de Pitaval and the second series of 15 volumes (known as Nouvelles Cause Célèbres) by Nicolas-Toussaint Des Essarts. It was published in 37 volumes in 1763. Literally, cause célèbre means "celebrated case" or "famous case" in French. It came into much more common usage after the wrongful 1894 conviction of Jewish French army officer Alfred Dreyfus for espionage. The conviction caused widespread controversy and scandal over antisemitism in France, deeply divided French society, and led to international attention to the situation. According to John F. Neville:

The Dreyfus case had proved to the satisfaction of a cynical post-war world that people could be the victims of government conspiracy and prejudice. It is commonplace for citizens anywhere in the world to conspire against their governments, but when a government office, agency, department, or bureau is accused of "framing" someone, it invariably sticks in the public consciousness for generations.

Initially, cause célèbre specifically referred to a legal case which attracted public notoriety, but its meaning was subsequently extended to include any famous or notorious person, thing, or event. It is also wrongly used in the sense of any famous cause or ideal.

== Notable cases ==
=== 19th century ===
- The Mortara case, Papal States, 1850s and 1860s
- The Vera Zasulich trial, Russian Empire, 1878
- The Dreyfus affair, France, 1890s and 1900s
- The murder trial of Maria Barbella, United States, 1895

=== 20th century ===
==== Asia ====
- The Bhawal case, British India, 1946

==== Europe ====
- The Beilis case, Russian Empire, 1913
- The Đorđe Martinović incident, Yugoslavia, 1985

==== United States ====
- Ted Bundy's impending trial in Colorado, 1977
- The Rodney King beating, 1991
- O. J. Simpson murder case, 1994–1995

=== 21st century ===
- The Amanda Knox trials, Italy, 2009–2015
- Sergei Magnitsky's death, Russia, 2009
- Mohamed Bouazizi's self-immolation, Tunisia, 2010
- The Julian Assange extradition, United Kingdom, 2011
- The Pussy Riot trial, Russia, 2012
- The Delhi gang rape, India, 2012
- The trial of Kyle Rittenhouse after the Kenosha unrest shooting, United States, 2021
- Lindsay Clancy's killing of her children, United States, 2026

== Fictional examples ==
- The death of General Lamarque in Les Misérables (1832)
- The prison riot in Natural Born Killers (1994)

== See also ==
- Trial of the century
- Lists of landmark court decisions
- List of French expressions in English
- Media circus
- Missing white woman syndrome
